= Loom World Tour =

2024–2025 concert tour by Imagine Dragons

- Tour by Imagine Dragons
- Promotional poster
- Location: Asia; Europe; North America; South America
- Associated albums: Loom
- Start date: July 30, 2024
- End date: June 21, 2026
- No. of shows: 96
- Supporting acts: Myles Smith; Jacob Banks; Cannons; EaJ; Peter McPoland; Declan McKenna
- Attendance: 2.2 million (Note: Based on the shows from July 2024 to July 2025.)
- Box office: $239 million
- Website: imaginedragonsmusic.com/tour

Imagine Dragons concert chronology
- Mercury World Tour (2022–2023); Loom World Tour (2024–2026)

The Loom World Tour was the fifth concert tour by American pop rock band Imagine Dragons. It was in support of their sixth studio album Loom (2024). The tour began on July 30, 2024, in Camden, New Jersey and concluded on June 21, 2026 in Monterrey, Mexico. The show that took place in Los Angeles, on October 27, 2024, was recorded as a concert film, Imagine Dragons: Live from the Hollywood Bowl (with the LA Film Orchestra). It was released in theaters worldwide for limited release on March 26 and 29, 2025.

== Background ==
On April 22, 2024, the Loom World Tour was officially announced by the band, following the Loom album title and release date announcement. The next day, a post on the band's official social media announced the first dates set for the tour, starting on July 30, 2024, in Camden, New Jersey.

On April 24, it was announced that due to overwhelming demand, three new dates were added to the North America tour, in Salt Lake City, Toronto and Los Angeles.

== Commercial performance ==
According to Billboard, the tour has grossed over $239 million from 2.2 million tickets sold between July 2024 and July 2025.

== Set list ==
This set list was taken from the show in Camden on July 30, 2024. It does not represent all shows throughout the tour.

1. "Fire in These Hills"
2. "Thunder"
3. "Bones"
4. "Take Me to the Beach"
5. "Whatever It Takes"
6. "Next to Me"
7. "It's Time"
8. "Bad Liar"
9. "Nice to Meet You"
10. "Wake Up"
11. "Radioactive"
12. "Demons"
13. "Natural"
14. "Kid"
15. "Gods Don't Pray"
16. "Sharks"
17. "Enemy"
18. "Eyes Closed"
19. "In Your Corner"
20. "Don't Forget Me"
21. "Believer"

== Tour dates ==
List of 2024 concerts, showing date, city, country, venue, opening act, attendance and gross revenue
Date	City	Country	Venue	Opening act(s)	Attendance	Revenue
July 30	Camden	United States	Freedom Mortgage Pavilion	Myles Smith	—	—
August 2	Wantagh	United States	Northwell Health at Jones Beach Theater	Myles Smith	—	—
August 4	Holmdel	United States	PNC Bank Arts Center	Myles Smith	—	—
August 6	Mansfield	United States	Xfinity Center	Myles Smith	—	—
August 8	Toronto	Canada	Budweiser Stage	Jacob Banks	—	—
August 9	Toronto	Canada	Budweiser Stage	Jacob Banks	—	—
August 12	Clarkston	United States	Pine Knob Music Theatre	Jacob Banks	—	—
August 14	Burgettstown	United States	The Pavilion at Star Lake	Jacob Banks	—	—
August 16	Maryland Heights	United States	Hollywood Casino Amphitheatre	Jacob Banks	—	—
August 18	Tinley Park	United States	Credit Union 1 Amphitheatre	Jacob Banks	—	—
August 20	Noblesville	United States	Ruoff Music Center	Cannons	—	—
August 22	Bristow	United States	Jiffy Lube Live	Cannons	—	—
August 23	Columbia	United States	Merriweather Post Pavilion	Cannons	—	—
August 26	Virginia Beach	United States	Veterans United Home Loans Amphitheater at Virginia Beach	Cannons	—	—
August 28	Charlotte	United States	PNC Music Pavilion	Cannons	—	—
August 30	West Palm Beach	United States	ITHINK Financial Amphitheatre	Cannons	—	—
September 1	Tampa	United States	MidFlorida Credit Union Amphitheatre	Cannons	—	—
September 4	Dallas	United States	Dos Equis Pavilion	Cannons	—	—
September 6	The Woodlands	United States	Cynthia Woods Mitchell Pavilion	Cannons	—	—
September 8	Ridgedale	United States	Thunder Ridge Nature Arena	Cannons	—	—
September 14 (Note: The September 14, 2024, concert was a part of Rock in Rio.)	Rio de Janeiro	Brazil	Barra Olympic Park	—N/a	—N/a	—N/a
September 28	George	United States	The Gorge Amphitheatre	EaJ	—	—
September 29	Ridgefield	United States	RV Inn Style Resorts Amphitheater	EaJ	—	—
October 2	Wheatland	United States	Toyota Amphitheatre	EaJ	—	—
October 5	Chula Vista	United States	North Island Credit Union Amphitheatre	EaJ	—	—
October 6	Phoenix	United States	Talking Stick Resort Amphitheatre	EaJ	—	—
October 9	Albuquerque	United States	Isleta Amphitheater	EaJ	—	—
October 11	West Valley City	United States	Utah First Credit Union Amphitheatre	EaJ	—	—
October 12	West Valley City	United States	Utah First Credit Union Amphitheatre	Peter McPoland	—	—
October 15	West Valley City	United States	Utah First Credit Union Amphitheatre	Peter McPoland	—	—
October 17	Morrison	United States	Red Rocks Amphitheatre	Peter McPoland	—	—
October 20	Mountain View	United States	Shoreline Amphitheatre	Peter McPoland	—	—
October 22	Los Angeles	United States	Hollywood Bowl	Peter McPoland	—	—
October 23	Los Angeles	United States	Hollywood Bowl	EaJ	—	—
October 26	Los Angeles	United States	Hollywood Bowl	Cannons	—	—
October 27 (Note: The October 27, 2024, concert was accompanied by the LA Film Orchestra. The show was released in cinemas on March 26 & 29, 2025. It was also streamed for one night only on November 18, 2025.)	Los Angeles	United States	Hollywood Bowl	EaJ	—	—
November 21	Kuala Lumpur	Malaysia	Malaysia National Hockey Stadium	—N/a	—	—
November 23	Bangkok	Thailand	Queen Sirikit National Convention Center	—N/a	—	—
November 25	Singapore		Singapore Indoor Stadium	—N/a	—	—
November 28	Taipei	Taiwan	Taipei Nangang Exhibition Center	—N/a	—	—
November 30	Hong Kong		AsiaWorld-Arena	—N/a	—	—
December 1	Hong Kong		AsiaWorld-Arena	—N/a	—	—
December 3	Tokyo	Japan	Ariake Arena	—N/a	—	—
December 8 (Note: The December 8, 2024, concert was a part of 8Wonder Winter Festival.)	Ho Chi Minh City	Vietnam	Vinhomes Grand Park	—N/a	—N/a	—N/a

List of 2025 concerts, showing date, city, country, venue, opening act, attendance and gross revenue
Date	City	Country	Venue	Opening act(s)	Attendance	Revenue
April 4	Hangzhou	China	Hangzhou Olympic Sports Center Stadium	—N/a	—	—
April 6	Hangzhou	China	Hangzhou Olympic Sports Center Stadium	—N/a	—	—
April 8	Shenzhen	China	Shenzhen Universiade Sports Centre Stadium	—N/a	—	—
April 10	Shenzhen	China	Shenzhen Universiade Sports Centre Stadium	—N/a	—	—
May 27	Milan	Italy	Ippodromo Snai La Mura	Declan McKenna	—	—
May 29	Zurich	Switzerland	Stadion Letzigrund	Declan McKenna	—	—
May 31	Zurich	Switzerland	Stadion Letzigrund	Declan McKenna	—	—
June 3	Tallinn	Estonia	Tallinn Song Festival Grounds	Declan McKenna	—	—
June 5	Stockholm	Sweden	3Arena	Declan McKenna	—	—
June 7	Trondheim	Norway	Neon Festival at Dahls Arena	Declan McKenna	—	—
June 9	Prague	Czech Republic	Letňany Airport	Declan McKenna	120,000	—
June 11	Prague	Czech Republic	Letňany Airport	Declan McKenna	120,000	—
June 14	Budapest	Hungary	Puskás Aréna	Declan McKenna	—	—
June 15	Budapest	Hungary	Puskás Aréna	Declan McKenna	—	—
June 18	Padua	Italy	Stadio Euganeo	Declan McKenna	—	—
June 19	Padua	Italy	Stadio Euganeo	Declan McKenna	—	—
June 21	Naples	Italy	Stadio Diego Armando Maradona	Declan McKenna	—	—
June 26	Lisbon	Portugal	Estádio da Luz	Declan McKenna	—	—
June 28	Madrid	Spain	Estadio Metropolitano	Declan McKenna	—	—
July 1	Barcelona	Spain	Estadi Olímpic Lluís Companys	Declan McKenna	—	—
July 3	Lyon	France	Groupama Stadium	Declan McKenna	—	—
July 5	Paris	France	Stade de France	Declan McKenna	—	—
July 6	Paris	France	Stade de France	Declan McKenna	—	—
July 9	Amsterdam	Netherlands	Johan Cruyff Arena	Declan McKenna	—	—
July 12	Werchter	Belgium	Werchter Boutique	Declan McKenna	—	—
July 14	Copenhagen	Denmark	Refshaleøen	Declan McKenna	—	—
July 16	Hamburg	Germany	Volksparkstadion	Declan McKenna	—	—
July 18	Warsaw	Poland	PGE Narodowy	Declan McKenna	—	—
July 19	Warsaw	Poland	PGE Narodowy	Declan McKenna	—	—
July 21	Frankfurt	Germany	Deutsche Bank Park	Declan McKenna	—	—
July 23	Lille	France	Stade Pierre-Mauroy	Declan McKenna	—	—
July 25	London	England	Tottenham Hotspur Stadium	Declan McKenna	—	—
July 26	London	England	Tottenham Hotspur Stadium	Declan McKenna	—	—
August 23 (Note: The August 23, 2025, concert was a part of the LIV Golf Event Summer Concert series.)	Plymouth	United States	The Cardinal at Saint John's Resort	—N/a	—	—
August 29 (Note: The August 29, 2025, concert was a part of the JAS Labor Day Experience.)	Snowmass	United States	Snowmass Town Park	—N/a	—	—
September 5	Mexico City	Mexico	Estadio GNP Seguros	Jacinto	—	—
September 7	Mexico City	Mexico	Estadio GNP Seguros	Jacinto	—	—
October 17	Bogota	Colombia	Vive Claro	—N/a	—	—
October 19	Lima	Peru	Estadio San Marcos	—N/a	—	—
October 21	Santiago	Chile	Estadio Monumental	Mecánico	—	—
October 23	Buenos Aires	Argentina	Hipódromo de San Isidro	—N/a	—	—
October 26	Belo Horizonte	Brazil	Estadio Mineirao	—N/a	—	—
October 29	Brasilia	Brazil	Estadio Mane Garrincha	—N/a	—	—
October 30	São Paulo	Brazil	Estádio MorumBIS	—N/a	—	—
October 31	São Paulo	Brazil	Estádio MorumBIS	—N/a	—	—
November 1	São Paulo	Brazil	Estádio MorumBIS	—N/a	—	—

List of 2026 concerts, showing date, city, country, venue, opening act, attendance and gross revenue
Date	City	Country	Venue	Opening act(s)	Attendance	Revenue
March 13	Shanghai	China	Shanghai Stadium	—N/a	—	—
March 15	Shanghai	China	Shanghai Stadium	—N/a	—	—
March 17	Shanghai	China	Shanghai Stadium	—N/a	—	—
March 20	Guangzhou	China	Guangdong Olympic Stadium	—N/a	—	—
March 22	Guangzhou	China	Guangdong Olympic Stadium	—N/a	—	—
March 25	Guangzhou	China	Guangdong Olympic Stadium	—N/a	—	—
March 27	Chengdu	China	Dong'an Lake Stadium	—N/a	—	—
March 29	Chengdu	China	Dong'an Lake Stadium	—N/a	—	—
May 21	Toronto	Canada	RBC Amphitheatre	—N/a	—	—
June 17	Las Vegas	United States	Allegiant Stadium	—N/a	—	—
June 21	Monterrey	Mexico	Fundidora Park	—N/a	—	—

=== Cancelled dates ===
List of cancelled concerts, showing date, city, country, venue and reason for cancellation
Date	City	Country	Venue	Reason
April 12, 2025	Shanghai	China	Shanghai International Circuit	Extreme winds
April 13, 2025	Shanghai	China	Shanghai International Circuit	Extreme winds
