= Roots (song) =

Single by Imagine Dragons

from the album Evolve (Japanese edition)
- Released: August 27, 2015
- Recorded: 2015
- Length: 2:54
- Label: KIDinaKORNER; Interscope
- Songwriters: Ben McKee; Daniel Platzman; Dan Reynolds; Wayne Sermon; Alex da Kid
- Producer: Alex da Kid

Imagine Dragons singles chronology
"Shots" (2015)	"Roots" (2015)	"I Was Me" (2015)

Music video
- "Roots" on YouTube

"Roots" is a song by American pop rock band Imagine Dragons. It was written by band members Ben McKee, Daniel Platzman, Dan Reynolds and Wayne Sermon along with producer Alex da Kid, and originally released as a non-album single, however it appears as a bonus track on the Japanese edition of their third studio album Evolve. They performed the song for the first time on September 2, 2015, at their Melbourne, Australia, show for the Smoke + Mirrors Tour. The music video was released on September 29, 2015, and was filmed in New Zealand. The song debuted atop the Billboard Rock Digital Songs chart.

== Composition ==
Guitarist Wayne Sermon stated that the song was written on the road during their Smoke + Mirrors Tour, and that it talks about the highs and lows of their lives as musicians. The short track features a distorted drum beat over a prominent piano riff. The track is dedicated to the support they have received from their fanbase.

== Music video ==
The music video for "Roots" was released on September 29, 2015. It was filmed in New Zealand, and directed by Matt Eastin, who previously directed the video for "On Top of the World" and the Broiler remix of "Shots".

The video follows lead singer Dan Reynolds as he finds a way to escape, and remember who he is, during his hectic tour lifestyle. Throughout the video, home videos of a young Reynolds are shown ranging from infant to young adult.

== Promotion ==
On August 19, 2015, Imagine Dragons began teasing the single when they changed their social profiles to all black, with the caption "My Roots". The social media post foreshadowed and promoted the impending release of "Roots". The next day, the band began posting pictures of themselves as children on social media with a hashtag (#MYROOTS). Twitter and Instagram users began submitting pictures of themselves when they were younger with the same hashtag. All pictures were used to form a collage. The single was released to iTunes on August 27, 2015.

The single's artwork is by Louis Lander Deacon, who did the artwork for the band's 2012 EP, Continued Silence.

== Charts ==
=== Weekly charts ===
Weekly chart performance for "Roots"
Chart (2015–2016)	Peak position
US Billboard Hot 100	77
US Hot Rock & Alternative Songs (Billboard)	5
US Rock & Alternative Airplay (Billboard)	14

=== Year-end charts ===
2015 year-end chart performance for "Roots"
Chart (2015)	Position
US Hot Rock Songs (Billboard)	57

2016 year-end chart performance for "Roots"
Chart (2016)	Position
US Hot Rock Songs (Billboard)	94
US Rock Airplay (Billboard)	49

== Certifications ==
Certifications for "Roots"
Region	Certification	Certified units/sales
Brazil (Pro-Música Brasil)	Platinum	60,000^{‡}
United States (RIAA)	Gold	500,000^{‡}
^{‡} Sales+streaming figures based on certification alone.
