= Nice to Meet You (Imagine Dragons song) =

2024 song by Imagine Dragons

"Nice To Meet You"

Single by Imagine Dragons

from the album Loom
- Released: May 24, 2024
- Genre: Disco-pop; house-pop
- Length: 3:10
- Label: Interscope; Kidinakorner
- Songwriters: Dan Reynolds; Wayne Sermon; Ben McKee; Mattias Larsson; Robin Fredriksson
- Producers: Larsson; Fredriksson

Imagine Dragons singles chronology
"Eyes Closed" (2024)	"Nice To Meet You" (2024)	"Wake Up" (2024)

Music video
- "Nice To Meet You" on YouTube

"Nice To Meet You" is a song by American rock band Imagine Dragons released as the second single from the band's sixth studio album Loom. It was released through Interscope Records and Kidinakorner on May 24, 2024.

== Background and composition ==
"Nice To Meet You" was written by Imagine Dragons members Dan Reynolds, Wayne Sermon, and Ben McKee, along with Mattias Larsson and Robin Fredriksson. It was produced by Larsson and Fredriksson and mixed by Serban Ghenea and Bryce Bordone. A snippet of the song, along with snippets of "Fire in These Hills" and "Wake Up", were shared to the winning Croyants team on the band's four doors website. The band posted an official teaser of the song on May 15. In an Instagram Live, Reynolds described the lyrics of the song:

The song is about the dating process. I’ve always really hated that when you are dating someone, you are also kind of dating their friends. Like I didn’t sign up for that. I really like you but I really don’t have to like all your friends. The person that I wrote it about, I got her permission before getting the song out. We are friends now, but there was a moment when we were not doing good.

— Dan Reynolds

== Music video ==
The official music video for "Nice To Meet You" premiered on May 24, 2024, and was directed by Matt Eastin. The video features Dan Reynolds meeting a woman at a bar dancing to the song played by bandmates Wayne Sermon and Ben McKee. Eventually, the other members of the bar join in as it transforms into a 70's dance floor. After the song ends, the former two leave the bar in Reynolds' top-down car.

== Charts ==
=== Weekly charts ===
Weekly chart performance for "Nice to Meet You"
Chart (2024)	Peak position
Czech Republic Airplay (ČNS IFPI)	58
Estonia Airplay (TopHit)	68
France (SNEP)	170
Japan Hot Overseas (Billboard Japan)	12
Latvia Airplay (TopHit)	135
Lithuania Airplay (TopHit)	15
New Zealand Hot Singles (RMNZ)	14
San Marino (SMRRTV Top 50)	27
Serbia Airplay (Radiomonitor)	8
Switzerland (Schweizer Hitparade)	98
US Hot Rock & Alternative Songs (Billboard)	33

=== Monthly charts ===
Monthly chart performance for "Nice to Meet You"
Chart (2024)	Position
Czech Republic (Rádio Top 100)	87
Estonia Airplay (TopHit)	71
