= Children of the Sky (song) =

2023 song by Imagine Dragons

Single by Imagine Dragons
- Released: August 30, 2023
- Length: 3:28
- Label: Interscope; Kidinakorner
- Songwriters: Dan Reynolds; Wayne Sermon; Ben McKee; Mattias Larsson; Robin Fredriksson; Inon Zur
- Producers: Larsson; Fredriksson

Imagine Dragons singles chronology
"Crushed" (2023)	"Children of the Sky" (2023)	"Eyes Closed" (2024)

Music video
- "Children of the Sky" on YouTube

"Children of the Sky" (a Starfield song), or simply "Children of the Sky", is a song by American rock band Imagine Dragons released as the soundtrack song for the Bethesda video game Starfield. It was released through Interscope Records and Kidinakorner on August 30, 2023. It is the fourth song by the band based on a video game following "Warriors" for the 2014 League of Legends World Championship, "Monster" for Infinity Blade III, and "Enemy" featuring JID for Arcane. The song is featured on the Japanese edition of the band's sixth studio album Loom (2024).

The song was used in the first musical broadcast to the Moon and back to Earth as part of the Intuitive Machines IM-2 moon lander mission.

== Background and composition ==
"Children of the Sky" was written by Dan Reynolds, Wayne Sermon, Ben McKee, Mattias Larsson, Robin Fredriksson, and Inon Zur. It was produced Larson and Fredriksson, co-produced by Bethesda Softworks, and mixed by Serban Ghenea. It is the first song released by the band to not feature Daniel Platzman since the band's EP It's Time in March 2011. Platzman would announce his permanent departure from the band in August 2024, after initially announcing a hiatus from touring the previous year. The song was first promoted on August 29, 2023 when the band posted the cover art of the song and "tomorrow" as a caption on social media. A countdown clock was also added to their official website set for 10 am EST. In a press release, Reynolds described the background of the song:

Bethesda created iconic games we’ve been playing for most of our lives, and we’re honored to have collaborated on this song for Starfield. The song, like the game, asks some of the most difficult questions we face as humans trying to find our place in the universe.”

— Dan Reynolds

== Music video ==
The music video for "Children of the Sky" premiered on September 19, 2023 and was directed by FILFURY, with VFX done by Mister and color graded by Company 3. The video features a young boy dreaming about leaving Earth and embarking on a spaceship journey as an adult. He goes through hyperspace throughout the galaxy, eventually landing in a new and undiscovered planet while memories flash through his mind. The last shot is the boy opening his eyes, showing it was, indeed, a dream. The video's plot similarly reflects the gameplay of Starfield.

== Personnel ==
Credits for "Children of the Sky" adapted from Apple Music.

Musicians

- Dan Reynolds – lead vocals
- Wayne Sermon – guitar, backing vocals
- Ben McKee – bass, backing vocals
- Mattman & Robin – keyboards, programming, synthesizer, drums
- Paul Taylor – orchestra
- Inon Zur – orchestra

Production

- Mattman & Robin – production
- Bethesda Softworks – co-production
- Serban Ghenea – mixing

== Charts ==
Chart performance for "Children of the Sky"
Chart (2023)	Peak position
France (SNEP)	51
New Zealand Hot Singles (RMNZ)	33
US Hot Rock & Alternative Songs (Billboard)	41

== Certifications ==
Certifications for "Children of the Sky"
Region	Certification	Certified units/sales
France (SNEP)	Gold	100,000^{‡}
^{‡} Sales+streaming figures based on certification alone.
