= Stars Will Align =

2024 song by Kygo and Imagine Dragons

Single by Kygo and Imagine Dragons
- Released: September 27, 2024
- Length: 3:54
- Label: Sony
- Songwriters: Kyrre Gørvell-Dahll; Dan Reynolds; Wayne Sermon; Ben McKee
- Producer: Kygo

Kygo singles chronology
"Me Before You" (2024)	"Stars Will Align" (2024)	"Hold On Me" (2024)

Imagine Dragons singles chronology
"Wake Up" (2024)	"Stars Will Align" (2024)	"Take Me to the Beach" (2024)

Music video
- "Stars Will Align" on YouTube

"Stars Will Align" is a song by Norwegian DJ Kygo and American band Imagine Dragons. It released through Sony Music on September 27, 2024. It marks the second song between the two artists, with them previously collaborating on "Born to Be Yours" released in 2018.

== Background and composition ==
"Stars Will Align" was written by Kygo and Imagine Dragons band members Dan Reynolds, Wayne Sermon, Ben McKee with production from Kygo. The song was debuted live in Montreal in Kygo's 2025 concert tour. It was officially announced on September 20, 2024 with snippets and promotion following up until its release. The song's lyrics describe knowing that a relationship will get better with time.

== Music video ==
The music video for "Stars Will Align" premiered on October 11, 2024 and was directed by Rafatoon. The video features a boy meeting a girl while riding bikes on a dirt path intersection. He goes home and discovers celestial beings connecting through a telescope. When they touch, they create beams of light and energy that shoot upon a lake nearby. He rides his bike and gets on a rowboat to the lake where particles of celestial matter hangs in the air. Soon, the girl he met before appears also in a rowboat, discovering the same phenomenon.

== Track listing ==
- Digital download
1. "Stars Will Align" – 3:54
- Digital download – Zerb remix
1. "Stars Will Align" (Zerb remix) – 3:42

== Personnel ==
Credits for "Stars Will Align" adapted from Apple Music.

Musicians
- Dan Reynolds – lead vocals
- Wayne Sermon – guitar
- Ben McKee – bass guitar
Production
- Kygo – production
- Bryce Bordone – assistant engineering
- Serban Ghenea – mixing
- Randy Merrill – mastering

== Charts ==
=== Weekly charts ===
Weekly chart performance for "Stars Will Align"
Chart (2024–2025)	Peak position
Belgium (Ultratop 50 Flanders)	26
Croatia International Airplay (Top lista)	8
Czech Republic Airplay (ČNS IFPI)	4
Czech Republic Singles Digital (ČNS IFPI)	15
Estonia Airplay (TopHit)	22
Latvia Airplay (TopHit) Zerb Remix	3
Lithuania Airplay (TopHit)	15
Netherlands (Dutch Top 40)	30
Netherlands (Single Top 100)	82
New Zealand Hot Singles (RMNZ)	5
Norway (VG-lista)	24
Slovakia Airplay (ČNS IFPI)	2
Slovenia Airplay (Radiomonitor)	12
Sweden (Sverigetopplistan)	58
Switzerland (Schweizer Hitparade)	51
UK Singles (OCC)	69
US Hot Dance/Electronic Songs (Billboard)	10

=== Monthly charts ===
Monthly chart performance for "Stars Will Align"
Chart (2024–2025)	Peak position
Czech Republic (Rádio Top 100)	11
Estonia Airplay (TopHit)	27
Latvia Airplay (TopHit) Zerb Remix	11
Lithuania Airplay (TopHit)	14
Slovakia (Rádio Top 100)	18

=== Year-end charts ===
Year-end chart performance
Chart (2025)	Position
Latvia Airplay (TopHit) Zerb Remix	113
