= Mattman & Robin =

Swedish songwriting and production duo

Mattias Per Larsson and Robin Lennart Fredriksson (known collectively as Mattman & Robin) are Swedish songwriters and record producers. They are published by Wolf Cousins, a publishing company administered by Warner Chappell Music.

In 2016, they won a Grammy Award for Album of the Year for their co-production on American singer-songwriter Taylor Swift's fifth studio album 1989.

In 2016, they won the "Grand Prize" at the Denniz Pop Awards.

== Discography ==
Year	Artist	Album	Details
2005	Maaya Sakamoto	Yūnagi Loop	Co-writer ("Hello")
2007	What's Up!	In Pose	Producer ("If I Told You Once")
2009	Helena Paparizou	Giro Apo T' Oneiro	Co-writer ("Tha 'Mai Allios")
2009	Arashi	My Girl	Co-writer, arranger ("Tokei Jikake no Umbrella")
2011	About E	N/A	Producer ("Dysfunctional")
2011	Eric Saade	Saade Vol. 1	Co-writer ("Timeless", "Hearts in the Air", "Made of Pop", "Stupid with You", "Echo")
2011	Wanessa	DNA	Co-writer ("DNA")
2011	Eric Saade	Saade Vol. 2	Co-writer ("Love Is Calling", "Fingerprints")
2012	Molly Sandén	Unchained	Co-writer, co-producer ("A Little Forgiveness")
2012	About E	N/A	Co-writer, producer ("Roll with Us")
2013	Anton Ewald	A	Co-writer, producer ("Human")
2013	Bara På Låtsas	Otecknat	Producer ("Hoppas Hoppas", "Ett steg fram", "Vad är jag")
2013	Majestee of Sweden	N/A	Co-writer, producer ("Governor", "Supergirl", "HELL YEAH", "Hot Damn!")
2013	Laza Morgan	One by One	Co-writer, producer ("Oh Eh Ya")
2013	Tal	À l'infini	Co-writer, additional producer ("Jealousy")
2014	Oscar Zia	I Don't Know How to Dance	Co-writer, producer ("Without U")
2014	Tone Damli	Heartkill	Co-writer, producer ("Smash", "Hello Goodbye")
2014	Eric Saade	N/A	Co-writer ("Take a Ride (Put 'Em in the Air)")
2014	Take That	III	Co-writer, producer ("Higher Than Higher")
2014	Taylor Swift	1989	Co-producer ("All You Had to Do Was Stay")
2014	Tove Lo	Truth Serum	Co-writer, co-producer ("Over")
2014	Tove Lo	Queen of the Clouds	Producer ("Moments")
2015	Adam Lambert	The Original High	Co-writer, co-producer ("The Original High")
2015	Carly Rae Jepsen	Emotion	Co-writer, co-producer ("Run Away with Me"), Co-writer, producer ("Gimmie Love", "Favourite Colour")
2015	DNCE	Swaay	Co-writer, producer ("Cake by the Ocean")
2015	Ellie Goulding	Fifty Shades of Grey	Backing-vocals, mastering ("Love Me like You Do")
2015	Hailee Steinfeld	Haiz	Co-writer, producer ("Love Myself", "You're Such A", "Rock Bottom", "Hell Nos and Headphones")
2015	Selena Gomez	Revival	Co-writer, co-producer ("Hands to Myself", "Me & the Rhythm")
2016	Gwen Stefani	This Is What the Truth Feels Like	Co-writer, producer ("Misery", "Make Me Like You", "Truth")
2016	Nick Jonas	Last Year Was Complicated	Co-writer, producer ("Close", "Touch")
2016	Britney Spears	Glory	Co-writer, producer ("Do You Wanna Come Over?", "Slumber Party", "Change Your Mind (No Seas Cortés)")
2016	Stanaj	The Preview	Co-writer, producer ("Sleep Alone")
2016	Dagny	Ultraviolet EP	Co-writer, producer ("Fight Sleep", "Too Young")
2016	DNCE	DNCE	Co-writer, producer ("Cake by the Ocean", "Good Day", "Naked")
2017	DNCE (featuring Nicki Minaj)	DNCE (Jumbo Edition)	Co-writer, producer ("Kissing Strangers")
2017	Julia Michaels	Nervous System	Co-writer, producer ("Uh Huh", "Worst in Me", "Make It Up to You", "Just Do It", "Pink")
2017	Imagine Dragons	Evolve	Co-writer, producer ("I Don't Know Why", "Believer", "Walking the Wire", "Start Over")
2017	Jason Derulo	N/A	Co-writer, producer ("If I'm Lucky")
2017	Dagny	N/A	Electric guitar, percussion ("Love You like That")
2017	Pink	Beautiful Trauma	Co-writer, producer ("For Now")
2018	Julia Michaels	Fifty Shades Freed	Co-writer, producer ("Are You")
2018	Janelle Monáe	Dirty Computer	Co-writer, producer ("Make Me Feel")
2018	Imagine Dragons	Origins	Co-writer, producer ("Natural", "Cool Out", "Only")
2018	Charli XCX	N/A	Co-writer, producer ("Real Friends")
2018	Raye	N/A	Co-writer, producer ("R U Sad?")
2018	Glowie	Where I Belong	Co-writer, producer ("Body")
2019	Dua Lipa	Alita: Battle Angel	Co-writer, co-producer ("Swan Song")
2019	Tove Lo	Sunshine Kitty	Co-writer, producer ("Equally Lost")
2019	Cashmere Cat	Princess Catgirl	Co-writer ("Without You")
2019	Anthony Ramos	The Good & the Bad	Co-writer, producer ("Mind over Matter", "Little Lies")
2019	Camila Cabello	Romance	Co-writer, producer ("Living Proof", "Dream of You")
2020	Selena Gomez	Rare	Co-writer, producer ("Lose You to Love Me", "Dance Again", "Let Me Get Me")
2020	YDE	N/A	Co-writer, producer ("Stopped Buying Diamonds")
2020	Tayla Parx	Coping Mechanisms	Co-writer, producer ("Residue")
2020	YDE	N/A	Co-writer, producer ("BlindLife")
2021	Celeste	Not Your Muse	Co-writer ("A Kiss")
2021	Zara Larsson	Poster Girl	Co-writer, producer ("Need Someone", "Right Here")
2021	Astrid S	N/A	Co-writer, producer ("Need Someone (Piano Demo)")
2021	Charli XCX	Crash	Co-writer ("Good Ones")
2021	Imagine Dragons	Mercury – Act 1	Co-writer, producer ("My Life", "Lonely")
2021	Imagine Dragons & JID	Mercury – Act 1	Co-writer, producer ("Enemy")
2022	OneRepublic	Japan Paradise: Tour Edition	Co-writer, producer ("West Coast")
2022	Imagine Dragons	Mercury – Act 2	Co-writer, producer ("Bones", "Sharks", "Waves")
2023	Måneskin	Rush!	Co-writer, producer ("FEEL")
2023	Imagine Dragons	Loom (Japanese Edition)	Co-writer, producer ("Children of the Sky (A Starfield Song)")
2024	YUNGBLUD	Kaiju No. 8	Co-writer, bass, keyboards ("Abyss")
2024	Imagine Dragons	Loom	Co-writer, producer ("Eyes Closed", "Nice to Meet You", "Wake Up", "Take Me to the Beach", "In Your Corner", "Gods Don't Pray", "Don't Forget Me", "Kid", "Fire in These Hills")
2024	Imagine Dragons & J Balvin	Loom	Co-writer, producer ("Eyes Closed", "Nice to Meet You", "Wake Up", "Take Me to the Beach", "In Your Corner", "Gods Don't Pray", "Don't Forget Me", "Kid", "Fire in These Hills")
2024	Imagine Dragons & Baker Boy	Loom	Co-writer, producer ("Eyes Closed", "Nice to Meet You", "Wake Up", "Take Me to the Beach", "In Your Corner", "Gods Don't Pray", "Don't Forget Me", "Kid", "Fire in These Hills")
2024	Imagine Dragons & Ernia	Loom	Co-writer, producer ("Eyes Closed", "Nice to Meet You", "Wake Up", "Take Me to the Beach", "In Your Corner", "Gods Don't Pray", "Don't Forget Me", "Kid", "Fire in These Hills")
2024	Imagine Dragons & Jungeli	Loom	Co-writer, producer ("Eyes Closed", "Nice to Meet You", "Wake Up", "Take Me to the Beach", "In Your Corner", "Gods Don't Pray", "Don't Forget Me", "Kid", "Fire in These Hills")
2024	Imagine Dragons & Ado	Loom	Co-writer, producer ("Eyes Closed", "Nice to Meet You", "Wake Up", "Take Me to the Beach", "In Your Corner", "Gods Don't Pray", "Don't Forget Me", "Kid", "Fire in These Hills")
2025	Selena Gomez, benny blanco & Gracie Abrams	I Said I Love You First	Co-writer ("Call Me When You Break Up")
2025	Julia Michaels	Second Self	Co-writer, producer ("Try Your Luck")
2025	Khalid	after the sun goes down	Co-writer, producer ("in plain sight")
2025	XO	Fashionably Late	Co-writer, co-producer ("Real Friends")
2025	Nora Fatehi & Shenseea	N/A	Co-writer, producer ("What Do I Know? (Just a Girl)")
2026	Katseye	N/A	Co-writer, producer ("Internet Girl")
2026	Freya Skye	stardust	Co-writer, producer, acoustic guitar, bass, drums, electric guitar, percussion, programming, synthesizer, arranger ("why'd you have to call")
2026	Kerr Mercer	N/A	Co-writer, producer ("Love Me Twice")
2026	Stephen Sanchez	LOVE, LOVE, LOVE	Co-writer, producer, background vocals, guitar, drums, percussion, keyboards, piano, programming ("IT MIGHT BE LOVE", "OOO BABY (I LOVE YOU)", "DANCE AWAY THE MUSIC", "YOU ARE SO BEAUTIFUL")
2026	Stephen Sanchez & Stephen Day	LOVE, LOVE, LOVE	Vocal producer, engineer ("HOME TO MOTHER")
2026	Rose Gray	N/A	Co-writer, producer, bass, drums, keyboards, programming ("Just Be Bodies")
