= Take Me to the Beach =

2024 song by Imagine Dragons

- Remix featuring Baker Boy cover art

Single by Imagine Dragons

from the album Loom
- Released: October 11, 2024
- Length: 2:47
- Label: Kidinakorner; Interscope
- Songwriters: Dan Reynolds; Wayne Sermon; Ben McKee; Mattias Larsson; Robin Fredriksson
- Producer: Mattman & Robin

Imagine Dragons singles chronology
"Stars Will Align" (2024)	"Take Me to the Beach" (2024)	"Dare U" (2025)

Baker Boy singles chronology
"King" (2024)	"Take Me to the Beach" (2024)	"Peacekeeper" (2025)

Ernia singles chronology
"Good Girl" (2024)	"Take Me to the Beach" (2024)	"Se Fosse Per Me" (2024)

Jungeli singles chronology
"L’envers du Décor" (2024)	"Take Me to the Beach" (2024)	"Évidemment" (2024)

Ado singles chronology
"Episode X" (2024)	"Take Me to the Beach" (2024)	"Elf" (2025)

Lyric video
- "Take Me to the Beach" on YouTube

"Take Me to the Beach" is a song by American band Imagine Dragons. It was released as a single through Kidinakorner and Interscope Records on October 11, 2024. The song was included on the band's sixth studio album Loom with four remixes also released featuring Baker Boy, Ernia, Jungeli, and Ado through to the end of 2024.

== Background and composition ==
"Take Me to the Beach" was written by band members Dan Reynolds, Wayne Sermon, Ben McKee with additional writing from producers Mattias Larsson and Robin Fredriksson. It was first teased on TikTok on May 28, 2024. The song's lyrics describe escaping typical life.

== Track listing ==
- Digital download
1. "Take Me to the Beach" – 2:47
- Digital download – Remixes
1. "Take Me to the Beach" (featuring Baker Boy) – 3:05
2. "Take Me to the Beach" (featuring Ernia) – 2:47
3. "Take Me to the Beach" (featuring Jungeli) – 2:47
4. "Take Me to the Beach" (featuring Ado) – 2:47

== Personnel ==
Credits for "Take Me to the Beach" adapted from Apple Music.

Musicians

- Dan Reynolds – lead vocals
- Wayne Sermon – guitar
- Ben McKee – bass guitar

Production

- Mattman & Robin – production
- Serban Ghenea – mixing
- Bryce Bordone – assistant mixing
- Randy Merrill – mastering
- John Armstrong – engineering
- Greg Eliason – engineering
- Jeremy Lertola – engineering

== Charts ==
Chart performance for "Take Me to the Beach"
Chart (2024)	Peak position
Italy (FIMI)	89
New Zealand Hot Singles (RMNZ)	17
US Hot Rock & Alternative Songs (Billboard)	27
Venezuela Anglo Airplay (Monitor Latino)	14

== Certifications ==
Certifications for "Take Me to the Beach"
Region	Certification	Certified units/sales
Brazil (Pro-Música Brasil)	Gold	20,000^{‡}
France (SNEP)	Gold	100,000^{‡}
^{‡} Sales+streaming figures based on certification alone.
