= Wake Up (Imagine Dragons song) =

2024 song by Imagine Dragons

Single by Imagine Dragons

from the album Loom
- Released: July 2, 2024
- Length: 2:47
- Label: Kidinakorner; Interscope
- Songwriters: Dan Reynolds; Wayne Sermon; Ben McKee; Mattias Larsson; Robin Fredriksson
- Producer: Mattman & Robin

Imagine Dragons singles chronology
"Nice to Meet You" (2024)	"Wake Up" (2024)	"Stars Will Align" (2024)

Music video
- "Wake Up" on YouTube

"Wake Up" is a song by American band Imagine Dragons as the third single and opening track from their sixth studio album Loom. It was released through Kidinakorner and Interscope Records on July 2, 2024.

== Background and composition ==
"Wake Up" was written by band members Dan Reynolds, Wayne Sermon, and Ben McKee and Mattman & Robin who also produced the track. A snippet of the song, along with snippets of "Fire in These Hills" and "Nice to Meet You", were shared to the winning Croyants team on the band's four doors website. In an interview with NPR, Reynolds described the background of the song:

It's really about waking up from my own mind. I get really numb very easy. When I was in middle school...I found myself being quite cloudy in my head and started therapy at a pretty young age and found that I kind of have to get out of my own head, and ["Wake Up"] is just about that. I would sit down and kind of write down points for my therapist in my notebook about who I wanted to be.

— Dan Reynolds

== Music video ==
The music video for "Wake Up" premiered on July 2, 2024 and was directed by Matt Eastin. The video features Dan Reynolds checking into a hotel and try to fall asleep. Instead he is interrupted by multicolored lights and it transported to the roof of the hotel. At the end, Reynolds wakes up in his bed and puts a "Do not disturb" tag on the outside of his door. The video was nominated for a 2025 MTV VMA in the category of Best Alternative Video.

== Personnel ==
Credits for "Wake Up" adapted from Apple Music.

Musicians
- Dan Reynolds – vocals
- Wayne Sermon – guitar
- Ben McKee – bass guitar
Production
- Mattman & Robin – production
- John Armstrong – engineering
- Greg Eliason – engineering
- Jeremy Lertola – engineering
- Serban Ghenea – mixing
- Bryce Bordone – assistant mixing
- Randy Merrill – mastering

== Charts ==
=== Weekly charts ===
Weekly chart performance for "Wake Up"
Chart (2024)	Peak position
New Zealand Hot Singles (RMNZ)	12
San Marino Airplay (SMRTV Top 50)	7
Slovakia Airplay (ČNS IFPI)	21
Switzerland (Schweizer Hitparade)	78
US Hot Rock & Alternative Songs (Billboard)	27
US Rock & Alternative Airplay (Billboard)	26

=== Monthly charts ===
Monthly chart performance for "Wake Up"
Chart (2024)	Position
Slovakia (Rádio Top 100)	33

== Certifications ==
Certifications for "Wake Up"
Region	Certification	Certified units/sales
Brazil (Pro-Música Brasil)	Platinum	40,000^{‡}
^{‡} Sales+streaming figures based on certification alone.
