= Not Today (Imagine Dragons song) =

2016 song by Imagine Dragons

Single by Imagine Dragons

from the album Me Before You (soundtrack)
- Released: April 29, 2016
- Length: 4:21
- Label: Interscope
- Songwriters: Dan Reynolds; Wayne Sermon; Ben McKee; Daniel Platzman; Mike Daly
- Producer: Imagine Dragons

Imagine Dragons singles chronology
"I Was Me" (2015)	"Not Today" (2016)	"Sucker for Pain" (2016)

Licensed audio
- "Not Today" on YouTube

"Not Today" is a song by American pop rock band Imagine Dragons. The song was released through Interscope on April 29, 2016, from the romantic drama film Me Before You based on Jojo Moyes' 2012 novel of the same name. It was released as the second single and ending track from the film's soundtrack following the Erich Lee remix of X Ambassadors' "Unsteady". It also appears on the deluxe edition of Imagine Dragons' third studio album Evolve. The song was played live for the first time at a benefit concert on the release date at Velour Live Music Gallery in Provo, Utah.

== Background and composition ==
"Not Today" was written by band members Dan Reynolds, Wayne Sermon, Ben McKee, Daniel Platzman as well as Mike Daly. The song was also produced by the band. The song is an acoustic guitar ballad with lyrics that deal with the pain of not being with a loved one. The title, "Not Today", refers to how life will get easier, but not today.

== Personnel ==
Credits for "Not Today" adapted from Apple Music.

Musicians

- Dan Reynolds – lead vocals, composition
- Wayne Sermon – lead guitar, composition
- Ben McKee – bass guitar, composition
- Daniel Platzman – keyboards, composition
- Mike Daly – composition

Production

- Imagine Dragons – production
- Robert Orton – mixing

== Charts ==
Chart performance for "Not Today"
Chart (2016)	Peak position
US Hot Rock & Alternative Songs (Billboard)	17
