= Hold On Me (Kygo and Sandro Cavazza song) =

"Hold on Me"

Single by Kygo and Sandro Cavazza
- Released: 15 November 2024
- Length: 2:52
- Label: Ultra; Sony
- Songwriters: Kyrre Gørvell-Dahll; Sandro Cavazza
- Producer: Kygo

Kygo singles chronology
"Stars Will Align" (2024)	"Hold on Me" (2024)	"Chasing Paradise" (2025)

"Hold on Me" is a song by Norwegian DJ and record producer Kygo and Swedish singer Sandro Cavazza. The song was released on 15 November 2024.

== Charts ==
=== Weekly charts ===
Weekly chart performance
Chart (2024–2025)	Peak position
Belarus Airplay (TopHit)	27
CIS Airplay (TopHit)	9
Estonia Airplay (TopHit)	16
Kazakhstan Airplay (TopHit)	6
Latvia Airplay (TopHit)	11
Lithuania Airplay (TopHit)	1
Moldova Airplay (TopHit)	38
Norway (VG-lista)	25
Poland (Polish Airplay Top 100)	7
Russia Airplay (TopHit)	9
Sweden (Sverigetopplistan)	49
Ukraine Airplay (TopHit)	66

=== Monthly charts ===
Monthly chart performance
Chart (2025)	Peak position
Belarus Airplay (TopHit)	27
CIS Airplay (TopHit)	11
Estonia Airplay (TopHit)	22
Kazakhstan Airplay (TopHit)	9
Latvia Airplay (TopHit)	22
Lithuania Airplay (TopHit)	54
Moldova Airplay (TopHit)	37
Russia Airplay (TopHit)	13

=== Year-end charts ===
Year-end chart performance
Chart (2025)	Position
Belarus Airplay (TopHit)	166
Kazakhstan Airplay (TopHit)	26
Latvia Airplay (TopHit)	134
Poland (Polish Airplay Top 100)	43
Russia Airplay (TopHit)	33
