= I Was Me =

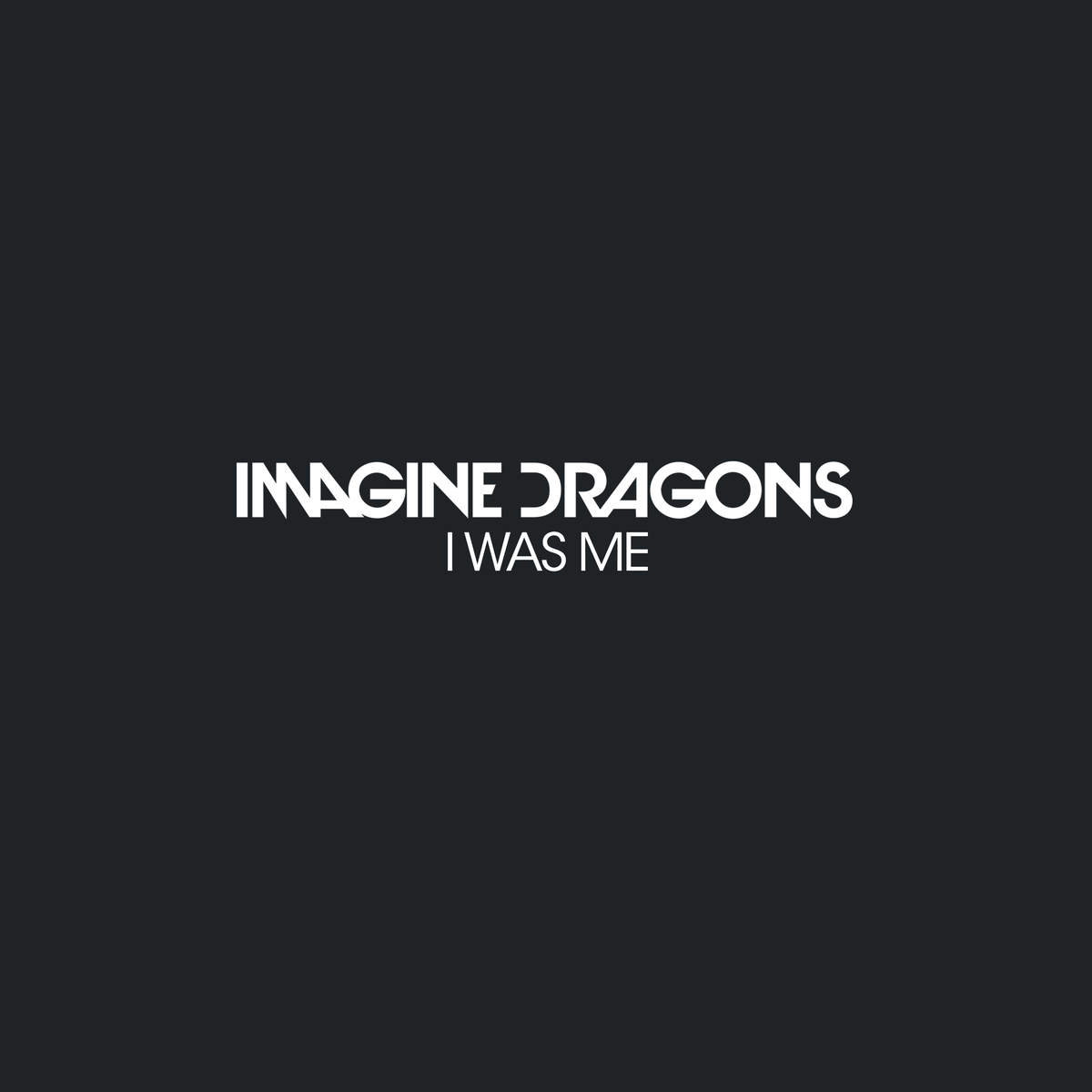

Single by Imagine Dragons
- Released: October 12, 2015
- Recorded: 2015
- Genre: Acoustic rock
- Length: 3:16

Imagine Dragons singles chronology
"Roots" (2015)	"I Was Me" (2015)	"Not Today" (2016)

Licensed audio
- "I Was Me" on YouTube

"I Was Me" is a charity single by American pop rock band Imagine Dragons.

== Background ==
On October 12, 2015, "I Was Me" was released to iTunes Stores for the One4 project with all proceeds going to the UN Refugee Agency to support fleeing refugees, particularly in the Middle East. SAP and Imagine Dragons partnered together to release the song. Lead singer Dan Reynolds wrote an op-ed piece about the crisis for Medium that was published on October 24, 2015.

== Charts ==
Chart (2015)	Peak position
Belgium (Ultratip Bubbling Under Flanders)	77
Belgium (Ultratip Bubbling Under Wallonia)	45
France (SNEP)	82
Hungary (Single Top 40)	15
Spain (Promusicae)	30
US Digital Song Sales (Billboard)	46
US Hot Rock & Alternative Songs (Billboard)	17
