= Loom (Imagine Dragons album) =

Studio album by Imagine Dragons
- Released: June 28, 2024
- Recorded: 2022–2024
- Studios: MXM (Los Angeles); Conway (Los Angeles); Westlake (Los Angeles); House Mouse (Stockholm)
- Length: 28:07
- Labels: Kidinakorner; Interscope
- Producer: Mattman & Robin

Imagine Dragons chronology
Mercury – Acts 1 & 2 (2022)	Loom (2024)	Reflections (from the Vault of Smoke + Mirrors) (2025)

Singles from Loom
- 1. "Eyes Closed" Released: April 3, 2024; 2. "Nice to Meet You" Released: May 24, 2024; 3. "Wake Up" Released: July 2, 2024; 4. "Take Me to the Beach" Released: October 11, 2024

Loom is the sixth studio album by American pop rock band Imagine Dragons, released through Kidinakorner and Interscope Records on June 28, 2024. The standard version comprises nine tracks, the fewest on an Imagine Dragons album to date. Produced by the band and longtime collaborators Mattman & Robin, it follows their two-part studio album Mercury – Acts 1 & 2 (2022). The album marks the band's first release as a trio, due to drummer Daniel Platzman announcing an indefinite hiatus from the band in March 2023, later departing from the band in August 2024.

The album received generally positive reviews from music critics, and peaked at number 22 on the US Billboard 200.

== Background and concept ==
Every Imagine Dragons album prior to Loom had followed relatively the same creative process - the band would enter the studio with 100-200 demos, and narrow it down to the final batch of songs on an album. Imagine Dragons initially followed the same process for this album, entering the studio with 150 demos written during the Mercury tour, until producers Mattman & Robin had made a suggestion to switch things up by starting over from scratch. The band proceeded to write and record 30 songs for Loom over six months, the smallest amount of material Imagine Dragons had ever created for a studio album.

The album name was inspired by the video game of the same name, with Reynolds quoting it as his introduction to music at six years old. A main theme of Loom is "new beginnings", paralleling both Reynolds' love life of divorcing his wife and beginning to date actress Minka Kelly, as well as the absence of Platzman during the album's creation.

In an interview with the Associated Press, lead singer Dan Reynolds described the creative process behind the album and its cover:

You can't really tell if it's a sunset or a sunrise, and then there are two people kind of separated standing in front of it. That really kind of sums it up thematically when I listen to it. Is the beginning of something new, or is this the end of something? And the sunset and the sunrise always kind of feels that way to me. It could be either/or.

== Singles and promotion ==
On March 10, 2024, the band began teasing new music on their social media. In the following days, a sand clock was displayed on the official website. By the end of March, the website started showing four doors. The four doors consisted on three different groups competing to get points on multiple mini games; the three groups were Croyants (Believers), Guerriers (Warriors) and Rêveurs (Dreamers), divided according to previous music preference of the users. Each of these groups were referencing a song from the band: "Believer", "Warriors" and "Dream".

Each week, a new door was revealed, showing a new game and some clues about the release date or some of the new songs' lyrics. On April 1, with the opening of the second door, they announced a new song titled "Eyes Closed" would be released on April 3. On April 22, after all four doors were opened, a fifth door –referencing the "Eyes Closed" music video– was revealed, which finally confirmed the new album's name to be LOOM. Additionally, a new world tour was announced to begin during the summer.

For the winning team of the four doors, the Croyants, a video was shared with snippets for three songs from the new album, titled: "Fire in These Hills", "Nice to Meet You" and "Wake Up".

On April 25, a post on social media from the band's official accounts teased a new collaboration. On April 30, their official account announced a new version of "Eyes Closed" featuring Colombian singer J Balvin. It was released on May 3.

The official track list, along with the song lengths, were unveiled on May 8.

A second single "Nice to Meet You" was released on May 24.

The band released a music video for "Wake Up" on July 2.

A remix of "Take Me to the Beach" featuring Baker Boy was released on October 11. Another featuring Ernia was released on October 18. A third remix with Jungeli was released on November 1, followed by a fourth with Ado on December 16.

== Critical reception ==
Professional ratings
Aggregate scores
Source	Rating
Metacritic	67/100
Review scores
Source	Rating
AllMusic	4/5 stars
The Arts Desk	3/5 stars
Clash	6/10
Classic Rock	2/5 stars
Rolling Stone	3/5 stars

Loom received generally positive reviews from music critics. At Metacritic, which assigns a normalized rating out of 100 to reviews from mainstream critics, the album received an average score of 67, based on 4 reviews, which indicates "generally favorable reviews". This is the first time one of the band's albums received a positive score.

Neil Z. Yeung of AllMusic gave the album a positive review, stating "longtime fans of their aggressive empowerment anthems will delight in this pseudo-'return to form' from the Vegas quartet" and described it as "one of their most satisfying and immediate sets to date". Jon Dolan of Rolling Stone said that the album "finds the band piloting some musical and personal transitions" and later concluding that "Such kind-vibes moments show that within the vast spaces these guys work in, there's always room for growth". Tom Carr of The Arts Desk remarked that "[LOOM] may not be challenging to listen to, but it can't be denied that Imagine Dragons have a knack for bringing together various textures, and condensing them into something that goes down smooth" and said that "Overall, LOOM pleases without blazing any new trails". Robin Murray of Clash gave the album a mixed review, summarizing that it was a "succinct if somewhat unfulfilling return".

== Commercial performance ==
Loom debuted at number 22 on the US Billboard 200 with 28,000 album-equivalent units. It is the band's first album to not peak in the top ten of the chart, as well as their first to not have a song chart on the Billboard Hot 100.

== Track listing ==
All tracks are written by Dan Reynolds, Wayne Sermon, Ben McKee, Mattias Larsson, and Robin Fredriksson, except where noted.

Loom track listing
No.	Title	Writer(s)	Length
1.	"Wake Up"		2:47
2.	"Nice to Meet You"		3:10
3.	"Eyes Closed"		3:20
4.	"Take Me to the Beach"		2:47
5.	"In Your Corner"		4:00
6.	"Gods Don't Pray"		2:50
7.	"Don't Forget Me"		2:59
8.	"Kid"		2:40
9.	"Fire in These Hills"	Reynolds; Sermon; McKee	3:39
Total length:			28:07

Deluxe edition and Japanese edition bonus track
No.	Title	Writer(s)	Length
10.	"Eyes Closed" (with J Balvin)	Reynolds; Sermon; McKee; José Osorio; Luis Ángel O'Neill Laureano; Larsson; Frediksson	3:20
Total length:			31:27

Japanese edition bonus track
No.	Title	Writer(s)	Length
11.	"Children of the Sky (A Starfield Song)"	Reynolds; Sermon; McKee; Inon Zur; Larsson; Fredriksson	3:28
Total length:			34:54

== Personnel ==
Credits for Loom are taken from the album's liner notes and Tidal.

Imagine Dragons

- Dan Reynolds
- Wayne Sermon
- Ben McKee

Production

- All songs produced by: Mattman & Robin for Wolf Cousins Productions.
- Recorded at: MXM Studios (Los Angeles, California), Conway Studios (Los Angeles, California), Westlake Studios (West Hollywood, California) and House Mouse Studios (Stockholm, Sweden).
- Engineered by: Jeremy Lertola at MXM Studios, John Armstrong at Conway Studios and Greg Eliason at Westlake Studios
- Mixed by: Serban Ghenea at MixStar Studios (Virginia Beach, Virginia)
- Assistant Mix Engineer: Bryce Bordone.
- Mastered by Randy Merrill at Sterling Sound (New York)

== Charts ==
=== Weekly charts ===
Weekly chart performance for Loom
Chart (2024–2025)	Peak position
Australian Albums (ARIA)	17
Austrian Albums (Ö3 Austria)	3
Belgian Albums (Ultratop Flanders)	6
Belgian Albums (Ultratop Wallonia)	1
Canadian Albums (Billboard)	23
Czech Albums (ČNS IFPI)	30
Dutch Albums (Album Top 100)	3
Finnish Albums (Suomen virallinen lista)	19
French Albums (SNEP)	1
German Albums (Offizielle Top 100)	2
Hungarian Albums (MAHASZ)	7
Irish Albums (IRMA)	62
Italian Albums (FIMI)	9
Lithuanian Albums (AGATA)	6
New Zealand Albums (RMNZ)	12
Norwegian Albums (VG-lista)	14
Polish Albums (ZPAV)	4
Portuguese Albums (AFP)	18
Scottish Albums (Official Charts)	1
Slovak Albums (IFPI)	27
Spanish Albums (Promusicae)	4
Swedish Albums (Sverigetopplistan)	18
Swiss Albums (Schweizer Hitparade)	1
UK Albums (Official Charts)	5
US Billboard 200	22
US Top Rock & Alternative Albums (Billboard)	6

=== Year-end charts ===
2024 year-end chart performance for Loom
Chart (2024)	Position
French Albums (SNEP)	66
Swiss Albums (Schweizer Hitparade)	61

2025 year-end chart performance for Loom
Chart (2025)	Position
Belgian Albums (Ultratop Wallonia)	180
French Albums (SNEP)	143

== Certifications ==
Certifications for Loom
Region	Certification	Certified units/sales
France (SNEP)	Gold	50,000^{‡}
Poland (ZPAV)	Gold	10,000^{‡}
^{‡} Sales+streaming figures based on certification alone.
