= Fall Tour 2012 =

2012 concert tour by Imagine Dragons

- National tour by Imagine Dragons
- Location: United States
- Start date: September 5, 2012
- End date: November 16, 2012
- Legs: 2
- No. of shows: 28

Imagine Dragons concert chronology
- Fall Tour 2012 (2012); Night Visions Tour (2013–14)

The "Fall Tour of 2012" was the first tour by American rock band Imagine Dragons that was held between September and November 2012. In the whole tour, the band toured North America.

== Tour dates ==
List of 2012 concerts
Date	City	Country	Venue
September 5, 2012	Las Vegas	United States	Hard Rock Cafe
September 7, 2012	New York City	United States	Santos Party House
September 8, 2012	Philadelphia	United States	Piazza at Schmidt's
September 10, 2012	Portland	United States	State Theatre
September 11, 2012	Hartford	United States	Great Hall at Union Station
September 13, 2012	Pittsburgh	United States	Altar Bar
September 15, 2012	Covington	United States	Madison Theatre
September 16, 2012	Chicago	United States	Congress Theatre
September 18, 2012	Detroit	United States	St. Andrews Hall
September 19, 2012	Columbus	United States	Newport Music Hall
September 21, 2012	Indianapolis	United States	Egyptian Room
September 22, 2012	St. Louis	United States	The Pageant
September 23, 2012	Kansas City	United States	Uptown Theatre
September 27, 2012	Denver	United States	The Summit Music Hall
September 28, 2012	Denver	United States	The Summit Music Hall
October 1, 2012	Boise	United States	Knitting Factory
October 3, 2012	Portland	United States	Roseland Theatre
October 4, 2012	Portland	United States	Roseland Theatre
October 9, 2012	San Diego	United States	House of Blues
October 10, 2012	Santa Ana	United States	The Observatory
October 11, 2012	Los Angeles	United States	Club Nokia Live
October 15, 2012	Tucson	United States	Rialto Theatre
October 16, 2012	Albuquerque	United States	Sunshine Theatre
October 18, 2012	Austin	United States	Emo's East
October 20, 2012	Dallas	United States	House of Blues
October 23, 2012	Atlanta	United States	Tabernacle
October 24, 2012	Tampa	United States	The Ritz Ybor
October 25, 2012	Orlando	United States	House of Blues
