= Eyes Closed (Imagine Dragons song) =

2024 song by Imagine Dragons

Single by Imagine Dragons

from the album Loom
- Released: April 3, 2024
- Genre: Rap rock; pop; alternative rock; dubstep
- Length: 3:20
- Label: KIDinaKORNER; Interscope Records
- Songwriters: Dan Reynolds; Wayne Sermon; Ben McKee; Robin Fredriksson; Mattias Larsson
- Producer: Mattman & Robin

Imagine Dragons singles chronology
"Children of the Sky" (2023)	"Eyes Closed" (2024)	"Nice to Meet You" (2024)

Music video
- "Eyes Closed" on YouTube

"Eyes Closed" is a song by American pop rock band Imagine Dragons, released as the lead single off the band's sixth studio album, Loom on April 3, 2024. The song was released through Interscope and Kidinakorner the same day as the music video. It was written by Dan Reynolds, Wayne Sermon, Ben McKee and producers Mattman & Robin.

A remix of the song with Colombian singer J Balvin was released on May 3.

== Background and themes ==
The song has been described as a mix of rap-rock, pop and alternative rock, with some dubstep. In a statement, Reynolds said of the new track:

After taking some time off the road and spending time catching up with family and loved ones, I finally have felt the desire to go back to the sonic places that originally brought me the most joy, but with a new outlook and mentality. The world looks much different after being a band for more than a decade. But some things will always remain the same. It’s finding that right balance of nostalgia and freshness that brings me the most joy in the studio. We had a lot of fun making this one and hope you enjoy it too.

== Promotion and release ==
In March 2024, "Eyes Closed" was first teased following the latest release of "Children of the Sky (a Starfield song)" through various snippets, following secret codes and riddles to solve through their official website. Another snippet was released on March 27, alongside a team-based event that sorted fans into respective teams (Croyants, Reveurs, or Guerriers) based on their choices on a quick survey.

The remix with J Balvin was released on May 3.

"Eyes Closed" is featured on the soundtrack to EA Sports' NHL 25, marking the band's third song in a soundtrack of the NHL video game series.

The song appeared in the video package between Cody Rhodes and Roman Reigns for the Undisputed WWE Universal Championship match at WrestleMania XL.

== Music video ==
Directed by Andrew Donoho, the video follows Imagine Dragons lead singer Dan Reynolds, who appears to wake up from death—emerging from piles of sand—in a strange world, where he encounters ancient ruins. In his journey, he encounters four doors, but he cannot seem to escape from this place, until eventually a fifth door is unveiled that he must pass through. These strange-looking ruins turn out to be a dream from his subconscious spinning a near-death experience, from the aftermath of a car crash. The video ends with Reynolds leaving the scene and walking into the street.

== Charts ==
=== Weekly charts ===
Weekly chart performance for "Eyes Closed"
Chart (2024–2025)	Peak position
Belgium (Ultratop 50 Wallonia)	40
Canada Hot 100 (Billboard)	89
Canada Hot AC (Billboard)	34
CIS Airplay (TopHit)	117
Croatia International Airplay (Top lista)	12
Czech Republic Airplay (ČNS IFPI)	8
Czech Republic Singles Digital (ČNS IFPI)	38
Estonia Airplay (TopHit)	75
Estonia Airplay (TopHit) featuring J Balvin	50
France (SNEP)	35
Global 200 (Billboard)	101
Greece International (IFPI)	73
Israel (Media Forest)	6
Japan Hot Overseas (Billboard Japan)	15
Latvia Airplay (TopHit)	6
Lebanon English (Lebanese Top 20)	20
Lithuania Airplay (TopHit)	17
Lithuania Airplay (TopHit) featuring J Balvin	77
Netherlands (Dutch Top 40)	36
New Zealand Hot Singles (RMNZ)	14
New Zealand Hot Singles (RMNZ) featuring J Balvin	19
Poland (Polish Airplay Top 100)	32
Poland (Polish Streaming Top 100)	93
Portugal (AFP)	151
San Marino Airplay (SMRTV Top 50)	14
Serbia Airplay (Radiomonitor)	14
Slovakia Airplay (ČNS IFPI)	1
Slovakia Singles Digital (ČNS IFPI)	12
Switzerland (Schweizer Hitparade)	45
Turkey International Airplay (Radiomonitor Türkiye)	10
UK Singles (OCC)	78
US Bubbling Under Hot 100 (Billboard)	2
US Adult Pop Airplay (Billboard)	32
US Hot Rock & Alternative Songs (Billboard)	13
US Rock & Alternative Airplay (Billboard)	8

=== Monthly charts ===
Monthly chart performance for "Eyes Closed"
Chart (2024)	Position
Czech Republic (Rádio Top 100)	18
Estonia Airplay (TopHit)	91
Estonia Airplay (TopHit) featuring J Balvin	84
Latvia Airplay (TopHit)	27
Lithuania Airplay (TopHit)	19
Slovakia (Rádio Top 100)	1

=== Year-end charts ===
Year-end chart performance for "Eyes Closed"
Chart (2024)	Position
France (SNEP)	147
US Hot Rock & Alternative Songs (Billboard)	46
US Rock Airplay (Billboard)	37

== Certifications ==
Certifications for "Eyes Closed"
Region	Certification	Certified units/sales
Brazil (Pro-Música Brasil)	2× Platinum	80,000^{‡}
Canada (Music Canada)	Gold	40,000^{‡}
France (SNEP)	Platinum	200,000^{‡}
Poland (ZPAV)	Gold	25,000^{‡}
^{‡} Sales+streaming figures based on certification alone.
