= Matt Eastin =

American music video, documentary and commercial director and editor

- Born: June 3, 1979 (age 46)
- Occupations: Director, editor
- Notable work: Music videos for Imagine Dragons and Benson Boone

Matt Eastin (born June 3, 1979) is an American music video, documentary, and commercial director and editor. He is best known for his work with Imagine Dragons, and Benson Boone, directing multiple projects for both artists. Four official music videos, directed by Eastin, have been nominated for MTV VMA awards and two of them have been declared winners.

Matt got his start by doing free music videos for bands in the Utah music scene, which were part of a collective production team called The Occidental Saloon. Eastin then co-created and directed the AUDIO-FILES TV series, which featured documentaries and live performances of indie bands in their home cities, such as The Head & the Heart, Low, Neon Trees, and Mates of State. Matt has also directed and edited a number of commercial campaigns for Lagoon, an amusement park in Utah.

In 2017, Matt partnered with Adobe Premiere and Imagine Dragons during the Adobe "Make The Cut" contest, which allowed fans and amateur editors to re-edit the raw footage from the Imagine Dragons "Believer" music video for prizes.

In 2018, the "Whatever it Takes" music video, by Imagine Dragons, that Eastin co-directed with Aaron Hymes, won an MTV VMA for "Best Rock Video." The video was shot on the stage of the "O" Theater at the Bellagio in Las Vegas, and included Cirque Du Soleil performers. On February 12, 2025, the video surpassed one billion views on YouTube.

In 2021, Eastin directed the "Follow You" music video, by Imagine Dragons, which was nominated for an MTV VMA, under the "Best Alternative Video" category. It starred Rob McElhenney and Kaitlin Olson and was shot in the Venetian Theater, in Las Vegas.

In 2021, Eastin also directed Benson Boone's first official music video, featuring his song "Ghost Town," which was shot in Boone's hometown of Monroe, Washington.

In 2023, Eastin directed and produced "Imagine Dragons Live in Vegas," a Hulu Original, which showcased an Imagine Dragons concert, filmed at Allegiant Stadium in 2022. It documented the band's rise to fame and how Las Vegas played a role in shaping their sound.

In 2024, Eastin directed the music video for Beautiful Things by Benson Boone, which was filmed near St. George, Utah. The video garnered half a million views within an hour of premiering, and won an MTV VMA for "Best Alternative Video."

In 2025, Eastin's "Wake Up" music video, for Imagine Dragons was nominated for a VMA, under the category of "Best Alternative Video." The video was shot at the El Cortez Hotel in Las Vegas in the Jackie Gaughan owner's suite.
