= Do the Write Thing =

American organization

- Founded: 1994
- Type: Non-profit
- Purpose: Violence reduction
- Location: Washington, D.C.
- Website: http://www.dtwt.org/

The Do the Write Thing Challenge (or DtWT) is a writing program for junior high students organized by the U.S. National Campaign to Stop Violence. Intended to reduce youth violence, the Do the Write Thing Essay Challenge Program began in 1994 as a local program in Washington, D.C. and expanded in 1996 to other cities. According to Dr. Hassan Al-Ebraheem, founder and chairman of the Kuwait-America Foundation, the program has reached over 1.6 million children (as of July 2013) across the country since its foundation.

Aimed at middle school students, one of the program's primary objectives is to motivate students to make a personal commitment, in writing, to help prevent and reduce youth violence in their home, school, and communities. The students are then asked to address these three questions in an essay for submission:

1. How has youth violence and drugs affected my life?
2. What are the causes of youth violence?
3. What can I do about youth violence?

After this, a panel, usually composed of volunteers or school staff, reads the essays and chooses "school finalists". These “school finalists” continue on to a broader selection that is citywide. Each year, two finalists from each city—one boy and one girl—along with their teacher and parent, are honored at a national recognition ceremony in Washington, DC. While in Washington, DC, the DTWT National Ambassadors visit the United States Library of Congress, The United States Supreme Court, the United States Capitol and the Kuwait Embassy. Their essays are published in one volume, which is then presented to the Library of Congress.

The Challenge is the idea of Daniel Q. Callister, a Washington lawyer who says its purpose is four-fold: to provide children who have experienced or seen violence with a cathartic experience; to give them motivation to change their behavior; to be an education experience for teachers and the community; and to get adults to help solve the problem.

Sponsors of "Do the Write Thing" include:

- Kuwait America Foundation
- Kuwait Foundation for the Advancement of Science
- Annenberg Foundation
- Criminal Justice Division of the Governor’s Office in Texas
- Marriott International
- Pennsylvania Department of Community and Economic Development
- Southwest Airlines
- Athletes for Hope
- America’s Promise Alliance
- Communities in Schools
- Greater Washington Urban League, Inc.
- Harlem Globetrotters
- National Counsel of Juvenile and Family Court Judges
- United States National Guard
