= Dan Reynolds =

American singer and songwriter (born 1987)

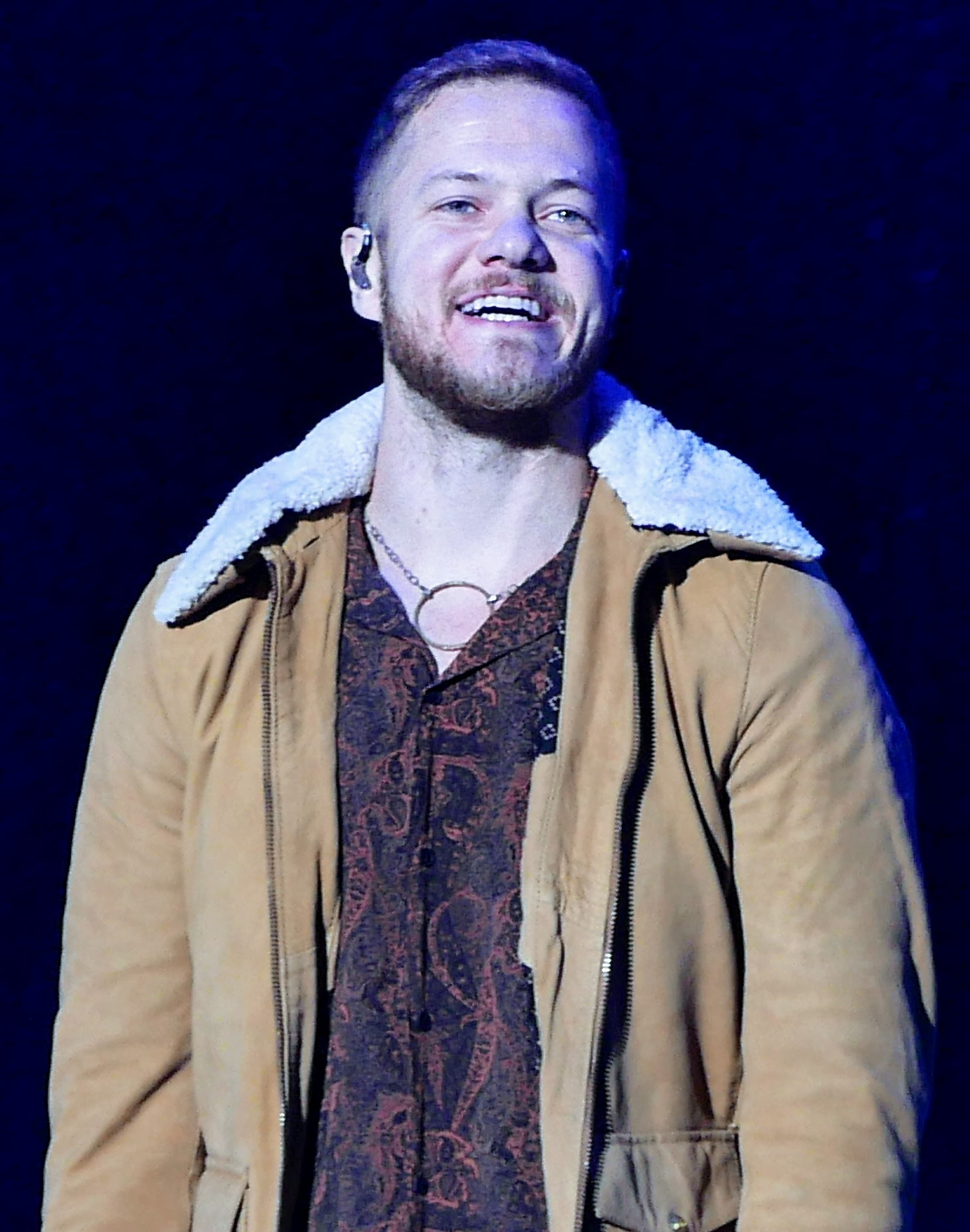
- Reynolds in 2017
- Born: Daniel Coulter Reynolds; July 14, 1987 (age 39); Las Vegas, Nevada, U.S.
- Occupations: Singer; songwriter; record producer; musician
- Years active: 2008–present
- Spouse: Aja Volkman (m. 2011; div. 2024)
- Partner: Minka Kelly (2022–2026)
- Children: 4
- Musical career
- Genres: Alternative rock; indie rock; pop rock; indie pop; electropop
- Instruments: Vocals; guitar; piano; keyboards; drums; percussion
- Label: Interscope
- Member of: Imagine Dragons
- Formerly of: Egyptian
- Website: imaginedragonsmusic.com
- Reynolds' singing voice Covering "Every Breath You Take" at an Imagine Dragons concert in Istanbul Reynolds' speaking voice On how he got into music and his influences

Daniel Coulter Reynolds (born July 14, 1987) is an American singer, songwriter, musician, and record producer. He is the lead vocalist and a founding member of the pop rock band Imagine Dragons, which he formed in 2008. Born and raised in Las Vegas, Reynolds is a recipient of the Songwriters Hall of Fame Hal David Starlight Award.

== Early life ==
Reynolds was born in Las Vegas, the seventh of nine children (eight boys and one girl) of Christene M. (née Callister) and Ronald Reynolds, a lawyer and author. Both are natives of Nevada, and Reynolds is a fourth generation Nevadan. As a Boy Scout he earned the rank of Eagle Scout in 2005. Reynolds was a member of the Church of Jesus Christ of Latter-day Saints (LDS Church). When he was 19 years old he volunteered full-time as a missionary in Nebraska for two years. As early as 2022, Reynolds explained that he was no longer a practicing member of the LDS Church.

Reynolds wrote the song "I Bet My Life" celebrating and reflecting on his enduring relationship with his parents. Following his graduation from Bonanza High School, he attended University of Nevada, Las Vegas, after losing his ecclesiastical endorsement for Brigham Young University (BYU). Reynolds then transferred to BYU after serving an LDS mission, where he studied communications, marketing, and music and excelled academically. While at BYU, he formed Imagine Dragons and won the school's Battle of the Bands competition before leaving to pursue music full-time. (Note: Reynolds did not graduate from BYU.)

== Career ==
=== Imagine Dragons (2008–present) ===
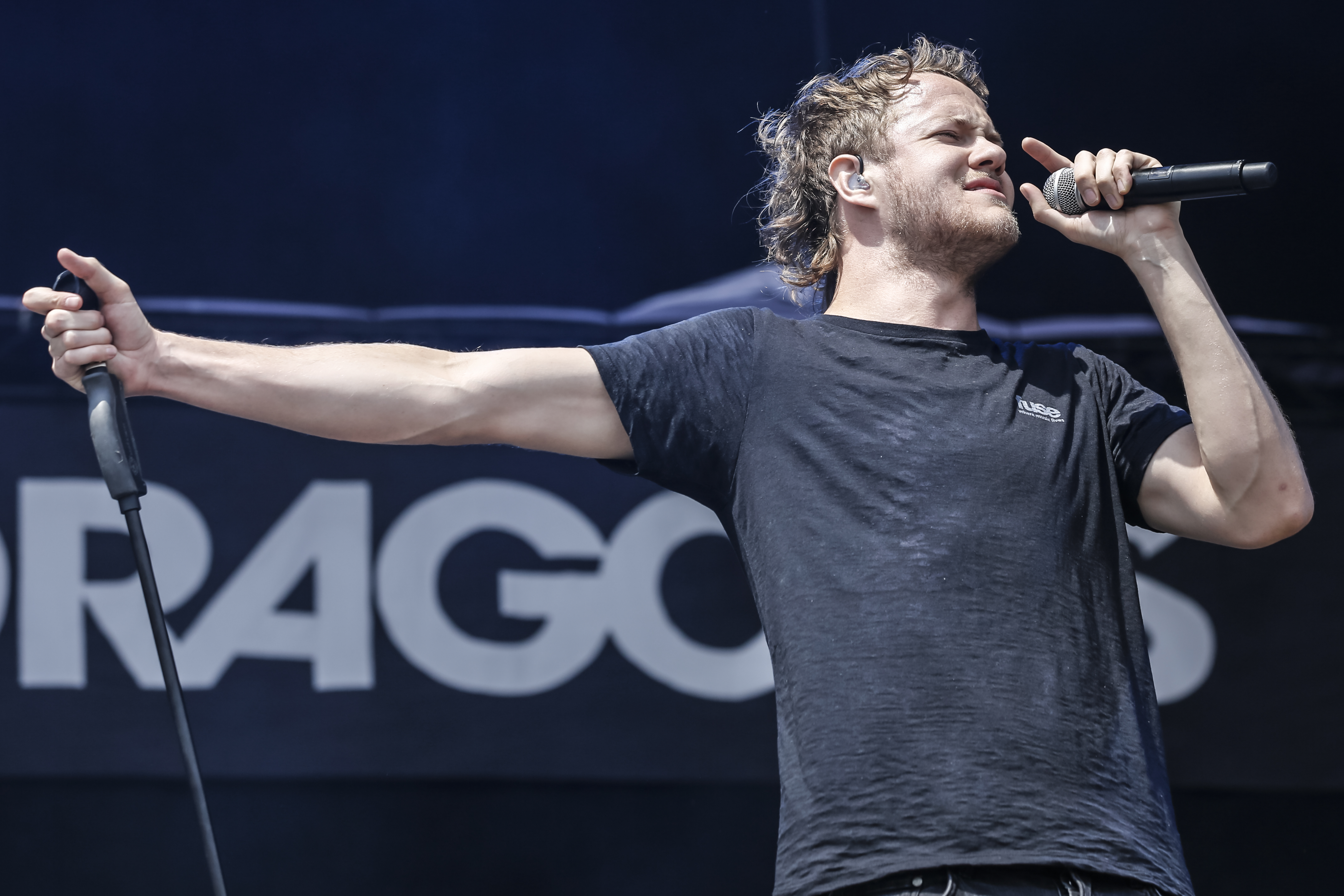
Dan Reynolds performing with Imagine Dragons at Rock im Park 2013

Reynolds was initially reluctant to become a professional musician, partially because future bandmate Wayne Sermon had once told him: "Don't do music because you want to do music - do music if you have to do music". After he began attending Brigham Young University, Reynolds found that he could not "do anything else" and committed fully to a professional music career. In Utah, Reynolds met and recruited drummer Andrew Tolman to form Imagine Dragons. With Reynolds as lead vocalist, Imagine Dragons won BYU's "Battle of the Bands" and other local competitions. Bassist Ben McKee joined the band in Las Vegas and after Tolman's departure 2011 invited Daniel Platzman, also a friend of Sermon's from Berklee College of Music, to play drums, thus completing the group's longest-standing lineup. The band relocated to Las Vegas, where they began performing almost nightly as a lounge act. It was there in 2009 that they caught their first big break when Train's frontman, Pat Monahan, fell sick just prior to the Bite of Las Vegas Festival. Imagine Dragons were called to fill in for them and performed in front of a crowd of more than 26,000 people. In November 2011, they signed with Interscope Records and began working with Grammy award-winning producer Alex da Kid.

Imagine Dragons released their debut studio album Night Visions on September 4, 2012. The album was preceded by their first single "It's Time", released on August 18, 2012. Night Visions charted in the top ten albums in the U.S. in 2012, 2013, and 2014. It won a Billboard Music Award for Top Rock Album and was nominated for a Juno Award for International Album of the Year. The album's second single, "Radioactive", reached No. 3 on the Billboard Hot 100. "Radioactive" set the all-time record for the longest reign at the top of the Billboard Rock Songs chart, with 23 consecutive weeks. It also broke the all-time record for longest run on the Billboard Hot 100, with 87 weeks, a record that would remain unbroken until The Weeknd's smash single "Blinding Lights" charted for an 88th week on the Billboard Hot 100 in August 2021. Rolling Stone called it "the biggest rock hit of the year". It is the best-selling rock song in digital history, with sales of more than 7.5 million copies in the United States, and was certified diamond by the RIAA. The third single, "Demons", reached No. 6 on the Billboard Hot 100 and is the eighth best-selling rock song in digital history with sales in excess of 5 million copies in the United States. Imagine Dragons were nominated for two Grammy Awards, Record of the Year and Best Rock Performance; they won the latter. They also won two AMAs for Favorite Alternative Artist, a Teen Choice Award for Choice Rock Group, a World Music Award for World's Best Rock Act, and a Billboard Music Award for Top Rock Artist. The band made their major festival headlining debut at the Made In America Music Festival in 2014 and also drew large crowds and positive reviews at festivals such as Lollapalooza Brazil in 2014.

Imagine Dragons released their second album, Smoke + Mirrors, in February 2015. Smoke + Mirrors debuted at number one on the Billboard 200, UK Albums Chart, and Canadian Albums Chart. Two of the album's four singles, "I Bet My Life" and "Shots", charted on the Billboard Hot 100.

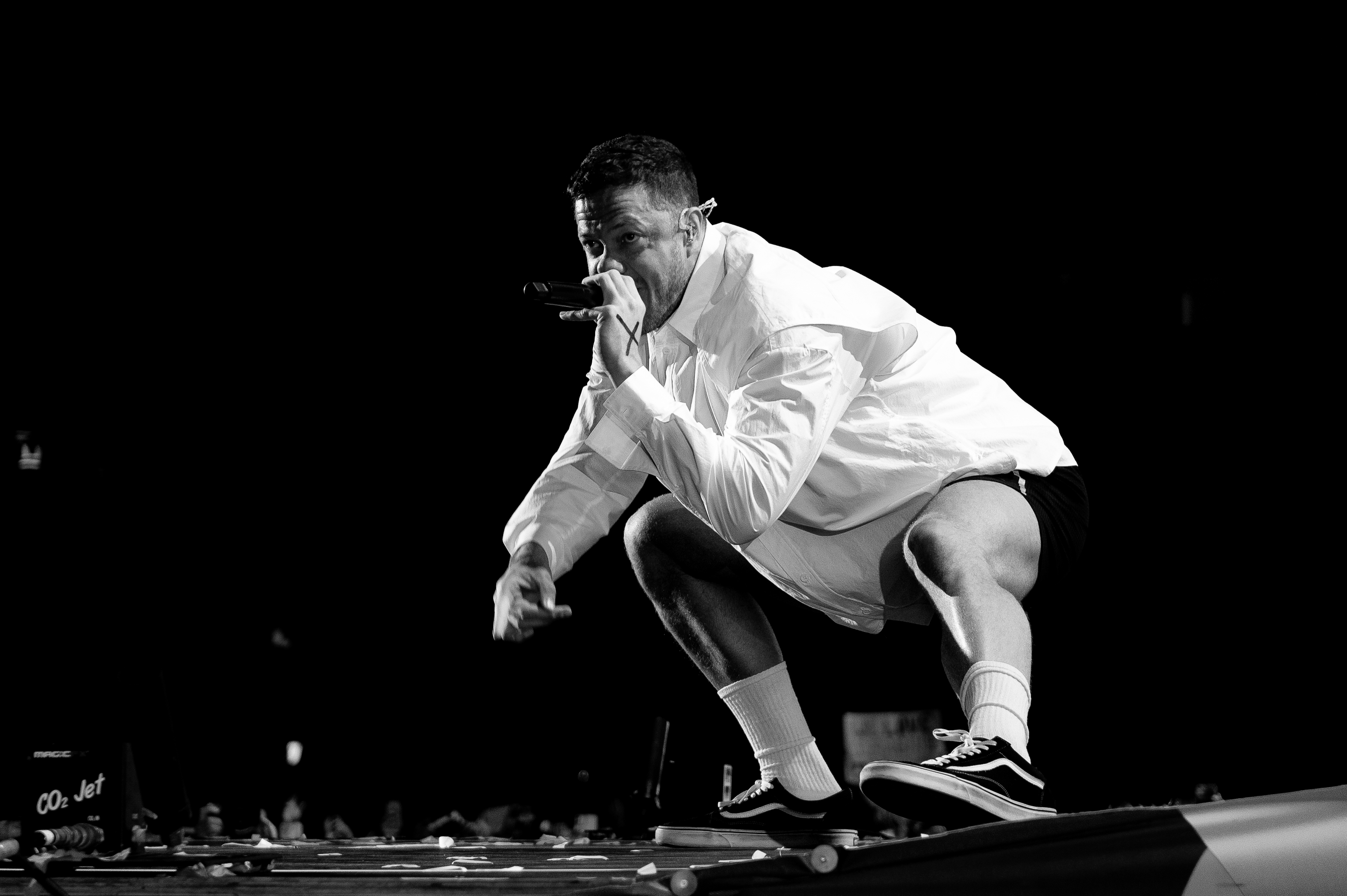
Dan Reynolds performing with Imagine Dragons at Superbloom Festival 2023

Imagine Dragons released their third album Evolve on June 23, 2017. Evolve debuted at No. 2 on the Billboard 200 and No. 1 on the Canadian Albums Chart. Singles "Believer", "Thunder", and "Whatever It Takes", each of which have charted at Nos. 4, 4, and 12 on the Billboard Hot 100, respectively. "Believer" topped the Billboard Hot Rock Songs (29 weeks), Alternative Songs (13 weeks), and Adult Top 40 charts. Thunder also topped the Billboard Hot Rock Songs (22 weeks so far) and Alternative Songs chart (3 weeks so far), as well as the Mainstream Top 40 chart. Whatever It Takes topped the Billboard Rock Songs chart (17 weeks so far) and Alternative Songs chart (3 weeks). In 2018, the band was nominated for two more Grammy Awards and received the iHeartRadio Music Award for Alternative Rock Artists of the Year.

Imagine Dragons released their fourth studio album Origins on November 9, 2018. The album debuted at No. 2 on the Billboard 200. The singles "Natural" and "Bad Liar" peaked at Nos. 13 and 56 on the Billboard Hot 100, respectively.

Imagine Dragons released their fifth studio album Mercury - Act 1 on September 3, 2021. The album debuted at No. 9 on the Billboard 200. The singles "Follow You" and "Enemy" peaked at Nos. 68 and 5 on the Billboard Hot 100, respectively. Mercury - Act 2, the second part of the album, was released on July 1, 2022. The single "Bones" peaked at No. 47 on the Billboard Hot 100.

Imagine Dragons released their sixth studio album Loom on June 28, 2024. The album peaked at No. 22 on the Billboard 200. The lead single "Eyes Closed" peaked at No. 7 on Billboard's Bubbling Under Hot 100 Singles on April 20, 2024.

=== Egyptian (2010) ===
Reynolds was invited to perform an opening set for Nico Vega in 2010, where he met Aja Volkman, the group's lead singer. He asked her to help him finish some demos he was developing. The two began collaborating, and formed Egyptian. They recorded, produced, and independently released a four track eponymous EP digitally. They have only performed this material once live.

=== X Ambassadors (2013) ===
In 2013, Reynolds discovered the unsigned alternative band X Ambassadors. After connecting with the band, he brokered a record deal for them with KidinaKorner/Interscope Records. Reynolds co-wrote a few songs on their debut album VHS, which has gone on to achieve Platinum certification by the RIAA.

=== Night Street Records and Loveloud festival (2016–present) ===
In 2016, Reynolds formed Night Street Records, an imprint label under Interscope Records. His first signing was alternative hip-hop artist K.Flay. Reynolds later signed artist Benson Boone in collaboration with Warner Records in 2021. Both Night Street Records artists have since been nominated for Grammy Awards, and Boone's song "Beautiful Things" went on to become the biggest-selling single in the world in 2024.

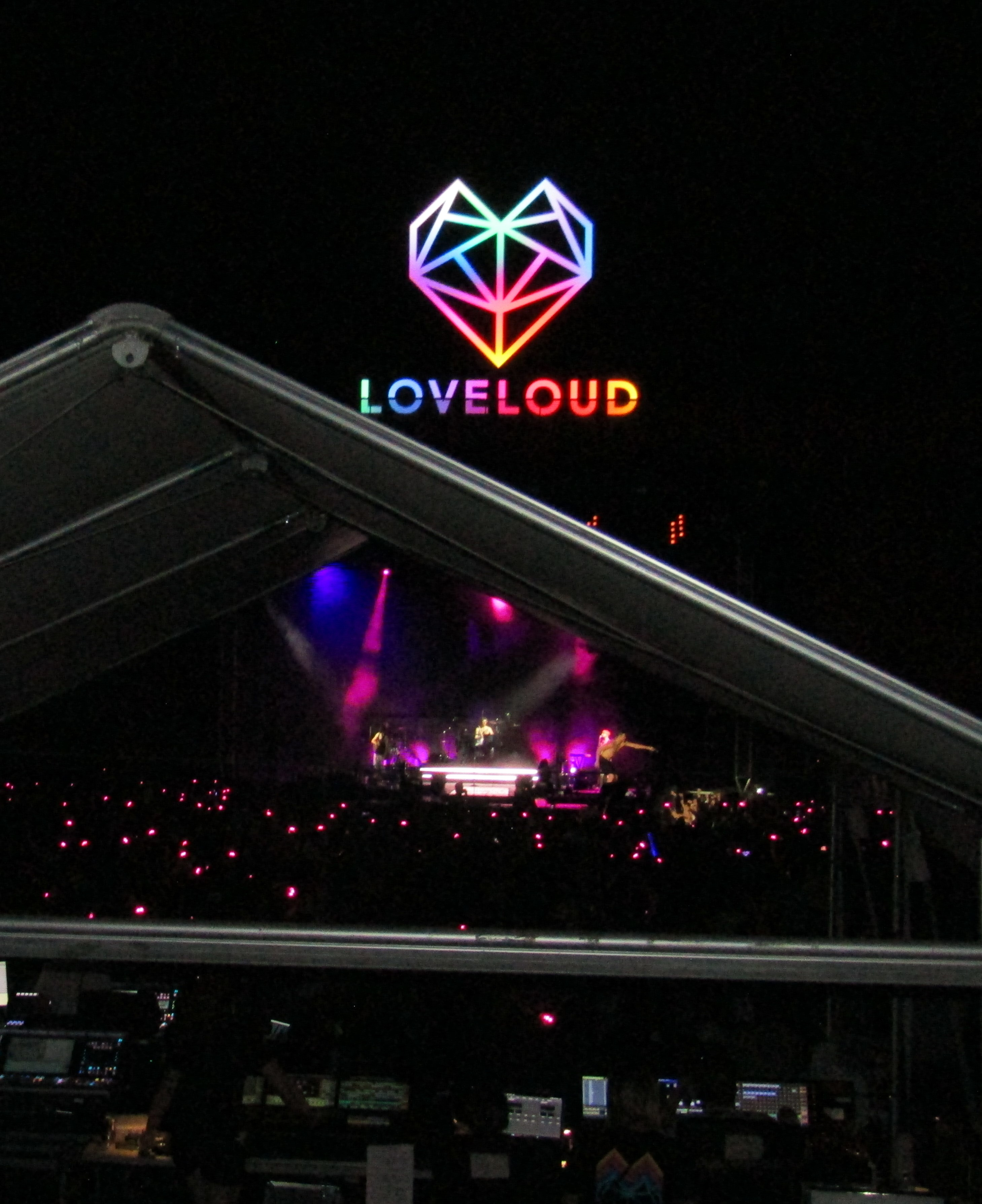
Loveloud Festival in Salt Lake City 2018

He organized the charity festival Loveloud, held August 26, 2017, in Orem, to "fight against teen suicide and to bring communities [...] and encourage acceptance" of LGBTQ youth. The concert donated the profits to LGBTQ organizations The Trevor Project, GLAAD, and others. Performing acts included Imagine Dragons, Neon Trees, Krewella, Joshua James, and Nicholas Petricca (of Walk the Moon). The film Believer, centering on LGBTQ youth suicides in Utah, and the Loveloud concert, premiered at Sundance on January 20, 2018, and on HBO on June 25, 2018.

A second Loveloud festival was held on July 28, 2018, at Rice-Eccles Stadium in Salt Lake City. Acts included Imagine Dragons, Zedd, Mike Shinoda (of Linkin Park), Grace VanderWaal, Tyler Glenn (of Neon Trees), Vagabon, A.W., and Cameron Esposito. An estimated 35,000 people attended the 2018 event and raised approximately a million dollars for the various charities. The event was live streamed for free on YouTube, sponsored by AT&T. During his appearance at the 2018 festival, Utah's Lieutenant Governor Spencer Cox announced Governor Gary Herbert's declaration of July 28, 2018, as "Loveloud Day in Utah".

The third Loveloud festival occurred on June 29, 2019, at USANA Amphitheater in West Valley City. In addition to Reynolds, featured performers included Kesha, Daya, Tegan & Sara, Pvris, and K. Flay. Martin Garrix was also originally booked to perform; however, due to an injury, he was unable to attend the festival. In his absence, indie pop band AJR made an appearance. Former BYU mascot and dancer, Charlie Bird, also performed a choreographed number along with some dancers from the BYU Cougarettes. Other notable speakers included Reynolds' ex-wife Aja Volkman, Shannon Beveridge and X González.

== Influences ==
Reynolds cites Nirvana, Harry Nilsson, The Beatles, Paul Simon, Muse, Coldplay, Arcade Fire, Linkin Park, , and U2 as some of his and the band's artistic influences. He credits bands like Foster the People and Mumford & Sons for bringing alternative music to a new level of commercial success in the 2010s.

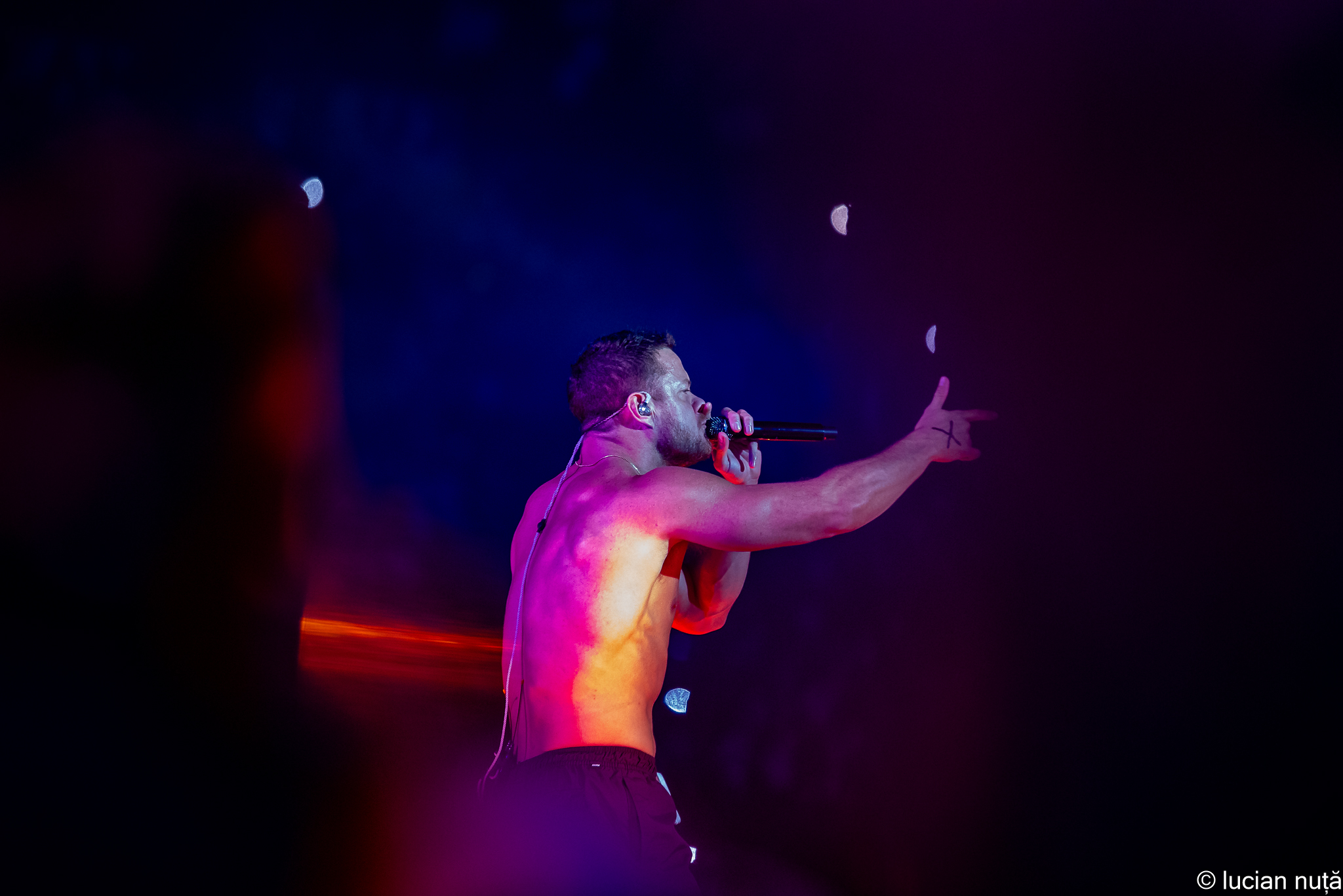
Dan Reynolds performing with Imagine Dragons at Untold Festival in Romania 2023

Reynolds is a classically trained pianist. He learned drums so that he could be good enough to play in his brothers bands growing up. Drums ended up being Reynolds favorite instrument to play, and has played piano and drums onstage for the recent tours of Imagine Dragons. Other instruments he plays are guitar and Tenor saxophone.

Reynolds has often shared that his influences for performing is Freddy Mercury for his onstage presence. One of his favorite artists of all time is Prince, and Reynolds shared that when he sings in falsetto he is naturally inspired by Prince, and brings that vocal tone to his own singing.

=== Songwriting ===
Reynolds credits his love of 90s hip-hop from Tupac, Biggie, Outkast, and Eminem as his music influences for songwriting for the band. He started beatboxing at a young age before playing music and then later used his older brothers microphones to record music on a recording software. In an interview with Howard Stern in 2022, Reynolds stated that everything he writes is influenced by hard hitting percussion and rhythm of 90s hip-hop, and the melody in music he heard growing up from his father's influences which includes Paul Simon, Billy Joel. He wants to hear every word and understand what they're saying. That blend has shaping his songwriting and music for the band.

== Personal life ==
In 2011, Reynolds married Aja Volkman. They have three daughters and a son. Their daughter was born on August 18, 2012, followed by fraternal twin daughters born on March 28, 2017, and a son born on October 1, 2019.

In 2018, Reynolds announced that after just over seven years of being married, he and Volkman would divorce. Later that year, Reynolds stated they never went through with the divorce. On September 16, 2022, Reynolds announced that he and Volkman were again separating. Volkman officially filed for divorce in April 2023. The divorce was finalized on March 2024.

Reynolds has been in a relationship with Minka Kelly since 2022. They were first introduced by a mutual friend and began talking over the phone while Kelly was in the UK for work. Reynolds sent her music he was writing on, and she later returned the favor by sending him her book she had just finished writing. After a month they finally met in person. Reynolds recalls, “I think it helped us both kind of understand each other on a deeper level quite quickly.” Reynolds taught Kelly how to play select songs on piano for the series Ransom Canyon. Reynolds and Kelly later split in October 2026.

Reynolds has ankylosing spondylitis, which he announced during a concert at the First Direct Arena in Leeds in 2015 during the band's Smoke + Mirrors tour. In 2016 he partnered with Novartis's ThisASLife to raise awareness about the severe inflammatory disease. He has also experienced ulcerative colitis since the age of 21.

In 2016, Reynolds said he had been heavily depressed for the past two years and often sees a therapist. Many songs on Night Visions were inspired by his depression. He aims to destigmatize and change how society sees depression and the act of seeking professional help. In April 2018, he began to talk about his physical and mental health struggles on his social media and continues to offer encouraging messages of support to his fans and others struggling as well. He also has spoken of his journey to sobriety.

Reynolds grew up in the LDS Church but has stated he has doctrinal disagreements with the church's stance on LGBTQ+. During a 2021 interview with Attitude he described himself as "non-Mormon"; the following month, he stated "I'm not raising my kids in any religiousness if that means anything. I'm more spiritual based and religion hasn't really been my cup of tea." In 2022, Reynolds confirmed he is no longer Mormon.

Reynolds is a practitioner of Brazilian jiu-jitsu and he competed in the white belt division of a Jiu-Jitsu World League tournament at UCLA on July 2, 2023, winning a bronze medal. As of 2024, Reynolds holds a blue belt in the sport.

== Discography ==
Studio albums

- Night Visions (2012)
- Smoke + Mirrors (2015)
- Evolve (2017)
- Origins (2018)
- Mercury – Act 1 (2021)
- Mercury – Act 2 (2022)
- Loom (2024)

Music
Year	Song(s)	Artist	Album	Role
2011	All tracks	Egyptian	Egyptian - EP	Co-writer, producer, performer
2013	"Stranger"	X Ambassadors	Love Songs Drug Songs	Co-writer, producer
2014	"Tessa"	Various Artists for Transformers: Age of Extinction – The Score	Transformers: Age of Extinction – The Score	Vocals
2014	"Nothing Quite Like Home"	G. Love & Special Sauce featuring Ben Harper	Sugar	Co-writer
2014	"I Believe (Get Over Yourself)" "I'm On Fire"	Nico Vega	Lead to Light	Co-writer, producer
2015	"Fear"	X Ambassadors	VHS	Vocals, co-writer, producer
2016	"Someone Else"	Steve Angello	Wild Youth	Vocals
2016	"Hands"	Various Artists for Orlando	Non-album single	Vocals
2017	"Last Day Alive"	The Chainsmokers featuring Florida Georgia Line	Memories...Do Not Open	Co-writer
2018	"Lyin'"	Bishop Briggs	Church of Scars	Vocals, co-writer
2018	"Skipping Stones"	Dan Reynolds and Hans Zimmer	Non-album single	Vocals, co-writer
2019	"Hustle"	Pink	Hurts 2B Human	Guitar, co-writer, backing vocals
2019	"This Baby Don't Cry"	K.Flay	Solutions	Co-writer
2019	"Original Me"	Yungblud	The Underrated Youth - EP	Vocals, co-writer
2019	"My Own Dance"	Kesha	High Road	Co-writer
2020	"Stand Up"	Tom Morello	Non-album single	Vocals, co-writer
2021	"Good Girl"	K.Flay	Inside Voices / Outside Voices	Co-writer
2023	"Life is Beautiful"	Thirty Seconds to Mars	It's the End of the World but It's a Beautiful Day	Co-writer, composer
2024	"Abyss"	Yungblud	Non-album single	Co-writer

== Filmography ==
Year	Title	Role	Notes
2013	Impractical Jokers	Himself	Season 2, Episode 23: "Enter the Dragons"
2015	A History of Rock	Older Jack	Narrator
2016	Kung Fu Panda 3		Song credit; score includes portions of I'm So Sorry
2016	Me Before You		Song credit; score includes Not Today
2018	Believer	Himself	
2018	Ralph Breaks the Internet	Himself (voice role)	Sings "Zero" during end credits
2020	Hell's Kitchen	Himself	Guest diner; Season 19, Episode 3: "Hell Caesar!"
2021	From Cradle to Stage	Himself	Season 1, Episode 1: "Dan and Christene Reynolds"
2021	Arcane	Himself (voice role)	Season 1, Episode 5: "Everybody Wants to Be My Enemy"; Sings "Enemy" during both the episode and opening of the series.
2023	Imagine Dragons: Live in Vegas	Himself	
2025	Imagine Dragons: Live from the Hollywood Bowl	Himself	
2025	Ransom Canyon	Billy Brinks	Season 1, Episode 9: "About Forever"

== Awards and nominations ==
=== Songwriters Hall of Fame ===
- Hal David Starlight Award (2014)

=== Additional honors ===
- Trevor Hero Award (2017)

== Philanthropy ==
Since 2013, Imagine Dragons along with the family of Tyler Robinson formed and support The Tyler Robinson Foundation, helping young people battling cancer. During the foundation's 2018 annual gala, it raised $2.1 million to support young people battling cancer.

Imagine Dragons have also partnered with Do The Write Thing: National Campaign to Stop Violence (presided over by Reynolds' uncle), Amnesty International's "Bringing Human Rights Home", OneOrlando Fund's "All Is One Orlando Unity Concert", and Crackle's "Playing It Forward" (S1 E2).

In 2015, Imagine Dragons released the track "I Was Me" with all proceeds going to the One4 project to help fleeing refugees, particularly in the Middle East. He also helped organize the Loveloud Fest to benefit LGBTQ organizations.

Imagine Dragons are official ambassadors for the United24 platform, and have raised money for C-type ambulances to provide medical aid in Ukraine. They promoted the United24 platform with their music video for song "Crushed".
