= X Ambassadors discography =

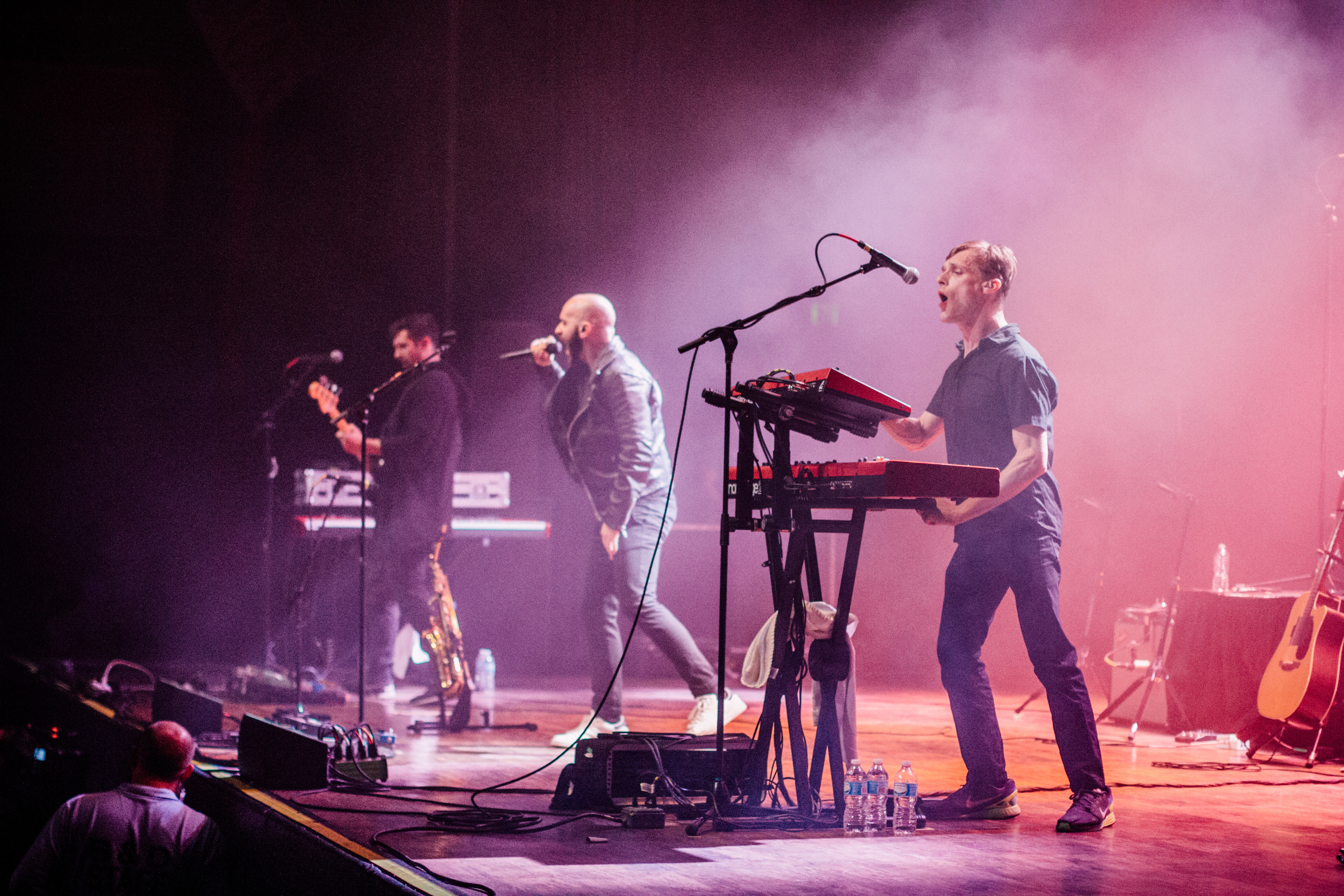
- X Ambassadors performing in December 2015
- Studio albums: 4
- EPs: 6
- Singles: 39

American rock band X Ambassadors has released four studio albums, six extended plays and 39 singles.

== Studio albums ==
Title	Details	Peak chart positions									Certifications
Title	Details	US	US Rock	BEL (FL)	CAN	FRA	GER	LTU	SCO	UK	Certifications
VHS	Released: June 30, 2015; Label: Kidinakorner, Geffen, Interscope; Format: CD, digital download, LP	7	3	181	2	85	56	—	30	41	RIAA: Platinum; MC: 2× Platinum
Orion	Released: June 14, 2019; Label: Kidinakorner, Interscope; Format: CD, digital download	125	25	—	—	—	—	95	—	— (Note: Orion did not enter the UK Albums Chart, but peaked at number 98 on the UK Album Downloads Chart.)	
The Beautiful Liar	Released: September 24, 2021; Label: Kidinakorner, Interscope; Format: CD, digital download	—	—	—	—	—	—	—	—	—	
Townie	Released: April 5, 2024; Label: Nyle; Format: CD, digital download	—	—	—	—	—	—	—	—	— (Note: Townie did not enter the UK Albums Chart, but peaked at number 91 on the UK Album Sales Chart.)	
"—" denotes a recording that did not chart or was not released in that territory.

=== Re-recorded albums ===
Title	Details
VHS(X)	Released: August 29, 2025; Label: Nyle; Format: Digital download, streaming

== Extended plays ==
Title	Details	Peak chart positions	
Title	Details	US Heat	IRE
Ambassadors (Note: "Ambassadors" EP released under the name Ambassadors)	Released: 2009; Label: Ambassadors; Format: Digital download, CD	—	—
Litost (Note: "Litost" EP released under the name Ambassadors)	Released: February 7, 2012; Label: Ambassadors; Format: Digital download, CD	—	—
Love Songs Drug Songs	Released: May 7, 2013; Label: Kidinakorner, Geffen, Interscope; Format: Digital download, CD	11	—
The Reason	Released: January 27, 2014; Label: Kidinakorner, Geffen, Interscope; Format: Digital download, CD	7	62
Belong	Released: March 6, 2020; Label: Kidinakorner, Interscope; Format: Digital download, streaming	—	—
Townies	Released: October 18, 2024; Label: Nyle; Format: Digital download, streaming	—	—
"—" denotes a recording that did not chart or was not released in that territory.

== Singles ==
=== As lead artist ===
Title	Year	Peak chart positions										Certifications	Album
Title	Year	US	AUS	CAN	CZ	FRA	GER	IRE	NL	SWI	UK	Certifications	Album
"Tropisms" (Note: "Tropisms" single released under the name Ambassadors)	2009	—	—	—	—	—	—	—	—	—	—		Ambassadors
"Weight/Lightness" (Note: "Weight/Lightness" single released under the name Ambassadors)	2012	—	—	—	—	—	—	—	—	—	—		Litost
"Unconsolable" (Note: "Unconsolable" single released under the name Ambassadors)	2012	—	—	—	—	—	—	—	—	—	—		Litost
"Unconsolable" (new version)	2013	—	—	—	—	—	—	—	—	—	—		Love Songs Drug Songs
"Jungle" (with Jamie N Commons)	2013	87	— (Note: "Jungle" did not enter the Australian ARIA Singles Chart but peaked at number 13 on the ARIA Hitseekers Chart.)	63	—	55	44	62	85	—	18	RIAA: Platinum; ARIA: Gold; BPI: Silver; MC: Platinum	VHS
"Renegades"	2015	17	43	6	2	10	10	65	32	2	38	RIAA: 4× Platinum; ARIA: Platinum; BPI: Platinum; BVMI: Platinum; FIMI: 4× Platinum; MC: 7× Platinum; SNEP: Gold	VHS
"American Oxygen"	2015	—	—	—	—	—	—	—	—	—	—		Non-album single
"Unsteady"	2015	20	94	61	—	—	—	—	—	77	— (Note: "Unsteady" did not enter the UK Singles Chart, but peaked at number 93 on the UK Singles Downloads Chart.)	RIAA: 5× Platinum; ARIA: Platinum; BPI: Platinum; BVMI: Gold; FIMI: Gold; MC: 5× Platinum	VHS
"Low-Life" (with Jamie N Commons)	2016	—	—	—	—	—	—	—	—	—	—		VHS
"Collider" (with Tom Morello)	2016	—	—	—	—	—	—	—	—	—	—		VHS 2.0
"Hoping"	2017	—	—	—	—	—	—	—	—	—	—		Non-album singles
"Torches"	2017	—	—	—	66	—	—	—	—	—	—		Non-album singles
"The Devil You Know"	2017	—	—	—	—	—	—	—	—	—	—		Non-album singles
"Ahead of Myself"	2017	—	—	— (Note: "Ahead of Myself" did not enter the Billboard Canadian Hot 100, but peaked at number 28 on the Canadian Digital Song Sales chart.)	—	—	—	—	—	—	—		Non-album singles
"Home" (with Machine Gun Kelly and Bebe Rexha)	2017	90	32	43	17	130	27	74	98	39	64	RIAA: Platinum; BPI: Gold	Bright: The Album
"Joyful"	2018	—	—	—	—	—	—	—	—	—	—		Non-album singles
"Don't Stay"	2018	—	—	— (Note: "Don't Stay" did not enter the Billboard Canadian Hot 100, but peaked at number 46 on the Canadian Digital Song Sales chart.)	—	—	—	—	—	—	—		Non-album singles
"Boom"	2019	—	—	—	7	—	—	—	—	—	—	RIAA: Gold	Orion
"Hey Child"	2019	—	—	—	8	—	—	—	—	—	—		Orion
"Hold You Down"	2019	—	—	—	—	—	—	—	—	—	—		Orion
"Optimistic"	2019	—	—	—	—	—	—	—	—	—	—		Non-album single
"Everything Sounds Like a Love Song"	2020	—	—	—	—	—	—	—	—	—	—		Belong
"Belong"	2020	—	—	—	—	—	—	—	—	—	—		Belong
"Great Unknown"	2020	—	—	—	—	—	—	—	—	—	—		The Call of the Wild
"Zen" (with K.Flay and Grandson)	2020	—	—	—	48	—	—	—	—	—	—		Non-album single
"Ultraviolet Tragedies" (with Terrell Hines)	2021	—	—	—	—	—	—	—	—	—	—		(Eg)
"Skip That Party" (with Jensen McRae)	2021	—	—	—	—	—	—	—	—	—	—		(Eg)
"Blinding Lights"	2021	—	—	—	—	—	—	—	—	—	—		Non-album single
"Torture" (with Earl St. Clair)	2021	—	—	—	—	—	—	—	—	—	—		(Eg)
"My Own Monster"	2021	—	—	—	8	—	—	—	—	—	—		The Beautiful Liar
"Okay"	2021	—	—	—	—	—	—	—	—	—	—		The Beautiful Liar
"Adrenaline"	2021	—	—	—	—	—	—	—	—	—	—		The Beautiful Liar
"Beautiful Liar"	2021	—	—	—	—	—	—	—	—	—	—		The Beautiful Liar
"Water"	2021	—	—	—	—	—	—	—	—	—	—		Blade Runner: Black Lotus
"Back to You" (with Lost Frequencies and Elley Duhé)	2022	—	—	—	8	—	32	—	3	32	—	IFPI SWI: Platinum	All Stand Together
"Happy People" (with Teddy Swims and Jac Ross)	2023	—	—	—	—	—	—	—	—	—	—		(Eg) Season 2
"Friend for Life" (with Medium Build)	2023	—	—	—	50	—	—	—	—	—	—		(Eg) Season 2
"Devastation" (with Pamé)	2023	—	—	—	—	—	—	—	—	—	—		(Eg) Season 2
"Alcohol" (with Breland)	2023	—	—	—	—	—	—	—	—	—	—		(Eg) Season 2
"Deep End"	2023	—	—	—	—	—	—	—	—	—	—		Aquaman and the Lost Kingdom
"No Strings"	2024	—	—	—	—	—	—	—	—	—	—		Townie
"Your Town"	2024	—	—	—	—	—	—	—	—	—	—		Townie
"Half-Life"	2024	—	—	—	—	—	—	—	—	—	—		Townie
"Follow the Sound of My Voice"	2024	—	—	—	—	—	—	—	—	—	—		Townie
"Fragile"	2024	—	—	—	—	—	—	—	—	—	—		Townies
"Y.O.T.H."	2026	—	—	—	—	—	—	—	—	—	—		TBA
"—" denotes a recording that did not chart or was not released in that territory.

=== As featured artist ===
Title	Year	Peak chart positions										Certifications	Album
Title	Year	US	AUS	CAN	CZ	FRA	GER	IRE	NL	SWI	UK	Certifications	Album
"Love of a Life" (Keljet featuring X Ambassadors)	2013	—	—	—	—	—	—	—	—	—	—		Non-album singles
"Cannonball" (Skylar Grey featuring X Ambassadors)	2015	—	—	—	—	—	—	—	—	—	—		Non-album singles
"Sucker for Pain" (Lil Wayne, Wiz Khalifa and Imagine Dragons with Logic and Ty Dolla $ign featuring X Ambassadors)	2016	15	7	19	4	18	8	18	18	16	11	RIAA: 3× Platinum; ARIA: Platinum; BPI: Gold; BVMI: Platinum; FIMI: 2× Platinum; IFPI SWI: Gold; SNEP: Platinum	Suicide Squad: The Album
"Heat" (The Knocks featuring Sam Nelson Harris)	2016	—	—	—	—	—	—	—	—	—	—		Testify
"Not Easy" (Alex Da Kid featuring X Ambassadors, Elle King and Wiz Khalifa)	2016	— (Note: "Not Easy" did not enter the Billboard Hot 100, but peaked at number 36 on the Digital Song Sales chart.)	73	—	31	—	—	—	—	—	—		Non-album single
"Cycles" (Methal featuring X Ambassadors)	2017	—	—	—	—	—	—	—	—	—	—		I'm with the Banned
"Razor's Edge" (Masked Wolf featuring X Ambassadors)	2021	—	—	—	—	—	—	—	—	—	—		Astronomical
"Undeniable" (Kygo featuring X Ambassadors)	2021	—	—	—	—	—	—	79	— (Note: "Undeniable" did not enter the Netherlands' Single Top 100 but peaked on the Netherlands' Single Tip Chart at number 11.)	55	—		Thrill of the Chase
"—" denotes a recording that did not chart or was not released in that territory.

== Other charting songs ==
Title	Year	Peak chart positions										Album
Title	Year	US Bub.	AUS	CAN	FRA	GER	IRE	NL	SCO	SWE	UK	Album
"Wicked Ways" (Eminem featuring X Ambassadors)	2013	—	—	—	—	—	—	—	—	—	197	The Marshall Mathers LP 2
"Bad Husband" (Eminem featuring X Ambassadors)	2017	15	94	68	167	69	44	81	99	70	— (Note: "Bad Husband" did not enter the UK Singles Chart, but peaked at number 99 on the UK Singles Downloads Chart.)	Revival
"—" denotes a recording that did not chart or was not released in that territory.

== Guest appearances ==
Title	Year	Other artist(s)	Album
"Wicked Ways"	2013	Eminem	The Marshall Mathers LP 2
"Comfortable"	2014	The Knocks	55
"Transmission"	2015	Zedd, Logic	True Colors
"Bad Husband"	2017	Eminem	Revival
"Baptize Me"	2019	Jacob Banks	For the Throne: Music Inspired by the HBO Series Game of Thrones
"In Your Arms"	2019	Illenium	Ascend
"You'll Get Yours"	2021	Tom Morello	The Atlas Underground Flood
"Helium"	2025	G-Eazy	Helium

== Music videos ==
Title	Year	Director(s)
"Tropisms"	2009	Jackson Morton
"Unconsolable"	2013	ENDS
"Jungle"	2014	Emile Rafael and Alex Da Kid
"Renegades"	2015	ENDS and Alex Da Kid
"Unsteady"	2015	ENDS
"American Oxygen"	2016	ENDS
"Low Life"	2016	Alissa Torvinen
"Collider"	2016	Tess Harrison
"Hoping"	2017	Stephanie Rheingold
"Ahead of Myself"	2017	Jake Kovnat
"Joyful"	2018	Tess Harrison
"Don't Stay"	2018	Tess Harrison
"Boom"	2019	Tess Harrison
"Hold You Down"	2019	Najeeb Tarazi
"Hey Child"	2019	Sam Nelson Harris
"Everything Sounds Like a Love Song"	2020	Sam Nelson Harris
"Belong"	2020	Anna Lee
"My Own Monster"	2021	Daniel Iglesias Jr.
"Adrenaline"	2021	Daniel Iglesias Jr.
"Beautiful Liar"	2021	Boris Zaiontchkovsky
"Back to You"	2022	Timo Ottevanger
"No Strings"	2024	Daniel Fermín Pfeffer and Carlos Cardona
"Your Town"	2024	Daniel Fermín Pfeffer
"Half-Life"	2024	Louis Celano and Jake Basser
