= Cannonball (Skylar Grey song) =

Single by Skylar Grey featuring X Ambassadors
- Released: September 25, 2015
- Recorded: 2015
- Genre: Folk pop
- Length: 3:56
- Songwriters: Holly Hafermann; Alexander Grant; X Ambassadors

Skylar Grey singles chronology
"Bed of Lies" (2014)	"Cannonball" (2015)	"Moving Mountains" (2016)

X Ambassadors singles chronology
"American Oxygen" (2015)	"Cannonball" (2015)	"Unsteady" (2015)

Cannonball is a single released by American singer and songwriter Skylar Grey. The song was written by Grey, Sam Harris, Noah Feldshuh, Casey Harris, Adam Levin and Alex da Kid, produced by the latter, and features the band X Ambassadors. "Cannonball" is on FIFA 16 soundtrack, and was announced by The Independent. It received official digital release on September 25, 2015 "Cannonball" will support the US collaborative tour between Grey and X Ambassadors. The song sold around 25,000 digital copies in the United States.

== Background ==
Grey released her debut album under her new name in 2013, after almost 3 years of promotion. Between the end of the album promotion and the releasing of "Cannonball", Skylar worked with artists David Guetta, Nicki Minaj and Eminem. She has also worked on the soundtracks for Fifty Shades of Grey to Furious 7.

== Critical reception ==
The song was well received by the music critics. Robbie Daw from Idolator described the song as a "moody little guitar-driven number", and called it an "appropriate fit" for the musician. Nick Walter from 103.3 the App, like many other sites, spotted some similarities to Ambassadors' own hit single Renegades, which were mainly the harmonies and acoustic guitars brought by them, giving some kind of folkness to the song. Ameristream site also stated that Grey's song is the "kissing cousin" of the band's, but in a good way.

== Commercial performance ==
Since its release, the song has reached the top 50 on American iTunes, and No. 3 at alternative iTunes charts. "Cannonball" has also peaked at No. 5 on iTunes in Fiji and inside the top 90 of Canadian iTunes. The audio has over 1,543,000 plays on VEVO and over 4,232,000 on Spotify to date.

== Music video ==
The accompanying music video was directed by Daniel Carberry, also responsible by G.R.L.'s "Lighthouse". It was released on October 5 on Vevo. It shows Skylar Grey fighting against olympian medalist Tony Jeffries. As of June 19, the video reached over 1,634,000 views.

== Track listing ==
- Digital download
1. "Cannonball" – 3:53
- CD Single
1. "Cannonball"
2. "Closer"

== Charts ==
Chart (2015)	Peak position
US Alternative Digital Songs (Billboard)	6
US Pop Digital Songs (Billboard)	27
