= Ahead of Myself =

Single by X Ambassadors
- Released: July 21, 2017
- Recorded: 2017
- Genre: Alternative rock; electronic rock; pop rock
- Length: 3:43
- Label: KIDinaKORNER; Interscope
- Songwriters: Casey Harris; Sam Harris; Scott Harris; Adam Levin

X Ambassadors singles chronology
"The Devil You Know" (2017)	"Ahead of Myself" (2017)	"Home" (2017)

Music video
- "Ahead of Myself" on YouTube

"Ahead of Myself" is a song recorded by American rock band X Ambassadors. It was released as a single on July 21, 2017 by KIDinaKORNER and Interscope.

== Composition ==
Neon music described "Ahead of Myself" as "a glittering synth-rock masterpiece which starts off with tender acoustic guitar, a toe-tapping rhythm and soft vocals, but then leads to pulsating drums, swooping vocals and a dynamic chorus." The song was written by X Ambassadors in collaboration with Scott Harris.

In an interview with The Cornell Daily Sun, X Ambassadors frontman Sam Harris said the song "is a little bit of a bridge between the two worlds of VHS, the last record, and this new sound [of the upcoming album]. Something that has an alternative feel to it but also soul and is lyrically intimate and revealing." When asked about his inspirations behind the lyrics, Harris told Billboard magazine, "I have definitely had times in my life in relationships where I dove in too early before I really wasn't ready to commit to somebody. I messed things up there. There have also been times in my life where I have put my trust in someone else too early before they really were deserving of my trust. [...] This was a year and a half of a lot of transition, a lot of really emotional loss and gain."

== Music video ==
The official music video for the song was premiered during a live acoustic set on September 7, 2017 at The Microsoft Lounge in Venice, Los Angeles. The clip was officially released on September 14. Directed by Jake Kovnat, it was filmed on the streets of Rochester, New York.

Speaking about the clip in a Billboard interview, Sam Harris stated, "The video [...] is a very simple concept. We've done the narrative film structure of the music video. We've done full-on big performance video with lights and stuff and we wanted to do something that felt really intimate and real, authentic, so we shot this video in upstate New York, in Rochester. [...] But the concept of it is we wanted to do a live vocal take, so we wanted me actually singing instead of lip syncing to create something that felt intimate, that felt real and vulnerable and in the moment. I had to prepare for like a week".

The video ends with Harris heading into a theater where a snippet of what would later become the single "Joyful" could be heard.

== Live performances ==
X Ambassadors performed the song on Late Night with Seth Meyers on July 20, 2017, one day before the single was released.

== Charts ==
=== Weekly charts ===
Chart (2017–18)	Peak position
US Adult Pop Airplay (Billboard)	13
US Adult Alternative Airplay (Billboard)	8
US Alternative Airplay (Billboard)	12
US Hot Rock & Alternative Songs (Billboard)	24
US Rock & Alternative Airplay (Billboard)	15

=== Year-end charts ===
Chart (2017)	Position
US Hot Rock Songs (Billboard)	82
US Alternative Songs (Billboard)	40
Chart (2018)	Position
US Adult Top 40 (Billboard)	38
