= Rumble and Sway =

Rumble and Sway EP

EP by Jamie N Commons
- Released: 12 March 2013
- Genre: Rock
- Length: 19:01
- Label: Interscope
- Producer: Alex da Kid

Jamie N Commons chronology
The Baron (2011)	Rumble and Sway EP (2013)	Jamie N Commons (2016)

Professional ratings
Review scores
Source	Rating
AllMusic	3.5/5 stars

Rumble and Sway is the second EP by Jamie N Commons. The title song was used in the trailer for the 2016 Coen brothers film, Hail, Caesar!, season 3 of American supernatural teen drama television series Teen Wolf, season 3 of American legal drama television series Suits and the movie Monster Trucks (film) as well as making appearances in commercials for Levi's in 2014 and for Butterfinger in 2020. Steve Leggett writes in his AllMusic review that "Commons is on his way somewhere, and if Rumble and Sway feels like a transitional affair, it also feels like a good transition, pointing to the possibility of a masterpiece just around the bend."

== Track listing ==
No.	Title	Writer(s)	Length
1.	"Rumble And Sway"	Jamie N Commons; Jayson DeZuzio; Alexander Grant	3:05
2.	"Wash Me In The Water"	Jamie N Commons; Kid Harpoon	3:35
3.	"Worth Your While"	Jamie N Commons; Francis White	2:55
4.	"Have A Little Faith"	John Hiatt	2:22
5.	"Caroline (Early Demo)"	Jamie N Commons	3:24
6.	"The Preacher"	Jamie N Commons	3:40
Total length:			19:01

== Musicians ==
- Jamie N Commons: Guitar, Vocals, Percussion, Background Vocals
- C.C. Adcock: Guitar
- Rhiannon Armstrong: Violin
- Gillian Bradtke: Violin
- J Browz: Guitar
- Ben Castle: Baritone Saxophone, Tenor Saxophone
- Jon Cleary: Piano
- Nicole Robson: Cello
- Eg White: Drums, Guitar, Producer, Synthesizer, Background Vocals
- Gus Collins: Percussion, Piano, Background Vocals
- George Cook: Drums, Percussion, Background Vocals
- James Dee: Bass, Background Vocals
- Jonno Frishberg: Fiddle
- Susie Gillis: Double Bass, Violin
- Mike Glozier: Drums
- Charlie Stock: Viola
- M.J. Nunez: Slide Guitar
- Chris Storr: Trumpet
- Ed Harcourt: Pump Organ, Background Vocals
- Kid Harpoon: Background Vocals
- Benjamin Markham: Guitar, Percussion, Background Vocals
- Jolynda Robinson: Background Vocals
- Yolanda Robinson: Background Vocals

== Production ==
- Alex da Kid: Producer, Executive Producer
- Mark Bishop: Engineer
- Jamie N Commons: Producer, Engineer
- Jayson DeZuzio: Producer
- Steve Gullick: Photography
- Ed Harcourt: Producer
- Eliot James: Producer, Engineer, Mixing
- Joe LaPorta: Mastering
- Darren Lawson: Engineer
- Benjamin Markham: Producer
- Josh Mosser: Engineer
- Hugh Worskett: Mixing, Producer
- Eg White: Engineer
- Manny Marroquin: Mixing
- Steve Stacey: Art Direction, Design

All track information and credits were taken from the CD liner notes.
