= The Reason (EP) =

EP by X Ambassadors
- Released: January 27, 2014
- Genre: Alternative rock; indie rock; electropop
- Length: 22:24
- Label: Geffen; Interscope; KIDinaKORNER

X Ambassadors chronology
Love Songs Drug Songs (2013)	The Reason (2014)	VHS (2015)

Singles from The Reason
- 1. "Jungle" Released: December 18, 2013

The Reason is the fourth EP by American rock band X Ambassadors, released on January 27, 2014. It follows the band's previous EP, Love Songs Drug Songs and spawned the single "Jungle" and also includes the track "Unsteady", both of which were included on the band's debut album, VHS.

== Composition ==
Musically, The Reason has been described as an album with elements of trap music and indie pop, with "a country vibe to it". X Ambassadors member Sam Harris cited rock singer Bruce Springsteen as a big influence on the album.

In an interview with The Emory Wheel, the band commented on their inspirations: "We've always tried to write songs for anyone who feels marginalized, underrepresented: [people] who feel like they're different or are unable to speak up for themselves. A lot of the songs off of VHS and our previous EP, The Reason, were written with that in mind." According to Craig D. Lindsey of The News & Observer, the running theme through the EP is Sam Harris' struggling with self-doubt.

On January 30, 2014, X Ambassadors posted a message on their Facebook account about the goal of the EP. They stated that The Reason is their attempt to tell a story "about someone who gave up chasing a dream and who had the courage to start over."

== Promotion and release ==
On January 23, 2014, the band released a three-minute preview of the upcoming EP.

== Critical reception ==
Jeffrey Howard of Campus Times described it as a "pretty interesting" album. Tina Roumeliotis of Buzznet wrote a positive review about the EP, stating "[t]he bravery runs rampant in this release and it has me quite inspired".

== Track listing ==
All songs composed by X Ambassadors.

The Reason track listing
No.	Title	Length
1.	"Free & Lonely"	4:08
2.	"The Business"	4:20
3.	"Giants"	3:57
4.	"Unsteady"	3:12
5.	"Shining"	3:38
6.	"Jungle" (with Jamie N Commons)	3:09
Total length:		22:24

Digital re-release 2015
No.	Title	Length
1.	"Free & Lonely"	4:08
2.	"The Business"	4:20
3.	"Giants"	3:57
4.	"Shining"	3:38
Total length:		16:03

== Charts ==
Chart (2014)	Peak position
US Heatseekers Albums (Billboard)	7
