= Zen (X Ambassadors, K.Flay, and Grandson song) =

2020 song by X Ambassadors, K.Flay, and Grandson

Single by X Ambassadors, K.Flay, and Grandson
- Released: May 15, 2020
- Genre: Indie rock • rap rock • pop rock
- Length: 3:35
- Label: Kidinakorner; Interscope
- Songwriters: Sam Harris; Casey Harris; Adam Levin; Kristine Flaherty; Jordan Benjamin
- Producer: X Ambassadors

X Ambassadors singles chronology
"Great Unknown" (2020)	"Zen" (2020)	"Razor's Edge" (2021)

K.Flay singles chronology
"Peaches (Text Voter XX to 40649)" (2020)	"Zen" (2020)	"So Slow" (2020)

Grandson singles chronology
"How Bout Now (Text Voter XX to 40649)" (2020)	"Zen" (2020)	"Again (Text Voter XX to 40649)" (2020)

Music video
- "Zen" on YouTube

"Zen" is a song by American pop rock band X Ambassadors, American singer and rapper K.Flay, and American-Canadian fellow singer and rapper Grandson. It was released on May 15, 2020, through Kidinakorner and Interscope Records. The song was written soon after the beginning of COVID-19 lockdowns in March 2020 and deals with mental health during quarantine.

The song was played live for the first time on June 15, 2024, on X Ambassadors' Townie Tour in Los Angeles.

== Background and composition ==
"Zen" was written by X Ambassadors, K.Flay, and Grandson entirely remotely. The artists were brought together through previous collaborations and decided to create a song after talking about their struggles during quarantine. The song itself deals with these topics of loneliness and a wish for a return to what was previously considered normal. The song ends by abruptly stopping the chorus and ending with zen-like music. X Ambassadors lead singer Sam Harris described the overall message of the song in a statement:

We wanted to talk about what stresses us out. What we wish we understood better. What we think no one else understands. We talk about finding peace in chaos. And finding chaos in…well, everything.

— Sam Harris

== Promotion ==
The song was first teased for the first time in an Instagram Live on May 7. The next week saw each artist post a photo of their face with cucumber slices on their eyes, as seen in the cover art, with the word "Zen" repeated behind them. On May 12, X Ambassadors posted a phone number which when called would play a woman asking if the listener needs some "zen". She also prompted callers to text the number in a chance to join a Zoom call with all the artists.

Following the song's release, the hashtag #zenchallenge was created to encourage people during their quarantine to focus on mental health, mindfulness, and gratefulness and also promote activist groups like Black Lives Matter.

== Music video ==
The video for the song was released May 15, 2020 and was directed by K.Flay and Evgenia Strukova and produced by Dmitry Tokoyakov and the company Green Light. The video is in a collage-like style and describes each artists' quirks and anxieties from being in lockdowns. This leads to all three singing and dancing to the last chorus of the song on camera.

== Personnel ==
Credits for "Zen" adapted from Apple Music.

Musicians
- Sam Harris – lead vocals
- K.Flay – lead vocals
- Grandson – lead vocals
- Casey Harris – keyboards
- Adam Levin – drums
Production
- X Ambassadors – production
- Michael Freeman – mixing
- Daniel Stringer – engineering

== Charts ==
Chart performance for "Zen"
Chart (2023)	Peak position
Czech Republic Airplay (ČNS IFPI)	48
Canada Rock (Billboard)	72
US Alternative Airplay (Billboard)	24
