= Jungle (X Ambassadors and Jamie N Commons song) =

Single by X Ambassadors and Jamie N Commons

from the album VHS and the EP The Reason
- Released: 18 December 2013
- Genre: Alternative rock; electronic rock; indie rock; arena rock
- Length: 3:09
- Label: KIDinaKORNER; Interscope
- Songwriters: X Ambassadors; Jamie N Commons; Alex da Kid; Mike Del Rio
- Producer: Alex da Kid: Mike Del Rio

X Ambassadors singles chronology
"Unconsolable" (2013)	"Jungle" (2013)	"Renegades" (2015)

Jamie N Commons singles chronology
"Rumble and Sway" (2013)	"Jungle" (2013)	"Immigrant Song" (2014)

Music video
- "Jungle" on YouTube

"Jungle" is a song by American rock band X Ambassadors and British blues rock singer Jamie N Commons. It was released as a single on 18 December 2013 by KIDinaKORNER and Interscope. The track appeared on X Ambassadors' 2014 EP The Reason and their 2015 studio album VHS.

== Composition ==
"Jungle" has been described as an "amped up" alternative rock and electronic song, as well as a "rock-heavy, upbeat track". The song features "a drum-beat reminiscent of Queen's 'We Will Rock You'". Jeff Benjamin of Fuse compared it to an Imagine Dragons track, stating it "is full of Alex [da Kid]'s booming electronic-rock percussion, but with soulful humming and bluesy belting in place of Dragons singer Dan Reynolds' signature shouty approach." "Jungle" was co-written by X Ambassadors, Jamie N Commons, Alex da Kid and Mike Del Rio. Alex da Kid and Mike Del Rio also produced the song.

Speaking about the goal of the song in a Billboard interview, Alex da Kid stated, "It was my goal to write and produce an anthemic song that would resonate with anyone that has grown up in or been around underprivileged surroundings." In an interview with The News & Observer, X Ambassadors member Sam Harris commented on the writing process: "I had written a hook for it, and Alex had the beat. I thought he was gonna put a rapper on it, but then he gave it to Jamie, and Jamie wrote these great verses on it." According to Sam Harris, the negative experiences that his brother and bandmate Casey Harris had encountered as a blind person after relocating to New York City served as an inspiration for the song.

== Release and reception ==
"Jungle" was made available for digital download on 18 December 2013 by KIDinaKORNER and Interscope Records.

Jason Warshof of Ithaca.com described the song as a "thumping, gritted-teeth anthem". Harlew Brown of Spin called it "a soulful heavy hitter". Andy Gensler of Billboard regarded it as a "pounding, foot-stomping blues beat", noting that it sounds like "John Bonham with a shotgun, holding up a guttural-sounding blues vocal."

== Music video ==
The official music video for the song was exclusively premiered on 16 June 2014 on the website of Billboard magazine. It was co-directed by Emile Rafael and Alex da Kid. The video features members of various subcultures in Los Angeles. AXS contributor William Pankey described it as "a fly-covered, grubby slice of life centered around the piss-stained, impoverished streets of Los Angeles."

== Live performances ==
X Ambassadors and Jamie N Commons included the song on the setlist for their Into the Jungle U.S. Tour, which lasted from 30 September to 18 October 2014. On 31 January 2017, X Ambassadors performed "Jungle" alongside "Collider" at the Opening Night celebration of Super Bowl LI at Minute Maid Park, Houston.

== Remixes ==
=== Jay-Z remix ===
On 14 June 2014, a remix version featuring a rap segment by American rapper Jay-Z debuted during Game 5 of the NBA Finals between Miami Heat and San Antonio Spurs. On the same day, the remix was made available exclusively on Beats Music, before it was released as a single for digital download on 23 June. The remix was commissioned as part of an advertising campaign by Beats Electronics for the 2014 FIFA World Cup.

In a VH1 interview, X Ambassadors singer Sam Harris commented on the background of the remix version: "Our producer calls me up out of the blue. He's like, 'Hey, guess what? I got Jay-Z to do a remix of "Jungle"!' Came out of nowhere." One of the interludes on X Ambassadors' album VHS, titled "Good News on the Remix", features a recording of the conversation between Sam Harris and the producer discussing Jay-Z's remix. The lyrics of the additional verse contain references to Brazilian favelas, religious persecution, Muhammad Ali as well as several films, including A Bronx Tale (1993), Training Day (2001) and City of God (2002).

Colin Stutz of Billboard stated that while the remix "isn't much different from the original", Jay-Z "gets his point across, going nonstop for more than a minute straight", with "a heavy hitting verse". According to Colin Joyce of Spin, the rapper "manages to transform the bombastic single into [a] stadium-sized banger".

== Usage in media ==
The song was used as the official theme for WWE Battleground in 2014 and in the emd credits of Hitman: Agent 47 in 2015.

"Jungle" was used in a five-minute promotional video titled "The Game Before the Game" by Beats Electronics, released in June 2014 for the FIFA World Cup and intended to promote Beats by Dre's redesigned Solo2 headphones. Directed by Nabil Elderkin, the advertisement features, among others, Neymar, Cesc Fàbregas, Luis Suárez, Nicki Minaj, Lil Wayne, LeBron James and Serena Williams. Speaking about the selection of "Jungle" for the campaign, Beats by Dre's chief marketing officer Omar Johnson told Billboard magazine, "We had a really huge track from a really huge artist. The moment we heard this song, we literally said 'nope, that's the right song.'" Billboard placed the track at number three in its list of the Top 10 Songs From World Cup Spots.

The song was featured in a trailer for the second season of Netflix web television series Orange Is the New Black. It was also used in trailers for the films Horrible Bosses 2 (2014) and Project Almanac (2015) and the video game Battlefield Hardline (2015). It appeared in the crime thriller television series The Blacklist.

In April 2015, a promotional video featuring the cast of Pitch Perfect 2 and basketball player Kyle Lowry was released for the 2015 NBA Playoffs. The video featured an a cappella cover version of the track, with Anna Kendrick performing as lead vocalist. "Jungle" also appeared in a television commercial for the video game Deus Ex: Mankind Divided (2016). A remix version of the song by Steve Aoki was used in a launch trailer for the video game Injustice 2 (2017). The song was included on the soundtrack of the basketball simulation video game NBA 2K18 (2017). The song was used in the latest spot of Ahora Noticias, a Chilean news network on Channel Mega. The song was also used in the E3 2018 reveal trailer and part of the official soundtrack of the association football game Pro Evolution Soccer 2019 (2018). A cover of the song by BTS was used in a January 2021 advertisement of Coca-Cola in Indonesia.

== Controversy ==
On 25 November 2016, a copyright lawsuit was filed by Songs Music Publishing, LLC in the United States District Court for the Middle District of Tennessee against German automobile manufacturer Porsche and the Cramer-Krasselt advertising agency which alleged that one of the company's advertisements for the sports car Porsche 718 Cayman "copies several quantitatively and qualitatively important portions of 'Jungle'". According to the complaint, the defendants copied the original drum rhythms, organ stabs and background vocals from the song, which together "negates any suggestion of independent creation".

== Track listing ==
- Digital download
1. "Jungle" – 3:09
- Digital download – remix
1. "Jungle" (Remix) (feat. Jay-Z) – 3:27
- Digital download – Remixes
1. "Jungle" (Great Good Fine OK Remix) – 3:06
2. "Jungle" (KDrew Remix Edited) – 3:12
3. "Jungle" (KDrew Remix Extended) – 3:43
- Digital download – The MADE Edit
1. "Jungle" (The MADE Edit) – 4:34

== Charts and certifications ==
=== Weekly charts ===
Chart (2014)	Peak position
Canada Hot 100 (Billboard)	63
France (SNEP)	55
Germany (GfK)	44
Ireland (IRMA)	62
Netherlands (Single Top 100)	85
Scottish Singles Sales (Official Charts)	12
UK Singles (Official Charts)	18
US Billboard Hot 100	87
US Hot Rock & Alternative Songs (Billboard)	10

=== Certifications and sales ===
Region	Certification	Certified units/sales
Australia (ARIA)	Gold	35,000^{‡}
Canada (Music Canada)	Platinum	80,000^{‡}
New Zealand (RMNZ)	Gold	15,000^{‡}
United Kingdom (BPI)	Silver	200,000^{‡}
United States (RIAA)	Platinum	1,000,000^{‡}
^{‡} Sales+streaming figures based on certification alone.
