= The Beautiful Liar (album) =

2021 studio album by X Ambassadors

Studio album by X Ambassadors
- Released: September 24, 2021
- Length: 36:03
- Label: KidinaKorner; Interscope
- Producer: Alex da Kid; X Ambassadors

X Ambassadors chronology
Belong (2020)	The Beautiful Liar (2021)	Townie (2024)

Singles from The Beautiful Liar
- 1. "My Own Monster" Released: June 11, 2021; 2. "Okay" Released: July 30, 2021; 3. "Adrenaline" Released: August 13, 2021; 4. "Beautiful Liar" Released: September 24, 2021

The Beautiful Liar is the third studio album by American rock band X Ambassadors. It was released on September 24, 2021 by Kidinakorner and Interscope Records. The album follows X Ambassadors' second album, Orion (2019) and the band's EP Belong (2020). It is a concept album, playing similarly to a radio drama.

== Background ==
Their multi-collaborative series (Eg) and Belong EP were material largely recorded weeks before the lockdowns as a result of the COVID-19 pandemic. All three band members wrote and composed the album's tracks virtually, starting with what they had before the lockdown and expanding upon it.

It expresses themes of insanity, powerlessness, self-doubt, and anxiety. Lead singer Sam and keyboardist Casey Harris say the album was influenced by the radio shows they would listen to as children instead of TV because of Casey's blindness. Sam said "I wanted to make an album that felt as unhinged as I did, and as the whole world felt around me. So Adam [Levin], Casey and I carved ourselves a space where we could all be as ugly, weird, funny, and f'd up as we wanted to be."

== Critical reception ==
Professional ratings
Review scores
Source	Rating
AllMusic	4/5 stars
Melodic	4/5 stars

The Beautiful Liar received generally positive reviews from critics. Matt Collar of AllMusic gave the album a 4 out of 5 stars and wrote that "The Beautiful Liar is a quirky, oddly intriguing experience, whose conceptual elements interrupt the corporate pop flow of the album". He praised the songs "My Own Monster", "Love Is Death", and "Reincarnated". Johan Wippsson from Melodic called the album "a strong comeback from one of the best and most exciting bands in the pop genre right now", calling tracks "Somebody Who Knows You" and "Okay" favorites.

== Track listing ==
All tracks are written and produced by Sam Harris, Casey Harris, and Adam Levin. Additional writers and producers are included below

The Beautiful Liar track listing
No.	Title	Writer(s)	Producer(s)	Length
1.	"Chapter One: The Sleeping Giant"			0:43
2.	"Beautiful Liar"	Ricky Reed	Reed; Andrew Wells	4:09
3.	"My Own Monster"	Jamie Lidell; Wells; Alan Wilkis	Wells	3:05
4.	"Adrenaline"	Wells	Jared Scharff; Jon Yeston	2:45
5.	"Bullshit"	Daniel Steele; Wells		2:13
6.	"Chapter Two: Enter the Shadow"			1:13
7.	"Conversations With My Friends"	Wells		0:56
8.	"I Can See The Light..."	Fabio Aguilar; Jorge Miguel Cardoso Augusto; Feliciano Ponce Ecar; Al Hug; Harissis Tsakmaklis; Luzian Tuetsch	Aguilar; Ecar; Hug	0:35
9.	"Palo Santo"	Niklas Andre Koellner; Mathias Daniel Liyew; Philip Andre Mueller	Ambezza; Outofair	2:43
10.	"Theater Of War"			1:08
11.	"A Brief Word From Our Sponsors--"			0:32
12.	"Love Is Death"	Kristine Flaherty; Nate Mercereau; Reed; Wells	Mercereau	3:33
13.	"Somebody Who Knows You"	Scharff; Wells	Scharff	3:44
14.	"Okay"	Tommy English; Andrew Jackson; Wells		4:45
15.	"Reincarnated"	Wells		2:33
16.	"Author's Note"			1:19
Total length:				36:03

Note

- "A Brief Word From Our Sponsors--" is stylized is all caps.

== Podcast ==
The Beautiful Liar
- Genre: Serialized audio narrative; Science fiction; Coming of Age; Superhero fiction
- Language: English

Cast and voices
- Starring: Rory Anne Dahl; Emily Hampshire; Sam Nelson Harris

Production
- Length: 30-40 minutes

Publication
- No. of seasons: 1
- No. of episodes: 9
- Original release: November 3, 2021

A nine-episode companion podcast to the album was released on November 3, 2021, on Amazon Music, releasing on all other services November 17, 2021. It is produced and published by QCode Media. It is a superhero origin story, following a blind teenager named Clementine who suddenly loses her father and has to juggle moving to a new school with her new secret friend, Shadow. It stars Rory Anne Dahl as Clementine and Emily Hampshire as the shadow.
