= Danger (Migos and Marshmello song) =

Song by Migos and Marshmello

from the album Bright: The Album
- Released: December 7, 2017
- Genre: Hip hop
- Length: 3:35
- Label: Quality Control; Atlantic
- Songwriters: Chris Comstock; Quavious Marshall; Kiari Cephus; Takeoff (rapper); Paul Judge
- Producers: Judge; Marshmello

Music video
- "Danger" on YouTube

"Danger" is a song by American hip hop group Migos and American DJ & music producer Marshmello, taken from the soundtrack of the 2017 American urban fantasy action crime film, Bright. It was written by the artists alongside Paul Judge, who produced it with Marshmello. The song was released on December 7, 2017. "Danger" debuted at 82 on the Billboard Hot 100. It was certified Gold by the Recording Industry Association of America on April 30, 2019.

== Background ==
The track was teased in the trailer for Bright and on Marshmello's Twitter

== Music video ==
The official music video was released on December 7, 2017, on Atlantic Records' channel.

In the video, Migos and Marshmello can be seen standing in the middle of the nightclub scene in the film, surrounded by neon lights and women. It provides footage from an excerpt of the movie where a cop duo of Will Smith's character, Daryl Ward, who is a human, and Joel Edgerton's Nick Jakoby, who plays an Orc creature, lurk in a crowd in search of a powerful weapon. A pack of men begin opening fire on Ward and Jakoby, causing the pair to escape with the help of an elf, played by Lucy Fry. Migos continues to rap, while champagne glasses and mirrors shatter into pieces around them.

== Charts ==
| Chart (2017) | Peak position |
|---|---|
| Canada Hot 100 (Billboard) | 49 |
| US Billboard Hot 100 | 82 |
| US Hot R&B/Hip-Hop Songs (Billboard) | 34 |

== Certifications ==
| Region | Certification | Certified units/sales |
|---|---|---|
| United States (RIAA) | Platinum | 1,000,000^{‡} |
^{‡} Sales+streaming figures based on certification alone.
