= VHS (album) =

2015 studio album by X Ambassadors

Studio album by X Ambassadors
- Released: June 30, 2015
- Genres: Electropop; alternative rock; electronic rock; pop rock
- Length: 47:33
- Labels: KidinaKorner; Interscope
- Producers: Alex da Kid; X Ambassadors

X Ambassadors chronology
The Reason (2014)	VHS (2015)	Orion (2019)

Singles from VHS
- 1. "Jungle" Released: December 18, 2013; 2. "Renegades" Released: March 3, 2015; 3. "Unsteady" Released: October 13, 2015; 4. "Low Life" Released: June 28, 2016

Alternative cover
- VHS 2.0 cover

Professional ratings
Review scores
Source	Rating
Alternative Addiction	5/5 stars
Billboard	3/5 stars
Brent Music Reviews	3.5/5 stars
Everything Mainstream	5/5 stars
Surviving the Golden Age	5/10 stars

VHS is the debut studio album by American pop rock band X Ambassadors. It was released on June 30, 2015, by KIDinaKORNER and Interscope Records. The album follows the band's major label EP releases, Love Songs Drug Songs (2013) and The Reason (2014), the latter of which spawned the lead single of VHS, "Jungle" featuring Jamie N. Commons. The album spawned three other singles, "Renegades", "Unsteady", and "Low Life". It is the only album to feature lead guitarist Noah Feldshuh before he took an indefinite hiatus in 2016.

== Track listing ==
VHS – Standard edition
No.	Title	Writer(s)	Producer(s)	Length
1.	"Y2K Time Capsule" (intro)	Sam Harris; Rob Harris	X Ambassadors; Alex da Kid	0:31
2.	"Renegades"	X Ambassadors; Alexander Grant	Alex da Kid	3:14
3.	"Moving Day" (interlude)	S. Harris; R. Harris; Casey Harris; Margaret Wakeley	X Ambassadors; Alex da Kid	0:19
4.	"Unsteady"	X Ambassadors; Grant	Alex da Kid	3:13
5.	"Hang On"	X Ambassadors; Grant; Jayson DeZuzio	Alex da Kid; DeZuzio	3:00
6.	"Gorgeous"	X Ambassadors; Grant	Alex da Kid	3:17
7.	"First Show" (interlude)	S. Harris; Noah Feldshuh; Nicholas Farhi	X Ambassadors; Alex da Kid	0:11
8.	"Fear" (featuring Imagine Dragons)	X Ambassadors; Grant; Dan Reynolds	Alex da Kid	2:41
9.	"Smoke" (interlude)	S. Harris; Feldshuh	X Ambassadors; Alex da Kid	0:24
10.	"Nervous"	X Ambassadors; Grant	Alex da Kid	3:33
11.	"Low Life" (featuring Jamie N Commons)	X Ambassadors; DeZuzio; Jamie N Commons	Alex da Kid; DeZuzio	4:40
12.	"Adam & Noah's Priorities" (interlude)	Adam Levin; Feldshuh	X Ambassadors; Alex da Kid	0:27
13.	"B.I.G."	X Ambassadors; Grant	X Ambassadors; Alex da Kid	3:29
14.	"Feather"	X Ambassadors; Grant	Alex da Kid	3:16
15.	"Superpower"	X Ambassadors; Grant	X Ambassadors; Alex da Kid	3:12
16.	"Loveless"	X Ambassadors; Grant	X Ambassadors; Alex da Kid	3:19
17.	"Jungle" (with Jamie N Commons)	X Ambassadors; Grant; Commons; Mike Del Rio	Alex da Kid; Del Rio	3:09
18.	"Good News on the Remix" (interlude)	S. Harris; Grant	X Ambassadors; Alex da Kid	0:51
19.	"Naked"	X Ambassadors; Grant	X Ambassadors; Alex da Kid	3:21
20.	"VHS Outro"	C. Harris; S. Harris; Levin	X Ambassadors; Alex da Kid	1:25
Total length:				47:33

VHS – Target exclusive bonus tracks
No.	Title	Length
21.	"Skin"	4:26
22.	"Heist"	3:34
Total length:		55:33

VHS 2.0
No.	Title	Length
1.	"Renegades"	3:14
2.	"Unsteady"	3:13
3.	"Hang On"	3:00
4.	"Gorgeous"	3:17
5.	"Fear" (featuring Imagine Dragons)	2:41
6.	"Nervous"	2:41
7.	"Low Life" (featuring Jamie N Commons)	4:40
8.	"B.I.G."	3:29
9.	"Feather"	3:16
10.	"Superpower"	3:12
11.	"Loveless"	3:19
12.	"Jungle" (with Jamie N Commons)	3:09
13.	"Naked"	3:21
14.	"Low Life 2.0" (featuring Jamie N Commons & A$AP Ferg)	3:26
15.	"Kerosene Dreams"	3:53
16.	"Collider" (featuring Tom Morello)	3:19
17.	"Gorgeous (Upstate Sessions)"	3:44
18.	"Eye of the Storm"	3:46
Total length:		61:33

== Personnel ==
=== X Ambassadors ===
- Sam Harris – lead and backing vocals, acoustic, bass and electric guitars, saxophone, additional percussion
- Casey Harris – piano, backing vocals, keyboards, synthesizers
- Adam Levin – drums, percussion
- Noah Feldshuh – bass and electric guitars, backing vocals

=== Additional musicians ===
- Jamie N Commons – additional guitar and vocals (on "Jungle" and "Low Life")
- Imagine Dragons – additional vocals and instrumentation (on "Fear")
- A$AP Ferg – rap vocals on (on "Low Life 2.0")
- Tom Morello – additional guitar (on "Collider")

== Charts ==
=== Weekly charts ===
Chart (2015–16)	Peak position
Belgian Albums (Ultratop Flanders)	181
Canadian Albums (Billboard)	2
French Albums (SNEP)	85
German Albums (Offizielle Top 100)	56
Scottish Albums (Official Charts)	30
UK Albums (Official Charts)	41
UK Album Downloads (Official Charts)	22
US Billboard 200	7
US Top Rock Albums (Billboard)	3

=== Year-end charts ===
Chart (2015)	Position
US Billboard 200	139
US Top Rock Albums (Billboard)	36

Chart (2016)	Position
Canadian Albums (Billboard)	34
US Billboard 200	70
US Top Rock Albums (Billboard)	40

== Certifications ==
Region	Certification	Certified units/sales
Canada (Music Canada)	2× Platinum	160,000^{‡}
Canada (Music Canada) VHS 2.0	Platinum	80,000^{‡}
New Zealand (RMNZ)	Platinum	15,000^{‡}
Poland (ZPAV)	Gold	10,000^{‡}
United States (RIAA)	Platinum	1,000,000^{‡}
^{‡} Sales+streaming figures based on certification alone.

== Release history ==
Region	Date	Format(s)	Label	Ref.
United States	June 30, 2015	CD; digital download	KIDinaKORNER; Geffen; Interscope	
United Kingdom	January 1, 2016	Digital download	KIDinaKORNER; Geffen; Interscope	

== VHS(X) ==
VHS(X)

Studio album (re-recorded) by X Ambassadors
- Released: August 29, 2025
- Genres: Alternative rock; indie rock; soul; pop rock
- Length: 40:26
- Labels: Virgin; Nyle
- Producer: X Ambassadors

X Ambassadors chronology
Townies (2024)	VHS(X) (2025)

Singles from VHS(X)
- 1. "Unsteady (Rerecorded)" Released: June 27, 2025; 2. "Renegades (Rerecorded)" Released: July 25, 2025; 3. "Jungle (Rerecorded)" Released: August 29, 2025

On August 29, 2025, X Ambassadors released a re-recorded version of VHS, titled VHS(X), for its tenth anniversary. The album was entirely produced by the band. The rerecorded versions of "Unsteady", "Renegades", and "Jungle" were released in promotion of the album, and the band embarked on the VHS(X) Tour in September 2025, where they played every song from the record.

== Track listing ==
VHS(X)
No.	Title	Length
1.	"Renegades" (Rerecorded)	3:15
2.	"Unsteady" (Rerecorded)	3:37
3.	"Hang On" (Rerecorded)	3:32
4.	"Naked" (Rerecorded)	3:35
5.	"Gorgeous" (Rerecorded)	2:41
6.	"Fear" (Rerecorded)	2:51
7.	"Low Life" (Rerecorded)	4:21
8.	"Nervous" (Rerecorded)	3:27
9.	"Feather" (Rerecorded)	3:06
10.	"Superpower" (Rerecorded)	3:08
11.	"Loveless" (Rerecorded)	3:38
12.	"Jungle" (Rerecorded)	3:15
Total length:		40:26
