= Bright (film) =

2017 American film by David Ayer

- Promotional release poster
- Directed by: David Ayer
- Written by: Max Landis
- Produced by: Eric Newman; David Ayer; Bryan Unkeless; Ted Sarandos
- Starring: Will Smith; Joel Edgerton; Noomi Rapace; Lucy Fry; Édgar Ramírez; Ike Barinholtz
- Cinematography: Roman Vasyanov
- Edited by: Michael Tronick; Geoffrey O'Brien
- Music by: David Sardy
- Production companies: Netflix; Trigger Warning Entertainment; Grand Electric
- Distributed by: Netflix
- Release dates: December 13, 2017 (Regency Village Theater); December 22, 2017 (United States)
- Running time: 118 minutes
- Country: United States
- Language: English
- Budget: $90–106.2 million

Bright is a 2017 American urban fantasy action film produced and directed by David Ayer, and written by Max Landis. The film is set in an alternate present in which humans and mythical creatures co-exist and details an LAPD police officer (portrayed by Will Smith) and his orc partner (Joel Edgerton) confronting racism and police corruption while protecting a magic wand and the elf girl (Lucy Fry) who wields it. Noomi Rapace, Édgar Ramírez, and Ike Barinholtz also star.

Principal photography began in November 2016 in Los Angeles. The film was released worldwide on Netflix on December 22, 2017. While it has received generally negative reviews from critics, it was exceptionally popular with viewers. Netflix called it one of the company's most successful original programs as of January 2018. It spawned an anime spin-off film, Bright: Samurai Soul, in 2021.

== Plot ==
Humans coexist with other sentient species, notably orcs and elves. Magic is real, but it is illegal to practice. Magic wands exist, but only a few individuals called "Brights" can wield them without dying.

In Los Angeles, veteran officer Daryl Ward is involuntarily partnered with Nick Jakoby, the first orc police officer ever in the US. Jakoby is detested by the other police officers for his species and by orcs for being a policeman. Ward's relationship with Jakoby is strained since Ward was shot by an orc robber whom Jakoby failed to apprehend; Internal Affairs suspects Jakoby deliberately let him go.

One night, Ward and Jakoby respond to a disturbance at a safe house for the Shield of Light, an extremist group that prophesies the return of the Dark Lord, an ancient semi-mythical figure defeated millennia ago. The lone survivor is Tikka, an elf girl, who has a wand. Ward calls for backup, but when the four arriving officers see the wand, they try to coerce Ward into killing Jakoby and letting them steal it for themselves.

The four officers give Ward a choice between him and Jakoby being killed or just Jakoby being killed, wanting to steal the wand for themselves. Ward initially accepts the second option, but then demands the truth about the robber from Jakoby. Jakoby admits he lost sight of Ward's assailant and mistakenly apprehended a younger orc, whom he then helped flee, knowing that the police would most likely kill the boy on sight. After learning the truth, Ward decides to shoot and kill all four of the officers instead. The gunfire attracts the attention of a Hispanic gang, while rumors of the wand draw the attentions of both its owner Leilah, the leader of the radical elf sect the Inferni; and Kandomere, an elf FBI agent assigned to the federal Magic Task Force. The gangsters corner the trio in a strip club as their leader demands the wand to cure his paralysis. They are slaughtered by Leilah, allowing the trio to escape. At a service station, Ward contacts his friend, Deputy Sheriff Rodriguez, who contacts Kandomere, but Leilah intercepts their conversation. While attacking the service station, she kills Rodriguez.

Escaping again, the trio is captured by the Fogteeth Orcs, whose leader Dorghu also wants the wand. He orders his son Mikey to kill Jakoby. However, Mikey is the orc that Jakoby had saved, so Mikey refuses to kill him. Sending Mikey away, Dorghu kills Jakoby himself. As he prepares to kill Ward, Tikka uses the wand to resurrect Jakoby, showing she is a Bright. The Fogteeth's shaman pronounces this to be part of a prophecy, causing the clan to kneel to them, setting them free. Tikka explains that the Inferni believe that assembling three wands will allow them to resurrect the Dark Lord. She was once a member of the Inferni but fled the group and was sheltered by the Shield of Light. Leilah loaned her wand to a Bright assassin to kill Tikka. Tikka killed the assassin, taking the wand.

Using the wand to resurrect Jakoby has made Tikka gravely ill, and she can only be healed in a magical pool at the safe house. Returning there, they are ambushed by Leilah and her enforcers. In the confrontation, Leilah's guards are killed, but she holds Tikka helpless as Ward and Jakoby run out of ammunition. Ward grabs the wand, believing that the resulting explosion will kill all of them. To everyone's amazement, Ward does not die, revealing he is a Bright. He kills Leilah with the wand, triggering an explosion that sets the building on fire. Tikka disappears, and the injured Ward and Jakoby escape the building, with Jakoby leading the way. After exiting, he realizes Ward is not with him and is trapped inside. Casting aside first responders, Jakoby charges back into the building, pulling his partner from the flames and debris just in time. This act of bravery is witnessed by the Fogteeth clan, so Dorghu 'bloods' Jakoby (a mark of great respect within Orc society).

Ward and Jakoby know that the FBI want knowledge of magical activity kept secret. At a hospital, they give Kandomere a doctored account of the previous night's events. Kandomere understands the deception but accepts their tale regardless. In a public ceremony, Jakoby and Ward are celebrated as heroes, and Rodriguez's memory is honored. Ward smiles as he spots Tikka moving through the crowd in disguise.

== Cast ==
- Will Smith as Daryl Ward, a human LAPD officer.
- Joel Edgerton as Nick Jakoby, the nation's first orc police officer who is partnered with Daryl.
- Noomi Rapace as Leilah, an Inferni elf seeking control of the magic wand.
- Lucy Fry as Tikka, a young Inferni elf who is in possession of the magic wand.
- Édgar Ramírez as Kandomere, a high ranking elvish federal agent with the US Department of Magic's Magic Task Force.
- Ike Barinholtz as Pollard, a corrupt human LAPD officer who seeks to steal the wand for himself.
- Happy Anderson as Hildebrandt Ulysses Montehugh, a human federal agent who works under Kandomere in the Magic Task Force.
- Dawn Olivieri as Sherri Ward, Daryl's human wife and Sophia's mother.
- Matt Gerald as Hicks, a corrupt human LAPD officer.
- Margaret Cho as Ching, a corrupt human LAPD sergeant.
- Brad William Henke as Dorghu, the imposing leader of the Fogteeth Orcs gang.
- Jay Hernandez as Rodriguez, a human LASD deputy.
- Veronica Ngo as Tien, an Inferni elf enforcer working for Leilah.
- Alex Meraz as Serafin, an Inferni elf enforcer working for Leilah.
- Nadia Gray as Larika, an elf assassin working for Leilah.
- Joseph Piccuirro as Brown, a corrupt human LAPD officer.
- Enrique Murciano as "Poison", the crippled leader of the human Altamira gang who uses a wheelchair.
- Scarlet Spencer as Sophia Ward, Daryl and Sherri's human daughter.
- Andrea Navedo as Perez, a human LAPD captain and Ward's superior.
- Kenneth Choi as Yamahara, a human LAPD internal affairs detective.
- Bobby Naderi as Arkashian, a human LAPD internal affairs detective.
- Cle Shaheed Sloan as Mike "O.G. Mike", the Wards' human neighbor.
- Chris Browning as Serling, a human questioned by the US Department of Magic's Task Force.
- Joe Rogan as Himself, seen interviewing an orc about Jakoby.

== Production ==
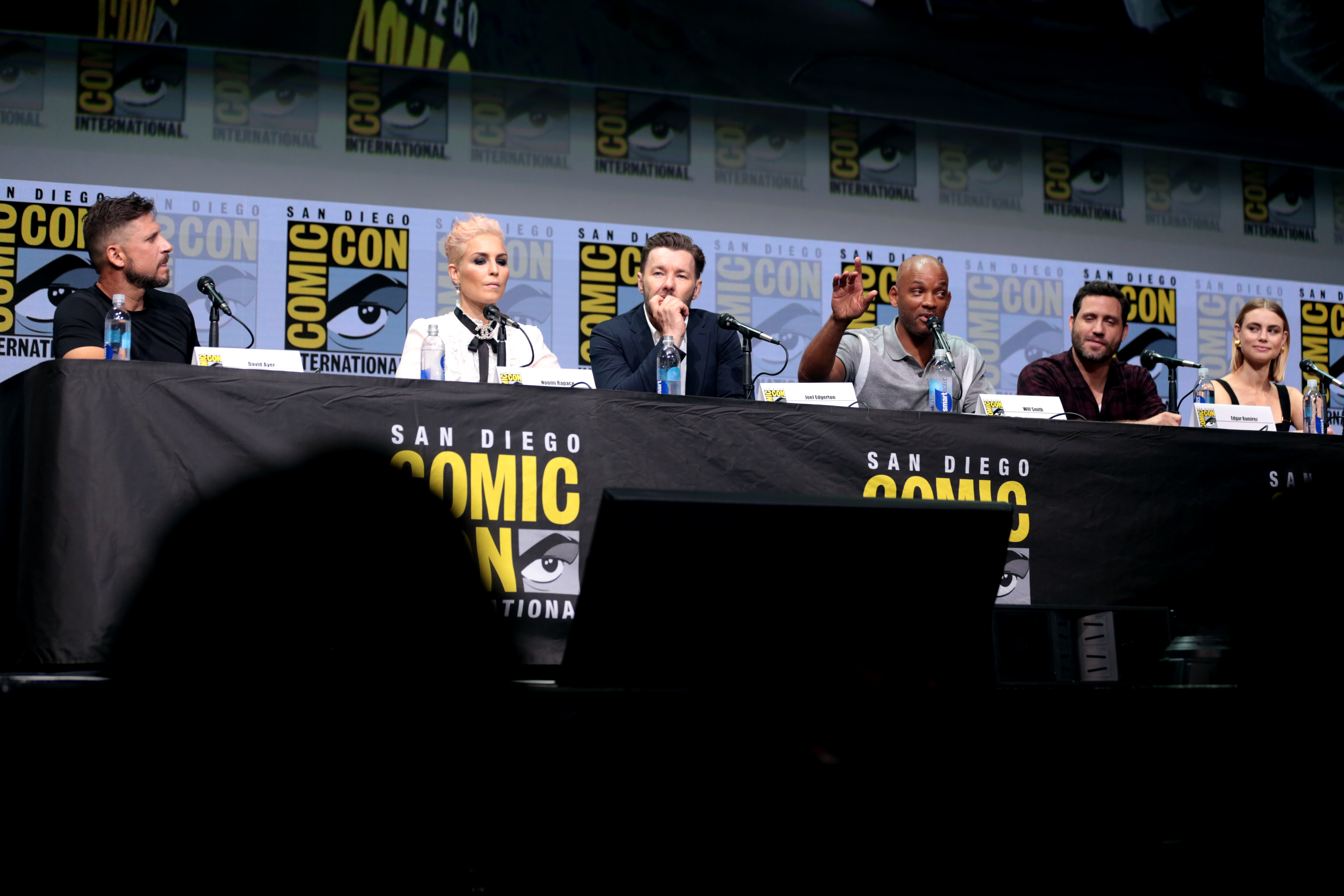
(L–R): Director David Ayer and stars Noomi Rapace, Joel Edgerton, Will Smith, Édgar Ramírez, and Lucy Fry at the 2017 San Diego Comic-Con

Described as "a contemporary cop thriller, but with fantastical elements", the film was directed by David Ayer and stars Will Smith and Joel Edgerton, with a script penned by Max Landis, which Ayer rewrote. Netflix officially picked up the film for a $90 million deal with filming beginning in fall 2016, making it the most expensive Netflix film to date. Noomi Rapace entered talks to join the cast in May 2016. Landis stated in an interview that official production was expected to begin in September 2016, but that they had already shot a small part in Los Angeles. Ayer's frequent cinematographer, Roman Vasyanov, was confirmed to be working on the project. On October 15, 2016, Lucy Fry was added to the cast. On October 17, 2016, Andrea Navedo was added to the cast. On October 20, 2016, actor Brad William Henke was cast in the film. On November 1, 2016, Kenneth Choi and Dawn Olivieri were cast in an unnamed role and the role of Smith's wife, respectively. On November 9, Édgar Ramírez was confirmed to be added to the cast. That same month, Alex Meraz, Matt Gerald, Ike Barinholtz and Enrique Murciano joined the cast of the film in undisclosed roles.

=== Filming ===
Photos from the set were first published in November 2016. Filming was completed by February 4, 2017.

== Reception ==
=== Critical response ===
Bright received criticism for its screenplay, cinematography, poor worldbuilding, and ineffective and heavy-handed social commentary. On Rotten Tomatoes, the film holds an approval rating of 26% based on 113 reviews, with an average rating of 4.1/10. The website's critical consensus reads, "Bright tries to blend fantasy, hard-hitting cop drama, and social commentary—and ends up falling painfully short of the mark on all three fronts." On Metacritic the film has a weighted average score of 29 out of 100, based on 26 critics, indicating "generally unfavorable" reviews.

Richard Roeper of the Chicago Sun-Times gave a negative review of 1.5 stars out of 4. He said: "Bright is basically a tired buddy-cop movie dressed up in bizarre trappings ... It doesn't take itself too seriously, but it's not nearly as self-deprecating and funny as it needed to be." Writing for Rolling Stone, David Fear gave the film 1 out of 4 stars, criticizing the script and incoherent action scenes, writing: "This combo of gritty cop procedural and fantasy is a dark, dank, dumb-as-hell mess."

David Ehrlich of IndieWire gave the film an "F" and called it the worst film of 2017, saying: "There's boring, there's bad, and then there's Bright ... from the director of Suicide Squad and the writer of Victor Frankenstein comes a fresh slice of hell that somehow represents new lows for them both—a dull and painfully derivative ordeal that often feels like it was made just to put those earlier misfires into perspective." Ayer responded enthusiastically to Ehrlich's review, claiming that he desired for the film to receive "a strong reaction either way."

NPR's Chris Klimek wrote: "Critics have already lined up to pillory Bright as among the year's worst releases. Don't believe the clickbait. Lazy but not boring, this Net-flick is perfectly, stubbornly mediocre, and less a chore to sit through than either of 2017's Vin Diesel vehicles," referring to XXX: Return of Xander Cage and The Fate of the Furious.

=== Audience response ===
Several publications noted that while critics were harsh in their assessment of the film, viewers liked it and gave positive reactions on social media. Netflix announced that the film had been viewed more times in its first week than any of its other releases. According to Nielsen ratings, about 11 million American viewers streamed Bright within the first three days of its release, with 56% of the audience being male and 7 million being between the ages of 18 and 49.

In January 2018 Netflix reported that the popularity of Bright gave "a major lift" to the company's revenue and number of new subscribers in the last quarter of 2017. CEO Reed Hastings stated, "The critics are pretty disconnected from the mass appeal...[they] are an important part of the artistic process but are pretty disconnected from the commercial prospects of a film. If people are watching this movie and loving it, that's the measurement of success."

== Soundtrack ==
Bright: The Album

Soundtrack album by Various artists
- Released: December 15, 2017
- Genres: Hip hop; pop; rock
- Length: 42:50
- Labels: Atlantic; WEA International
- Producers: Alex da Kid; Dan Smith; Mark Crew; David Pramik; David Phelps; Grey; Louis Bell; Linus Wiklund; JMIKE; AC; Andrew Bolooki; Paul Judge; Marshmello; Viruss Beats; Steve Aoki; DJ Khalil; D. Sardy; Casey Bates; Charlie Andrew; Joe London; DRAM; Gabriel Niles; Zach Crowell

Singles from Bright: The Album
- 1. "World Gone Mad" Released: November 21, 2017; 2. "Home" Released: December 5, 2017

The soundtrack, titled Bright: The Album, was released under Atlantic Records on December 15, 2017, just a week before the official release of the film on December 22, 2017. It features songs performed by various artists including Future, Camila Cabello, Logic, Marshmello, Ty Dolla Sign, Bebe Rexha, Lil Uzi Vert, Snoop Dogg, and X Ambassadors.

Bright: The Album
No.	Title	Writer(s)	Producer(s)	Length
1.	"Broken People" (Logic and Rag'n'Bone Man)	Dan Priddy; Mark Crew; Alexander Grant; Rory Graham; Sir Robert Hall II; Nicholas Steele; David Pramik	Alex da Kid	3:32
2.	"World Gone Mad" (Bastille)	Dan Smith	Smith; Mark Crew	3:16
3.	"Home" (Machine Gun Kelly, X Ambassadors and Bebe Rexha)	Sam Nelson Harris; David Phelps; Robert Gillies; Colson Baker; Pramik; Jacob Hawkes; Charlie Snyder	David Pramik; Phelps	3:22
4.	"Crown" (Camila Cabello and Grey)	Camila Cabello; Kyle Trewartha; Michael Trewartha; Sarah Aarons	Grey; Louis Bell	3:21
5.	"Darkside" (Ty Dolla Sign and Future featuring Kiiara)	Jeremy Coleman; Linus Wiklund; Nayvadius Wilburn; Tyrone Griffin Jr.; Kiara Saulters; Jonnali Parmenius	Wiklund; JMIKE; AC; Andrew Bolooki	3:53
6.	"Danger" (Migos and Marshmello)	Chris Comstock; Quavious Marshall; Kiari Cephus; Kirshnik Ball; Paul Judge	Judge; Marshmello	3:34
7.	"That's My Nigga" (Meek Mill, YG and Snoop Dogg)	Shawn Carter; Andre Young; Melvin Bradford; Scott Storch; Robert Williams; Calvin Broadus Jr.; Eric Gamzoyan; Keenan Jackson	Viruss Beats	3:19
8.	"Smoke My Dope" (Steve Aoki and Lil Uzi Vert)	Steven Aoki; Symere Woods; Bobby Turner; Kenneth Smith	Steve Aoki	3:22
9.	"FTW (Fuck the World)" (ASAP Rocky and Tom Morello)	Thomas Morello; Khalil Abdul-Rahman; Rakim Mayers	DJ Khalil	2:23
10.	"Cheer Up" (Portugal. The Man)	David Sardy; Casey Bates; John Gourley	D. Sardy; Bates	2:46
11.	"Hares on the Mountain" (alt-J)	Traditional	Charlie Andrew	3:48
12.	"Campfire" (DRAM and Neil Young)	Joe Spargur; Shelley Massenburg-Smith; Roget Chahayed; Gabriel Niles	Joe London; D.R.A.M.; Niles	3:40
13.	"This Land Is Your Land" (Sam Hunt)	Woody Guthrie	Zach Crowell	2:34
Total length:				42:50

=== Charts ===
Weekly chart performance for album
Chart (2017–18)	Peak position
Australian Albums (ARIA)	85
Canadian Albums (Billboard)	13
Dutch Albums (Album Top 100)	92
Finnish Albums (Suomen virallinen lista)	18
German Albums (Offizielle Top 100)	97
New Zealand Albums (RMNZ)	24
US Billboard 200	48
US Top R&B/Hip-Hop Albums (Billboard)	28

Annual chart rankings for "World Gone Mad"
Chart (2018)	Rank
Netherlands Airplay (Airplay Top 40)	84

== Future ==
=== Scrapped sequel ===
In December 2017, Netflix ordered a sequel. The following month, Netflix confirmed the sequel was moving ahead, with Smith and Edgerton reprising their roles and Ayer directing and writing the script with Evan Spiliotopoulos. In August 2018, it was announced the film would begin filming in March 2019 in Germany. In September 2019, Lucy Fry revealed that production had been delayed, citing Smith's busy schedule. In May 2020, it was reported that Netflix had entered negotiations with Louis Leterrier to direct the sequel. In April 2022, following Smith's altercation with Chris Rock at the Academy Awards, Netflix scrapped the film.

=== Anime spin-off ===
In June 2021, Netflix announced that an anime spin-off film called Bright: Samurai Soul would be produced. It was announced that Kyōhei Ishiguro would direct the film, with Michiko Yokote writing the film's script, Atsushi Yamagata designing the characters, and Arect animating the film. The film premiered on October 12, 2021.
