= Unsteady (song) =

Single by X Ambassadors

from the album VHS
- Released: October 13, 2015
- Recorded: 2014
- Genre: Indie rock; alternative rock
- Length: 3:13
- Label: KidinaKorner; Geffen; Interscope
- Songwriters: Alexander Grant; Sam Harris; Noah Feldshuh; Casey Harris; Adam Levin
- Producers: Alex da Kid; X Ambassadors

X Ambassadors singles chronology
"Cannonball" (2015)	"Unsteady" (2015)	"Low-Life" (2016)

Music video
- "Unsteady" on YouTube

"Unsteady" is a ballad by American rock band X Ambassadors. It was originally part of the band's second EP The Reason and was later released as the third single from the band's debut studio album, VHS, on October 13, 2015. The song has a remix version entitled "Unsteady (Erich Lee Gravity Remix)", a single for the motion picture soundtrack for the film Me Before You.

== Composition ==
In an interview with Best New Bands frontman Sam Nelson Harris discussed the main inspiration for the song

"This song is about our parents getting divorced when we were in high school. I was a little bit uncomfortable when I decided to make the song about that... I felt like everyone's parents get divorced. Who am I to say anything about it, it's not a big deal? But I think precisely for that reason, I decided that was why I had to write. We have a great relationship with our parents and our stepmother. We love them so much. We wanted to really emphasize there's a blamelessness there. These things happen. Relationships fall apart. Families fall apart. No one is to blame."

According to the sheet music published at MusicNotes.com, the song is written in the key of B minor, with a tempo of 58 beats per minute.

== Accolades ==
"Unsteady" was nominated for Top Rock Song at the 2017 Billboard Music Awards.

== Music video ==
Influenced by the song's theme of divorce, the music video follows a couple at two points in their relationship: the moment they fell in love, and the moment they knew their relationship was over. The song shows how habits that may have been "fun and spontaneous" when young can turn into serious problems when they begin to affect an adult family life where children can be influenced by those choices.

The video was directed by ENDS (Zack Sekuler and Daniel Iglesias Jr.)

== Charts ==
=== Weekly charts ===
Chart (2015–2016)	Peak position
Australia (ARIA)	94
Canada Hot 100 (Billboard)	61
Canada AC (Billboard)	25
Canada CHR/Top 40 (Billboard)	19
Canada Hot AC (Billboard)	23
Canada Rock (Billboard)	11
US Billboard Hot 100	20
US Adult Contemporary (Billboard)	12
US Adult Pop Airplay (Billboard)	4
US Hot Rock & Alternative Songs (Billboard)	2
US Pop Airplay (Billboard)	10
US Rock & Alternative Airplay (Billboard)	6
Chart (2017–2018)	Peak position
Sweden Heatseeker (Sverigetopplistan)	2
Chart (2018–19)	Peak position
Scotland Singles (OCC)	73
UK Singles Downloads (OCC)	93
Chart (2021)	Peak position
Switzerland (Schweizer Hitparade)	77

=== Year-end charts ===
Chart (2016)	Position
US Billboard Hot 100	67
US Hot Rock Songs (Billboard)	5
US Adult Contemporary (Billboard)	38
US Adult Top 40 (Billboard)	9
US Rock Airplay (Billboard)	22

Chart (2017)	Position
US Hot Rock Songs (Billboard)	9

=== Decade-end charts ===
Chart (2010–2019)	Position
US Hot Rock Songs (Billboard)	25

== Certifications ==
Region	Certification	Certified units/sales
Australia (ARIA)	Platinum	70,000^{‡}
Canada (Music Canada)	5× Platinum	400,000^{‡}
Denmark (IFPI Danmark)	Platinum	90,000^{‡}
Germany (BVMI)	Gold	200,000^{‡}
Italy (FIMI)	Gold	25,000^{‡}
New Zealand (RMNZ)	3× Platinum	90,000^{‡}
United Kingdom (BPI)	Platinum	600,000^{‡}
United States (RIAA)	5× Platinum	717,000
^{‡} Sales+streaming figures based on certification alone.
