= Love Songs Drug Songs =

EP by X Ambassadors
- Released: May 7, 2013
- Genre: Alternative rock; indie rock
- Length: 24:06
- Label: Geffen; Interscope; KIDinaKORNER

X Ambassadors chronology
Litost (2012)	Love Songs Drug Songs (2013)	The Reason (2014)

Singles from Love Songs Drug Songs
- 1. "Unconsolable" Released: October 25, 2013

Love Songs Drug Songs is the third and major-label debut EP by American rock band X Ambassadors, released on May 7, 2013. The EP is the band's first release under the X Ambassadors name following their signing onto Interscope Records. It spawned one single: "Unconsolable".

== Composition ==
Shannon Carlin of Radio.com described the style of Love Songs Drug Songs as being "in the vein of old '60s soul, '90s R&B, and funk". Matt Collar of AllMusic stated, "Musically, X Ambassadors build a percussive mix of synthesizers, booming drums, and atmospheric guitar lines around vocalist Sam Harris' yearning, robust cry" while revealing "their love for mixing contemporary R&B inflections with a sweeping, '80s new wave sensibility".

According to X Ambassadors frontman Sam Harris, the album is inspired by the "bizarre" and "dreary" town of Ithaca that is "rainy and cold for 80 percent of the time". Nadia Noir of KROQ-FM noted the "sly irreverence and naughty hip-hop style sexual references in some of the songs" on the album. Speaking of the message of the EP, Harris stated, "I don’t know what we want to say. But we have to say something."

== Critical reception ==
Writing for AllMusic, Matt Collar rated Love Songs Drug Songs four stars out of five, calling it "a passionate, literate, and moving collection". In a very positive review, Robert Treves of Indie Current said the album "is packed full of triumphant, genre-blending tracks." He commented, "X Ambassadors [...] have really defined their own sound throughout this release."

== Track listing ==
All tracks are written by X Ambassadors except where noted.

Love Songs Drug Songs track listing
No.	Title	Writer(s)	Producer(s)	Length
1.	"Unconsolable"		X Ambassadors; Daniel Stringer	3:36
2.	"Love Songs Drug Songs"	X Ambassadors; Alexander Grant	Grant	3:39
3.	"Down with Me"		X Ambassadors; Stringer	3:37
4.	"Stranger"	X Ambassadors; Grant; Dan Reynolds	Grant	4:03
5.	"Litost"		Stringer; X Ambassadors	5:21
6.	"Brother"		X Ambassadors	3:48
Total length:				24:06

== Personnel ==
X Ambassadors

- Sam Harris – vocals, guitar
- Casey Harris – keyboard
- Noah Feldshuh – guitar
- Adam Levin – drums

== Charts ==
Chart (2013)	Peak position
US Heatseekers Albums (Billboard)	11
