= Home (Machine Gun Kelly, X Ambassadors and Bebe Rexha song) =

2017 single by Machine Gun Kelly, X Ambassadors, and Bebe Rexha

Single by Machine Gun Kelly, X Ambassadors, and Bebe Rexha

from the album Bright: The Album
- Released: December 5, 2017
- Recorded: 2017
- Genre: Hip hop • pop-rap • pop
- Length: 3:21
- Label: Atlantic
- Songwriters: Colson Baker; Jacob Hawkes; Charlie Snyder; Robert Gillies; Sam Nelson Harris; David Pramik; David Phelps
- Producers: David Pramik; David Phelps

Machine Gun Kelly singles chronology
"Go for Broke" (2017)	"Home" (2017)	"Too Good to Be True" (2018)

X Ambassadors singles chronology
"Ahead of Myself" (2017)	"Home" (2017)	"Joyful" (2018)

Bebe Rexha singles chronology
"Meant to Be" (2017)	"Home" (2017)	"Push Back" (2018)

"Home" is a song by American rapper and singer Machine Gun Kelly, American rock band X Ambassadors, and American singer Bebe Rexha. The song was sent to radio on December 5, 2017, by Atlantic Records as the second single from the Netflix film Bright. It was written by MGK, Sam Harris of X Ambassadors, Jacob Hawkes, Charlie Snyder, Robert Gillies, and producers D. Phelps and David Pramik. The song marks David Ayer's second film to feature X Ambassadors on its soundtrack, following "Sucker for Pain" from the 2016 film Suicide Squad.

The song peaked at No. 74 in Australia, No. 43 in Canada, and No. 90 on the US Billboard Hot 100. The music video was released on YouTube on November 23, 2017, a month before the film was released. As of February 2025, it has received 232 million views.

== Background and release ==
The Netflix urban fantasy action film Bright was released on December 22, 2017. The film's accompanying soundtrack album, Bright: The Album, was released on December 15, 2017. "Home" was previewed in a trailer for Bright, and plays over the end credits. The song was sent to radio on December 5, 2017.

=== Live performances ===
Machine Gun Kelly first performed the song on December 5, 2017, during his performance at the WWE Tribute to the Troops 2017 together with Bebe Rexha and Sam Harris of X Ambassadors. They then performed it together during the season 13 results episode of The Voice.

== Composition ==
According to Machine Gun Kelly, he wrote his verses on the same day that he found out Chester Bennington of Linkin Park had died due to suicide. He also said that "It feels like we all recorded it from the same emotional place. Home can be anything… A person, a dream, an escape — whatever it is, we all want a home.”. In line with the film, it tackles themes of race violence and discrimination.

== Music video ==
The music video was shot and directed in South Los Angeles by David Ayer, the director of the film Bright. It shows Machine Gun Kelly coming home from incarceration. The mystical creatures from Bright are also shown being harassed by the police in the video, with Machine Gun Kelly, Rexha, and Harris standing up for them.

== Track listing ==
Digital download
No.	Title	Length
1.	"Home" (Machine Gun Kelly, X Ambassadors and Bebe Rexha)	3:21

== Charts ==
Chart (2017–18)	Peak position
Australia (ARIA)	74
Austria (Ö3 Austria Top 40)	32
Belgium (Ultratop 50 Flanders)	41
Belgium (Ultratip Bubbling Under Wallonia)	39
Canada Hot 100 (Billboard)	43
Czech Republic Airplay (ČNS IFPI)	17
Czech Republic Singles Digital (ČNS IFPI)	29
Germany (GfK)	27
Hungary (Stream Top 40)	34
Ireland (IRMA)	74
Latvia (DigiTop100)	51
Netherlands (Single Top 100)	93
New Zealand (Recorded Music NZ)	30
Norway (VG-lista)	12
Portugal (AFP)	67
Slovakia Airplay (ČNS IFPI)	82
Slovakia Singles Digital (ČNS IFPI)	33
Sweden (Sverigetopplistan)	99
Switzerland (Schweizer Hitparade)	39
UK Singles (Official Charts)	64
US Billboard Hot 100	90
US Hot R&B/Hip-Hop Songs (Billboard)	35
US Rhythmic Airplay (Billboard)	38

== Certifications ==
Region	Certification	Certified units/sales
Denmark (IFPI Danmark)	Gold	45,000^{‡}
New Zealand (RMNZ)	2× Platinum	60,000^{‡}
Norway (IFPI Norway)	3× Platinum	180,000^{‡}
Poland (ZPAV)	Gold	25,000^{‡}
United Kingdom (BPI)	Gold	400,000^{‡}
United States (RIAA)	Platinum	1,000,000^{‡}
^{‡} Sales+streaming figures based on certification alone.

== Release history ==
Region	Date	Format	Label	Ref.
United States	December 5, 2017	Contemporary hit radio	Atlantic	
