= Renegades (X Ambassadors song) =

2015 single by X Ambassadors

Single by X Ambassadors

from the album VHS
- B-side: "Unconsolable"
- Released: March 3, 2015
- Genre: Alternative rock
- Length: 3:15
- Label: KidinaKorner; Geffen; Interscope
- Songwriters: Noah Feldshuh; Alexander Grant; Casey Harris; Adam Levin; Samuel Harris
- Producers: Alex da Kid; X Ambassadors

X Ambassadors singles chronology
"Jungle" (2013)	"Renegades" (2015)	"American Oxygen" (2015)

Music video
- "Renegades" on YouTube "Renegades (Official Lyric Video)" on YouTube

"Renegades" is a song by American rock band X Ambassadors. It was released as the second single from the band's debut studio album VHS on March 3, 2015. It peaked inside the top ten in ten countries, including France, Germany, Canada and Poland, where it reached number one. In the United States, the song peaked at number 17 on the Billboard Hot 100 and was certified Platinum by the RIAA. The song was nominated for the "Top Rock Song" award at the 2016 Billboard Music Awards.

== Background ==
The song was leveraged as a commercial tie-in with the release of the Jeep Renegade. It was delivered very quickly, just a few days after the request was sent in to Interscope Records as the song was nearly complete when Jeep first approached Interscope. It has been the band's most successful song so far. "We're trying not to get too caught up in everything," X Ambassadors vocalist Sam Harris said. "We're just glad people like ['Renegades'] and that it's having a positive effect on them." The song was also featured in the second season of The Flash, the third season of Mr. Robot, and the first season of Black Doves (in the third episode, "The Coming Night").

== Composition ==
"Renegades" is a song in B minor, written with a tempo of 90 bpm. It follows a chord progression of Bm–D–A–G.

== Music video ==
The music video was released in June 2015 and was shot in the band's hometown of Ithaca, New York. It depicts several people with disabilities working to overcome their challenges such as boxing, walking on hands, and swinging their arms on rings. It had a personal aspect to it because band member Casey Harris has been blind since birth. "We wanted to make it emotional and personal — and that's as personal as it gets for me, Casey and the band," Sam Harris stated.

== Commercial performance ==
"Renegades" was a commercial success in the United States, peaking at number 17 on the Billboard Hot 100. It topped several other Billboard charts: Alternative Airplay, where it led for 11 weeks; Adult Top 40, where it led for one week; Rock Airplay, where it led for 18 weeks; and the multi-metric Hot Rock & Alternative Songs chart, where it led for two weeks. It also reached number two on Adult Alternative Airplay, number eight on Mainstream Top 40, number ten on Adult Contemporary, and number 31 on Dance/Mix Show Airplay.

In February 2021, for the 25th anniversary of Adult Alternative Airplay, Billboard published a ranking of the 100 most successful songs in the chart's history; "Renegades" was placed at number 78. Billboard would later rank "Renegades" as the 44th-biggest hit in the history of Alternative Airplay in September 2023, for that chart's 35th anniversary.

== Charts ==
=== Weekly charts ===
Chart (2015–2016)	Peak position
Australia (ARIA)	43
Austria (Ö3 Austria Top 40)	25
Belgium (Ultratop 50 Flanders)	6
Belgium (Ultratop 50 Wallonia)	21
Canada Hot 100 (Billboard)	6
Canada AC (Billboard)	1
Canada CHR/Top 40 (Billboard)	5
Canada Hot AC (Billboard)	1
Canada Rock (Billboard)	1
Czech Republic Airplay (ČNS IFPI)	2
Czech Republic Singles Digital (ČNS IFPI)	9
France (SNEP)	10
Germany (GfK)	10
Hungary (Stream Top 40)	27
Iceland (RÚV)	11
Ireland (IRMA)	65
Italy (FIMI)	4
Mexico Ingles Airplay (Billboard)	31
Netherlands (Dutch Top 40)	17
Netherlands (Single Top 100)	32
Poland Airplay (ZPAV)	1
Scottish Singles Sales (Official Charts)	14
Slovakia Airplay (ČNS IFPI)	5
Slovenia (SloTop50)	6
Spain (Promusicae)	31
Sweden (Sverigetopplistan)	70
Switzerland (Schweizer Hitparade)	2
UK Singles (Official Charts)	38
US Billboard Hot 100	17
US Hot Rock & Alternative Songs (Billboard)	1
US Adult Contemporary (Billboard)	10
US Adult Pop Airplay (Billboard)	1
US Pop Airplay (Billboard)	8
US Rock & Alternative Airplay (Billboard)	1

=== Year-end charts ===
Chart (2015)	Position
Canada (Canadian Hot 100)	21
France (SNEP)	103
Italy (FIMI)	33
US Billboard Hot 100	54
US Hot Rock Songs (Billboard)	5
US Adult Contemporary (Billboard)	47
US Adult Top 40 (Billboard)	16
US Rock Airplay (Billboard)	1

Chart (2016)	Position
Belgium (Ultratop Flanders)	84
Belgium (Ultratop Wallonia)	53
Canada (Canadian Hot 100)	71
France (SNEP)	164
Germany (Official German Charts)	71
Netherlands (Dutch Top 40)	81
Poland (ZPAV)	30
Slovenia (SloTop50)	8
Switzerland (Schweizer Hitparade)	31
US Hot Rock Songs (Billboard)	12
US Adult Contemporary (Billboard)	25
US Adult Top 40 (Billboard)	49
US Rock Airplay (Billboard)	20

=== Decade-end charts ===
Chart (2010–2019)	Position
US Hot Rock Songs (Billboard)	33

== Certifications ==
Region	Certification	Certified units/sales
Australia (ARIA)	Platinum	70,000^{‡}
Belgium (BRMA)	Gold	10,000^{‡}
Brazil (Pro-Música Brasil)	Gold	30,000^{‡}
Canada (Music Canada)	7× Platinum	560,000^{‡}
Denmark (IFPI Danmark)	Gold	45,000^{‡}
France (SNEP)	Platinum	200,000^{‡}
Germany (BVMI)	Platinum	400,000^{‡}
Italy (FIMI)	4× Platinum	200,000^{‡}
New Zealand (RMNZ)	2× Platinum	60,000^{‡}
Poland (ZPAV)	3× Platinum	60,000^{‡}
Spain (Promusicae)	Platinum	60,000^{‡}
Sweden (GLF)	Platinum	40,000^{‡}
United Kingdom (BPI)	Platinum	600,000^{‡}
United States (RIAA)	4× Platinum	1,000,000
^{‡} Sales+streaming figures based on certification alone.

== Release history ==
Region	Date	Format	Version	Label
Worldwide	March 3, 2015	Digital download	Original	KidinaKorner; Geffen; Interscope
United States	September 1, 2015	Contemporary hit radio	Original	KidinaKorner; Geffen; Interscope
United States	September 25, 2015	Digital download	Remixes	KidinaKorner; Geffen; Interscope
Germany	February 12, 2016	CD	Single	Universal
