= Townie (album) =

2024 studio album by X Ambassadors

Studio album by X Ambassadors
- Released: April 5, 2024
- Studio: The Outlier Inn, Catskill, New York
- Length: 47:06 (Physical release); 57:58 (Digital re-release)
- Label: Virgin; Nyle
- Producer: X Ambassadors

X Ambassadors chronology
| The Beautiful Liar (2021) | Townie (2024) | Townies (2024) |

Singles from Townie
- 1. "No Strings" Released: January 19, 2024; 2. "Your Town" Released: February 16, 2024; 3. "Half-Life" Released: March 15, 2024; 4. "Follow the Sound of My Voice" Released: March 29, 2024

Townie is the fourth studio album by American rock band X Ambassadors, released on April 5, 2024. It follows their third studio album The Beautiful Liar (2021) and was their first release through Virgin Records and Nyle Music Group. The album revolves around band members Sam and Casey Harris' childhood living in Ithaca, New York and growing into adulthood. Stylistically, it deviates heavily from the electronic sound of The Beautiful Liar with a more stripped back sound incorporating acoustic guitar-led melodies. The band embarked on the Townie Tour in promotion of the album.

A follow up EP Townies was released on October 18, 2024, which features four new tracks written prior to and during the Townie studio sessions.

== Background ==
The genesis for the creation of the album stemmed from Todd Peterson, childhood music teacher and mentor of Sam and Casey Harris, who died in 2021. After returning to Ithaca for the first time in many years, the band began recording and producing the album with most songs being already written. It is also the first album self-produced by the band.

== Singles ==
"No Strings" was released as the lead single from Townie on January 19, 2024, alongside the announcement of the album. A snippet of the demo of the song was released on the band's YouTube channel on January 2, 2023. As the closer of the album, it describes the notion that you cannot escape from who you really are.

"Your Town" was released as the second single on February 16, 2024. The song is dedicated to the Harris' childhood music teacher and mentor Todd Peterson, who died in 2021. It also contains a voicemail Sam Harris received from Peterson weeks before his death.

"Half-Life" was released as the third single on March 15, 2024. It is a love song dedicated to Sam Harris' wife.

"Follow the Sound of My Voice" was released as the fourth and final single on March 29, 2024. The song describes Casey Harris' blindness and his family's relationship with it as he grew up.

== Critical reception ==
Townie received positive reviews from critics. Matt Collar of AllMusic gave the album a 4 out of 5 star rating and wrote that "X Ambassadors may have left Ithaca in search of greater glory, but Townie shows just how much they've carried their hometown and its people with them on the way". He praised the songs "Sunoco", "Your Town", and "Follow the Sound of My Voice".

== Track listing ==
All tracks are written by Sam Harris, Casey Harris, Adam Levin, and Russ Flynn. All tracks are produced by X Ambassadors. Additional writers and producers are included below.

Townie track listing
| No. | Title | Writer(s) | Producer(s) | Length |
|---|---|---|---|---|
| 1. | "Sunoco" | | | 4:33 |
| 2. | "Smoke on the Highway" | | | 4:13 |
| 3. | "Your Town" | | | 5:06 |
| 4. | "I'm Not Really Here" | | | 3:18 |
| 5. | "Rashad" | | | 3:47 |
| 6. | "First Dam" ( (Note: "First Dam" is stylized as "(first dam)")) | | | 2:30 |
| 7. | "Fallout" | | | 3:18 |
| 8. | "Women's Jeans" | Henry Was | Was | 3:07 |
| 9. | "Half-Life" | Bren Stennis; Joy Williams | | 3:13 |
| 10. | "Follow the Sound of My Voice" | | | 5:50 |
| 11. | "Start a Band" | | | 4:33 |
| 12. | "No Strings" | Jacob Kasher Hindlin; Ricky Reed; Tobias Wincorn | Wincorn | 3:33 |
| Total length: | | | | 47:06 |

== Personnel ==
X Ambassadors
- Sam Nelson Harris
- Casey Harris
- Adam Levin
- Russ Flynn (touring member)
Production
- X Ambassadors – executive production, production
- Michael Freeman – mixing engineer
- Joe LaPorta – mastering engineer

== Townies EP ==
Townies

EP by X Ambassadors
- Released: October 18, 2024
- Length: 10:52
- Label: Virgin; Nyle
- Producer: Sam Nelson Harris; Andrew Wells; Saint Kid

X Ambassadors chronology
| Townie (2024) | Townies (2024) | VHS(X) (2025) |

Singles from Townies
- 1. "Fragile" Released: October 18, 2024

Following the release of the album and its respective tour the band began teasing new material on their Instagram page with snippets of a new song named "Fragile."

"Fragile" would be released as the lead single on October 18, 2024, alongside three new tracks for the band's sixth EP Townies serving as a companion piece to Townie. The band described it as the sonic bridge between The Beautiful Liar and Townie with it being written prior and during the band's recording of their fourth album.

The EP would be integrated to the beginning of the original album on digital re-releases.

=== Track listing ===
Townies EP track listing
| No. | Title | Writer(s) | Producer(s) | Length |
|---|---|---|---|---|
| 1. | "Upstate Boys" | Sam Harris | S. Harris | 2:30 |
| 2. | "Drive" | S. Harris; Casey Harris; Adam Levin; Andrew Wells; Sean Douglas | Wells | 2:59 |
| 3. | "Fragile" | S. Harris; C. Harris; Levin; Wells; Anthony Rossomando | | 3:03 |
| 4. | "Sticks and Stones" (with Rowan Drake and Saint Kid) | S. Harris; Drake; Kii Kinsella | Saint Kid; S. Harris | 2:18 |
| Total length: | | | | 10:52 |
