= Jamie N. Commons =

English singer-songwriter (born 1988)

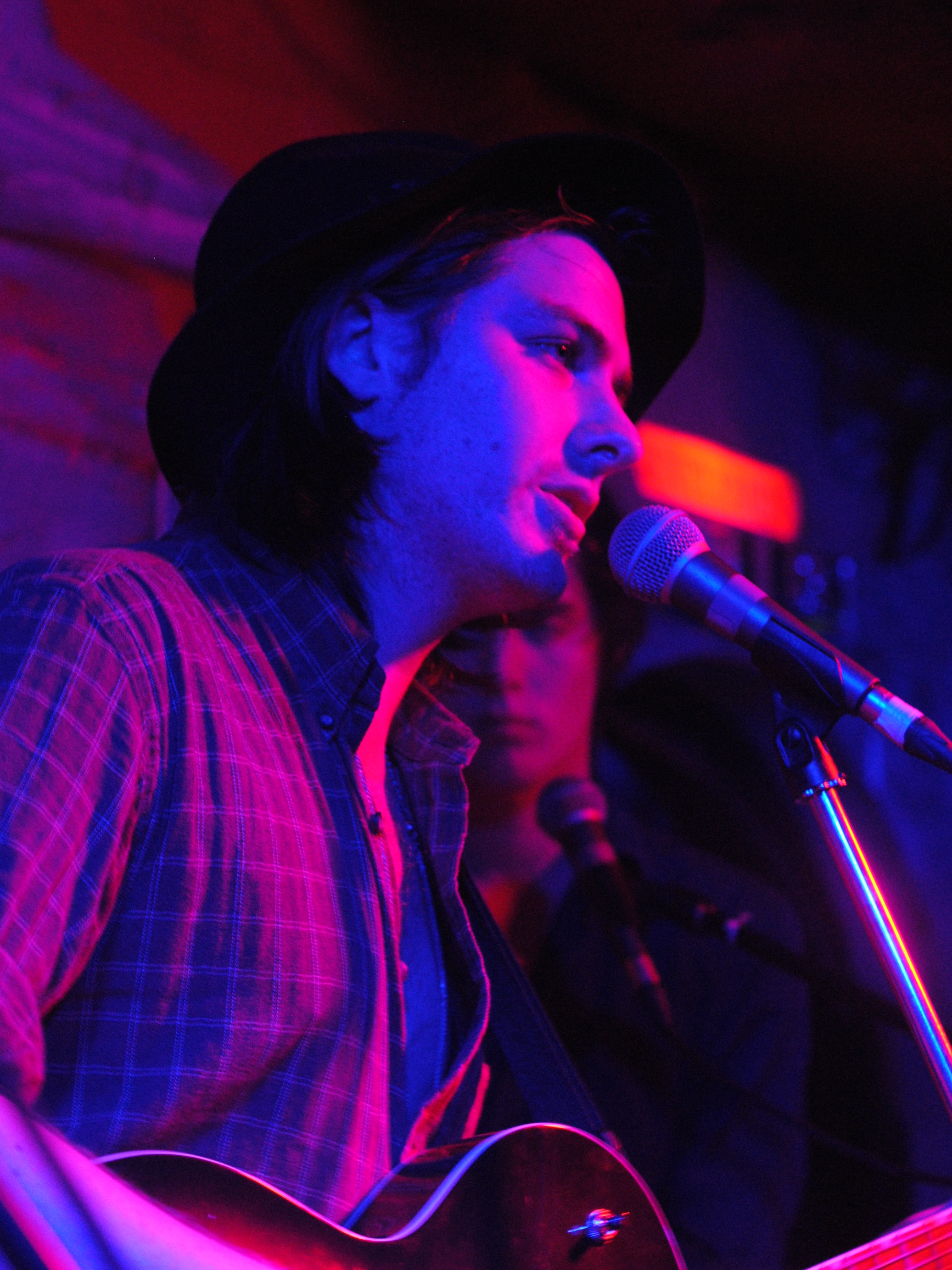

Background information
- Born: James Nicholas Commons; 22 October 1988 (age 38); Bristol, England
- Origin: New Cross, London, England
- Genres: Blues rock; folk; country; alternative rock
- Occupations: Singer; songwriter
- Instruments: Vocals; guitar
- Years active: 2011–present
- Labels: Interscope; KIDinaKORNER; Fiction

James Nicholas Commons (born 22 October 1988) is a British singer and songwriter, based in New Cross, London.

== Early life and education ==
Commons was born in Bristol, England, but was raised, in part, in Chicago, Illinois, United States. At age six, Commons' family moved to Chicago, which would lead to his appreciation of American blues, folk and swamp rock music, and of artists, notable among which are The Allman Brothers Band.

Commons returned to the English West Country at the age of 16.

Aged 18, Commons relocated to London and commenced reading classical music at Goldsmiths College, alongside contemporaries including James Blake and Katy B.

== Career ==
His second EP, Rumble and Sway, was released in March 2013 with Interscope, produced by Alex da Kid, who early signed him to his label KIDinaKORNER. The title song would later be used in the trailer for the Coen Brothers film Hail, Caesar!, season three of American supernatural teen drama television series Teen Wolf and season three of American legal drama television series Suits as well as making appearances in commercials for Levi's in 2014 and for Butterfinger in 2020.

In June 2013, Commons opened for Bruce Springsteen in Nijmegen.

He is featured on Eminem's eighth studio album The Marshall Mathers LP 2, in the track "Desperation" which is only included in the deluxe edition bonus disc.

His song with X Ambassadors, "Jungle", is featured in the trailers for Season 2 of Orange Is the New Black, the video game Battlefield Hardline, season 4 of American supernatural teen drama television series Teen Wolf and the film Pitch Perfect 2. In addition, the song also appeared in the advertisements for Beats by Dre, which ran during the 2014 FIFA World Cup in Brazil, and the film Horrible Bosses 2. WWE used the song in the commercial for WWEShop.com and as the theme song for the PPV WWE Battleground. "Jungle" played in the end credits for the 2014 film Hercules as well as Project Almanac and the Hitman: Agent 47. This song also plays during an end scene in the TV series The Blacklist. The most recent version of Jungle has been used by Boston, American beer company Sam Adams for their beer.

He is also featured on Big K.R.I.T.'s second studio album Cadillactica, in the track "Saturdays = Celebration." This song is featured in the Sicario - 'Welcome to Juarez' Trailer.

His track 'Not Gonna Break Me' was used in the BBC's trailer for the 2016 Summer Olympics.

He wrote and produced the title track for the film Skyscraper.

In 2018, he started a project called "The Fever Dreams", a series of singles released leading up to his debut studio album scheduled for release in 2019.

In 2019 Commons co-wrote "Hold Me While You Wait" the lead single to Lewis Capaldi's debut album Divinely Uninspired to a Hellish Extent, which debuted at #1 on the UK Album chart and went on to achieve Gold status after just 8 days. In May that year, he covered Soul Asylum's Runaway Train along with fellow artists Skylar Grey and Gallant in collaboration with National Center for Missing and Exploited Children.

Commons co-wrote "Testify", the lead track of Conrad Sewell's album "Life" was released the same week, this album debuted at #1 on the Australian charts.

== Artistry ==
=== Voice ===
Commons' baritone vocals, influenced by Gregg Allman, are notable for their authenticity of the blues genre, reflected through his Americanised accent and deep, "raspy" and "gritty" singing voice, earning him comparisons with Tom Waits, Johnny Cash, Leonard Cohen, Nick Cave, Greg Dulli and Mark Lanegan.

=== Influences ===
In a BBC America interview, Commons said The Allman Brothers Band, the soundtrack for O Brother, Where Art Thou? and Moby's Play were important, early influences.

== Personal life ==
During his childhood, Commons attended church with his religious mother, while his father, an atheist, stayed at home. These experiences informed him of religion, which is a theme explored in his music.

== Discography ==
=== EPs ===
- The Baron (2011)
- Rumble and Sway (2013)
- Jamie N Commons (2016)
- Fever Dreams (2019)

=== Singles ===
- "Devil in Me" (2012)
- "Rumble and Sway" (2013) #163 SNEP French Singles Chart
- "Jungle" with X Ambassadors (2013) #87 Billboard Hot 100
- "Immigrant Song" (Led Zeppelin cover) (2014) on Game of Thrones Season 4 OST
- "Karma (Hardline)" (2014) on Battlefield Hardline OST
- "Marathon" (2015)
- "Let's Do It Till We Get It Right" (2016)
- "Paper Dreams" (2018)
- "Won't Let Go" (2019)
- "Runaway Train" (with Skylar Grey featuring Gallant) (2019)
- "Start Again" (2019)
- "Heartbreak" (2019)
- "Feels Like Forever" (with Kygo) (2020)

=== Music videos ===
- "Devil in Me" (2012)
- "Rumble and Sway" (2013) #163 SNEP French Singles Chart
- "Jungle" with X Ambassadors (2013) #87 Billboard Hot 100
- "Immigrant Song" (Led Zeppelin cover) (2014) on Game of Thrones Season 4 OST
- "Karma (Hardline)" (2014) on Battlefield Hardline OST
- "Marathon" (2015)
- "Let's Do It Till We Get It Right" (2016)
- "Paper Dreams" (2018)
- "Won't Let Go" (2019)
- "Runaway Train" with Skylar Grey featuring Gallant (2019)
- "Start Again" (2019)
- "Heartbreak" (2019)

=== Other appearances ===
- "Lead Me Home" on The Walking Dead: Original Soundtrack – Vol. 1 (2013)
- "Rumble and Sway" in Teen Wolf 3x01 (2013), Suits 3x02 (2013), The Catch 1x02 (2016) and the official trailer for Hail, Caesar! (2016)
- "Marathon" in FIFA 14 OST (2013)
- ”‘TV Now’ ft. Ellie Goulding” in The CW promo (2013)
- "Desperation" on Eminem's The Marshall Mathers LP 2 (2013)
- "Saturdays = Celebration" on Big K.R.I.T.'s Cadillactica (2014)
- "Jungle" in Teen Wolf Season 4x01 and end credits for Hercules (2014)
- "All Along the Watchtower" in Need for Speed (2014)
- "The Preacher" in Justified Season 6x07 (2015)
- "In My Arms" Grizfolk (2017)
- "Walls" in Skyscraper End credits (2018)
- "Gallows" the Score ft. Jamie N Commons Carry On (2020)
