= X Ambassadors =

American rock band

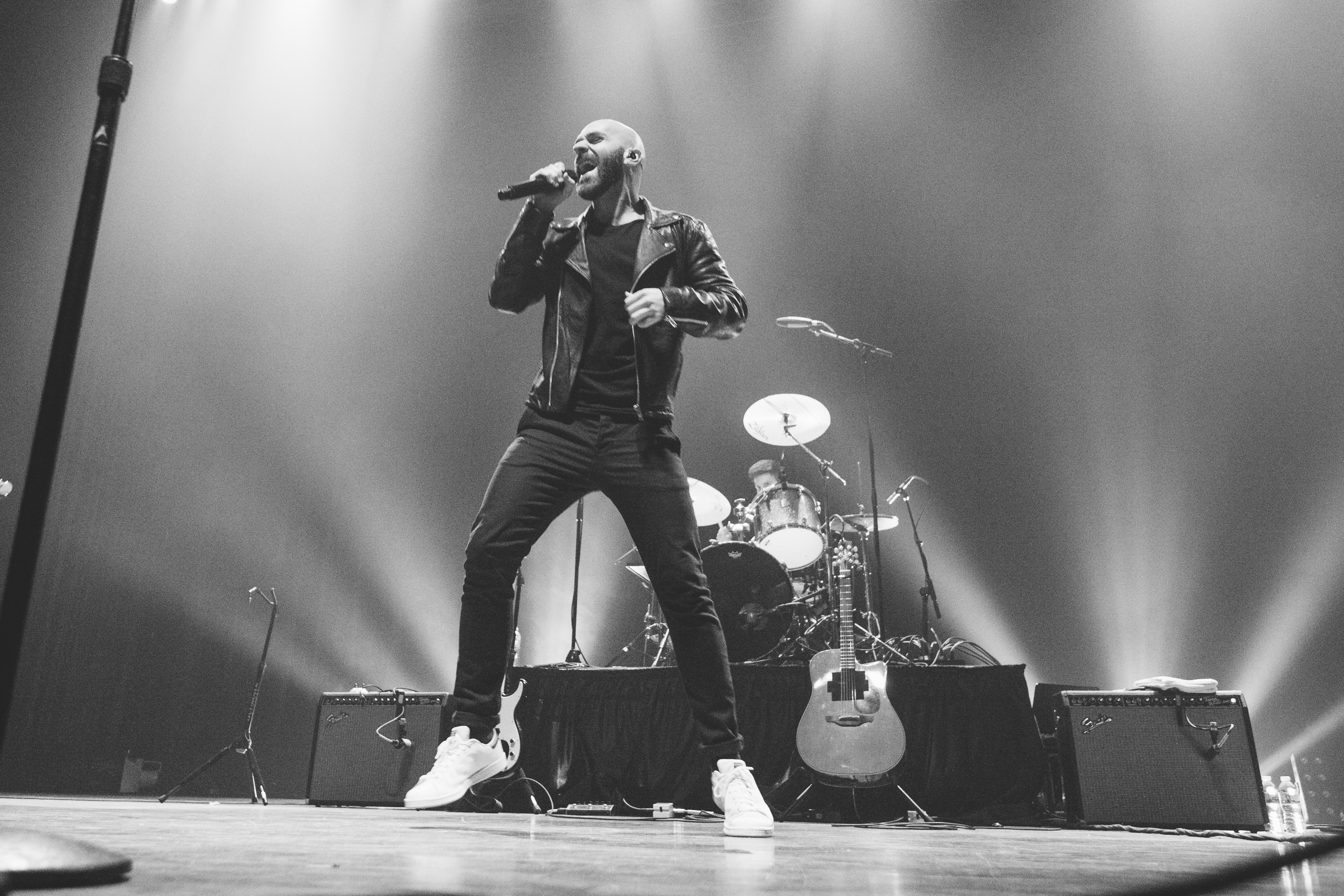
- X Ambassadors performing in 2015

Background information
- Also known as: The Blind Boys of New York (2009); Ambassadors (2009–2013); XA
- Origin: Ithaca, New York, United States
- Genres: Alternative rock; indie rock; indie pop; pop rock; alternative pop
- Years active: 2009–present
- Labels: FLG; Nyle; Virgin; Geffen; Interscope; KIDinaKORNER
- Members: Sam Nelson Harris; Casey Harris; Adam Levin
- Past members: Noah Feldshuh
- Website: xambassadors.com

X Ambassadors, also stylized XA, is an American pop rock band from Ithaca, New York, that consists of lead vocalist Sam Harris, keyboardist Casey Harris, and drummer Adam Levin. Russ Flynn is a touring member who plays guitar and bass. Their most notable songs include "Jungle", "Renegades", and "Unsteady". The band's debut full-length album, VHS, was released on June 30, 2015. Their second album, Orion, came out on June 14, 2019. Their third album, The Beautiful Liar, was issued on September 24, 2021. Their fourth album, Townie, came out on April 5, 2024.

== History ==
=== 2009–2012: Ambassadors and Litost ===
X Ambassadors began playing under the name Ambassadors, touring with artists such as Lights. During this time, they self-released their debut EP, Ambassadors, creating a music video for its lead single, "Tropisms." Shortly after, they self-released their debut LP, Litost, which included the eponymous song, later to be used in the soundtrack for The Host. The band signed a record deal in 2012 with SONGS Music Publishing. They launched a Kickstarter campaign to fund and shoot two music videos for the LP's singles, "Weight/Lightness" and "Unconsolable", with the latter being re-recorded later. The group was noticed by Imagine Dragons while frontman Dan Reynolds was sick in the hospital in Norfolk, Virginia. Reynolds heard an acoustic version of "Unconsolable" on 96X WROX-FM and asked Interscope to sign the band as soon as possible.

=== 2013–2014: Love Songs Drug Songs and The Reason ===
X Ambassadors released their debut major-label EP, Love Songs Drug Songs, in 2013. It included the track "Stranger", co-written by Dan Reynolds. In promotion of the album, they toured in support of Imagine Dragons, Jimmy Eat World, and the Mowgli's. In 2014, the band released their next EP, The Reason. Two of its tracks, "Unsteady" and "Jungle", appeared on their full-length album VHS, released after a year. In promotion of the new EP, X Ambassadors supported Panic! at the Disco and Imagine Dragons on their respective tours.

=== 2015–2017: VHS ===
In March 2015, X Ambassadors released the single "Renegades", which appeared on their debut album, VHS, published on June 30, 2015, and featuring collaborations with Jamie N Commons and Imagine Dragons. A special edition, titled VHS 2.0 was released on June 10, 2016, with five additional tracks and without the interludes that were included on the original version.

The band collaborated with the Knocks on the song "Comfortable", from the duo's debut album, 55, released in March 2016. They were also featured on the song "Sucker for Pain" from the soundtrack to the 2016 film Suicide Squad.

On June 20, 2016, X Ambassadors announced that Feldshuh would be taking an indefinite hiatus from the band to deal with personal issues.

X Ambassadors released four standalone singles in 2017: "Hoping" in March, "Torches" in April, "The Devil You Know" in June, and "Ahead of Myself" in July. They also performed at the 2017 National Scout Jamboree. The band was featured in a song by Eminem titled "Bad Husband", from his album Revival. They also collaborated on "Home", a song from the soundtrack for the Netflix film Bright. The track includes pop singer Bebe Rexha and rapper Machine Gun Kelly.

=== 2018–2020: Joyful, Orion, and Belong ===
X Ambassadors released their next single, "Joyful", on January 26, 2018, originally intended to be the title track of their second record. Pre-orders of the album became available through their website later that day, and it was slated for an April 2018 release. On February 2, 2018, the band issued another single, titled "Don't Stay".

On January 24, 2019, the group put out their next single, "Boom". Three months later, on April 19, 2019, over a year after the announcement of Joyful, the band stated they had cancelled it in favor of new material for a different record, to be titled Orion, which would include the previously released track "Boom". Vocalist Sam Harris stated that Joyful was the second iteration of their second album and that they felt like the songs on it did not represent where they were at. That same day, the band issued the song "Hey Child" as the second single off Orion. A third single, titled "Hold You Down", was published on May 31, 2019. The album came out on June 14, 2019.

On April 19, 2019, American rapper and singer Lizzo released her album Cuz I Love You, which featured the tracks "Cuz I Love You", "Jerome", and "Heaven Help Me", all co-written and produced by X Ambassadors. The band also wrote the song "Baptize Me" with singer Jacob Banks for the Game of Thrones compilation For the Throne.

On August 16, 2019, X Ambassadors were featured on a song titled "In Your Arms", from Illenium's third studio album, Ascend.

On August 23, 2019, the band released a politically charged standalone single called "Optimistic", which centers around gun violence in the United States.

On February 7, 2020, they issued the song "Everything Sounds Like a Love Song", promoted as the lead single from their forthcoming EP, Belong. On February 21, 2020, the band put out a single titled "Great Unknown" for the film The Call of the Wild.

Belong came out on March 6, 2020, and included the title track as well as "Everything Sounds Like a Love Song" and "Happy Home". Sam Harris stated that it was a collection of tracks the band wrote that didn't quite fit on their upcoming third studio album, but they loved the songs and wanted to put them out. On May 15, 2020, X Ambassadors released another single, "Zen", with K.Flay and Grandson, about the COVID-19 pandemic.

=== 2021–2022: (Eg), The Beautiful Liar ===
On January 14, 2021, X Ambassadors released a single called "ultraviolet.tragedies", a heavily rap-focused song featuring Terrell Hines. It was the first single from the collaborations project (Eg). Sam Harris said that with this project, he wanted to "give a voice to (several) incredible artists that people may not have heard yet, and really let their imagination be at the forefront of everything". On February 7, 2021, the band released a cover of "Blinding Lights" by the Weeknd.

On February 12, 2021, they released the next single from (Eg), "skip.that.party", featuring Jensen McRae. They issued one more single, "torture", on March 12, 2021, featuring Earl St. Clair.

On June 11, 2021, the band put out a song titled "My Own Monster", which was also announced to be the lead single from their third studio album, The Beautiful Liar. "Okay" was released as the second single on July 30, 2021, while "Adrenaline" came out on August 13, 2021. The album was published on September 24, 2021, along with a music video for the song "Beautiful Liar". A tour for the record began in October. The Beautiful Liar is a concept album that plays out similarly to a radio drama, telling the story of a blind girl whose shadow comes to life. Sam and Casey said that the album was influenced by radio shows that they listened to as children. It has a trap-influenced sound, a contrast from the band's previous releases, and tells its story over the course of 16 tracks. About the record, Sam said, "I wanted to make an album that felt as unhinged as I did, and as the whole world felt around me. So Adam, Casey and I carved ourselves a space where we could all be as ugly, weird, funny, and f'd up as we wanted to be."

On October 22, 2021, the band released "Water", a song for the Blade Runner: Black Lotus soundtrack. The band was featured on "You'll Get Yours" from Tom Morello's album The Atlas Underground Flood, released December 3, 2021. On May 12, 2022, they issued a remix of their song "Palo Santo", featuring ROBI.

On December 9, 2022, the band collaborated with Belgian DJ Lost Frequencies and singer Elley Duhé on "Back to You". A music video for the song was released on January 19, 2023. A deluxe pack was released on March 10, 2023, containing remixes from various DJs.

=== 2023–present: (Eg) season two, Townie, Townies, VHS(X) ===
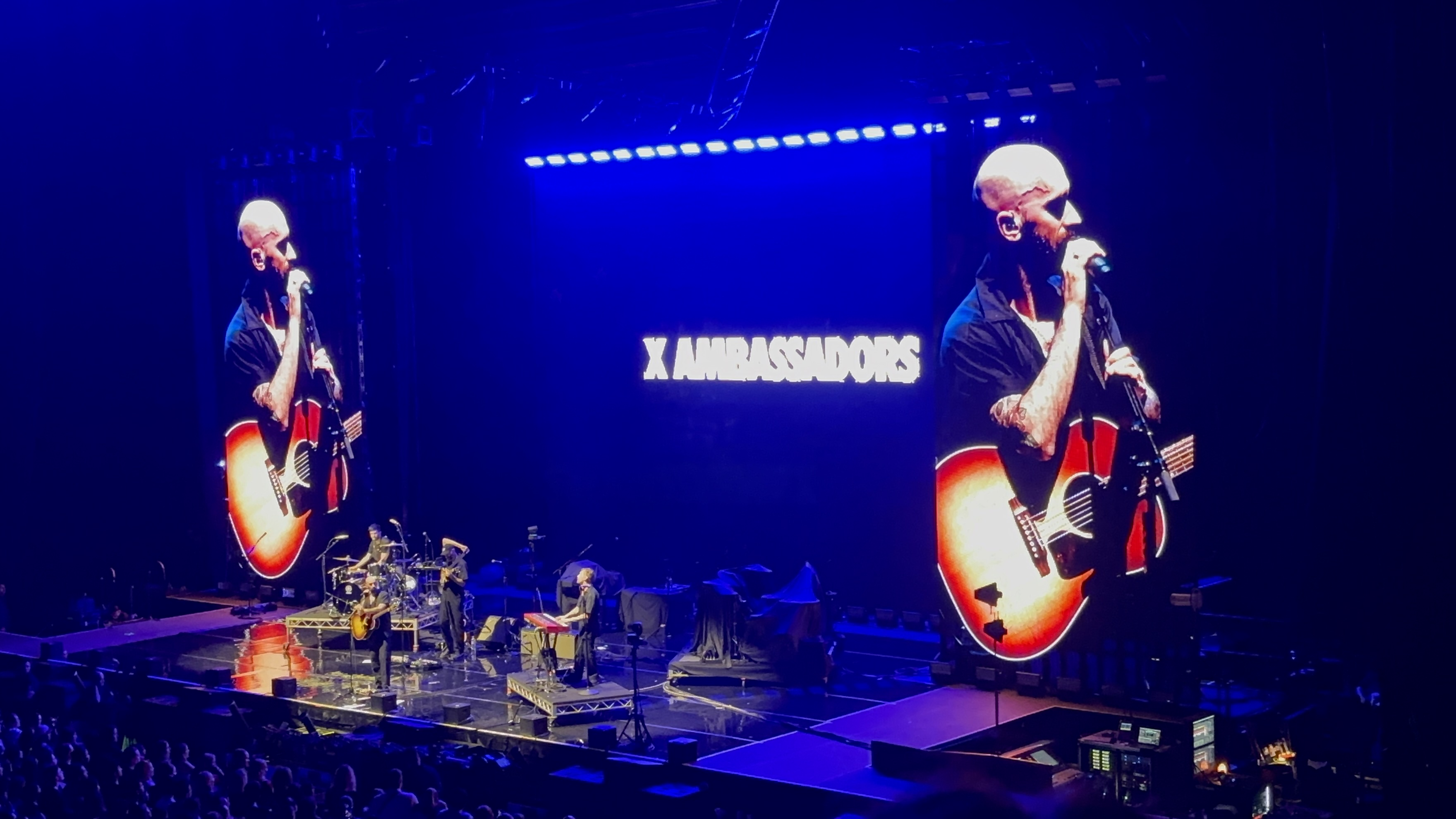
X Ambassadors performing in Sydney, Australia, in January 2025

On May 24, 2023, X Ambassadors released "Happy People", featuring Teddy Swims and Jac Ross, starting season two of (Eg). The next single, released on June 23, was "Friend for Life", featuring Medium Build, followed by "Devastation", featuring PAMÉ, released on September 22, and "Alcohol", featuring Breland, released on October 27.

On November 17, 2023, the band put out the song "Deep End", for the soundtrack to Aquaman and the Lost Kingdom.

In late 2023, X Ambassadors began teasing snippets of songs from their upcoming fourth studio album, Townie. The record, published on April 5, 2024, was preceded by four singles: "No Strings", released on January 19, 2024; "Your Town", released on February 16, 2024; "Half-Life", released on March 15, 2024; and "Follow the Sound of My Voice", released on March 29, 2024. The band released the EP Townies alongside the single "Fragile" on October 15.

In January 2025, X Ambassadors opened for the Script on the Australian leg of their Satellites World Tour.

In July, the band announced that to celebrate the tenth anniversary of its release, they would be issuing a reimagined edition of their debut album, VHS, titled VHS(X). It came out on August 29, and the trio promoted it with a tour.

After going independent for their 2023-2025 releases, the band signed in 2026 with Frontiers Label Group's new partnership platform, NOIUS, and will release music under FLG Records. The band released their first single under FLG, "Y.O.T.H.," on October 30, 2026.

The band released the single "Y.O.T.H" (year of the horse) on October 30, 2026, alongside teasing their fifth studio album.

== Musical style and influences ==
X Ambassadors' musical style has been described as alternative rock, indie rock, pop rock, and alternative pop.

The band incorporates various genres into their songs, such as jazz, trap, and R&B. Sam Harris has stated that all of the members grew up listening to hip hop and R&B, but they also appreciated rock music, specifically alternative and indie groups. While writing their second album, he cited soul influences, including Ray Charles, Joe Cocker, Otis Redding, and the Band. It has often been noted that Casey Harris being blind has been a major part of shaping the band's music.

== Solo projects ==
On May 5, 2023, Sam Harris released his debut solo album, Why Does Everything Make Me Cry?, under the name Sam Nelson. It contains three singles: "Forever, Now", "Battery Acid", and "Give Me Hell", the latter featuring Madi Diaz.

== Philanthropy ==
In January 2017, Sam Harris participated in the official Women's March on Washington after-party. He was joined by the National, Ani DiFranco, Samantha Ronson, Sleater-Kinney, and many others.

In March 2017, X Ambassadors performed a special show to benefit Planned Parenthood on International Women's Day.

Following the benefit show, the band released the song "Hoping" on March 10. All proceeds from the song for the six months following its release were donated to the ACLU.

In June 2017, X Ambassadors announced that they would donate all the proceeds from their Mississippi Coast Coliseum Show to Unity Mississippi—an LGBT charitable organization, following the announcement that the state of Mississippi signed HB 1523 – the "Protecting Freedom of Conscience from Government Discrimination Act" into law.

== Band members ==
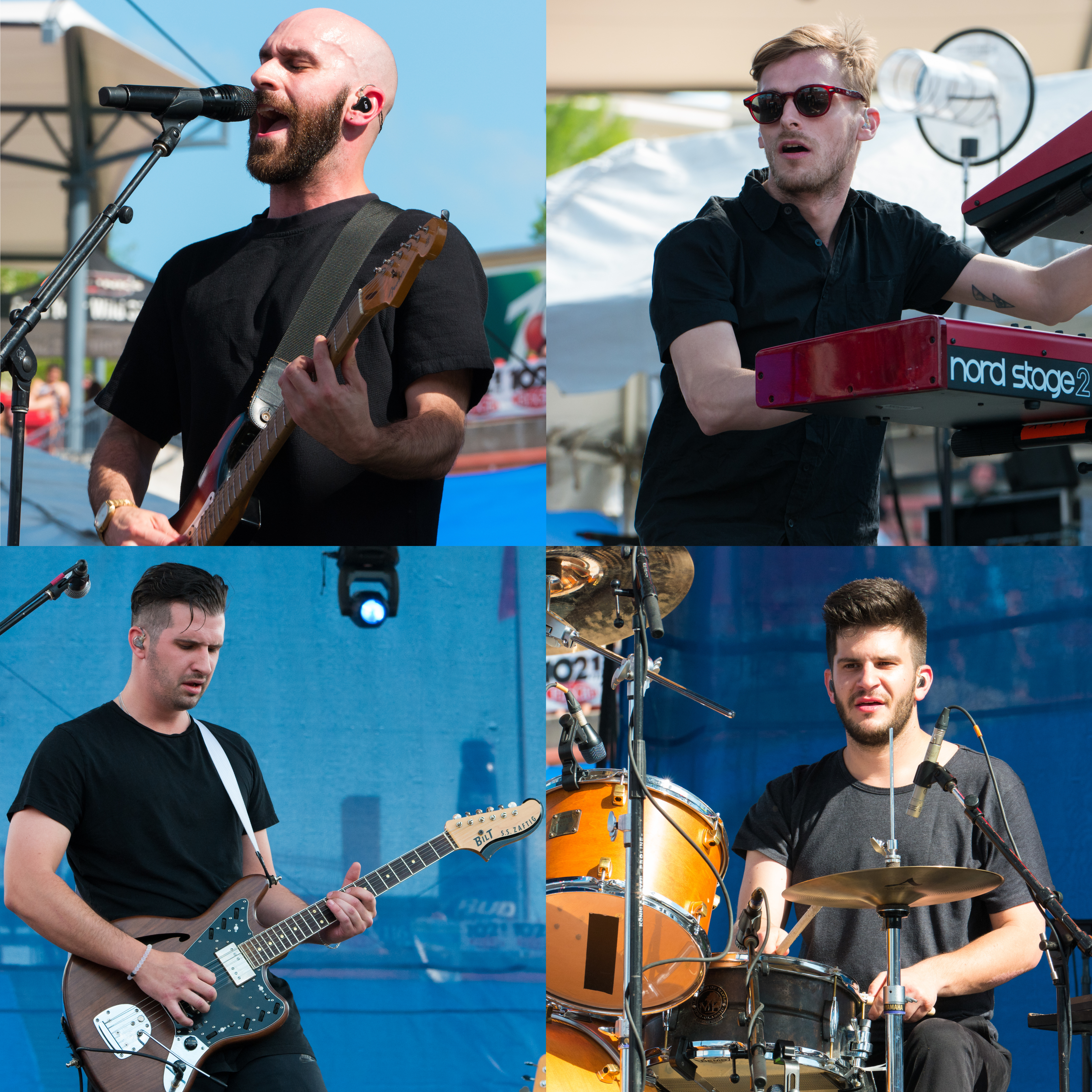
Clockwise from top left: Sam Harris, Casey Harris, Adam Levin, Noah Feldshuh, performing in 2016

- Sam Nelson Harris – lead vocals, guitar, saxophone, bass guitar, drums, percussion (2009–present)
- Casey Harris – piano, keyboards, backing vocals (2009–present)
- Adam Levin – drums, percussion (2009–present)

=== Touring member ===
- Russ Flynn – guitar, bass (2016–present)

=== Former member ===
- Noah Feldshuh – lead guitar, bass guitar, keyboards, backing vocals (2009–2016; currently on hiatus)

=== Member information ===
- Sam and Casey Harris are brothers. Their father, Rob Harris, is a unit publicist in the film industry. They have been friends with Feldshuh since kindergarten in Ithaca. Sam met Levin while attending the New School in New York City in 2006.
- Casey Harris has been blind since birth.
- Noah Feldshuh is the eldest son of playwright David Feldshuh and a nephew of actress Tovah Feldshuh.

== Discography ==
- VHS (2015)
- Orion (2019)
- The Beautiful Liar (2021)
- Townie (2024)

== Awards and nominations ==
Year	Award	Category	Work	Result	Ref.
2015	Teen Choice Awards	Choice Music: Rock Song	"Renegades"	Nominated	
2016	Hollywood Music in Media Awards	Best Song – Sci-Fi / Fantasy Film	"Sucker for Pain"	Nominated	
2016	iHeartRadio Music Awards	Alternative Rock Artist of the Year	X Ambassadors	Nominated	
2016	iHeartRadio Music Awards	Alternative Rock Song of the Year	"Renegades"	Nominated	
2016	Billboard Music Awards	Top Rock Artist	X Ambassadors	Nominated	
2016	Billboard Music Awards	Top Rock Song	"Renegades"	Nominated	
2016	American Music Awards	Favorite Artist – Alternative Rock	X Ambassadors	Nominated	
2017	Billboard Music Awards	Top Rock Artist	X Ambassadors	Nominated	
2017	Billboard Music Awards	Top Rock Song	"Sucker for Pain"	Nominated	
2017	Billboard Music Awards	Top Rock Song	"Unsteady"	Nominated	
2017	Teen Choice Awards	Choice Rock Artist	X Ambassadors	Nominated	
