= Alex da Kid =

British music producer (born 1983)

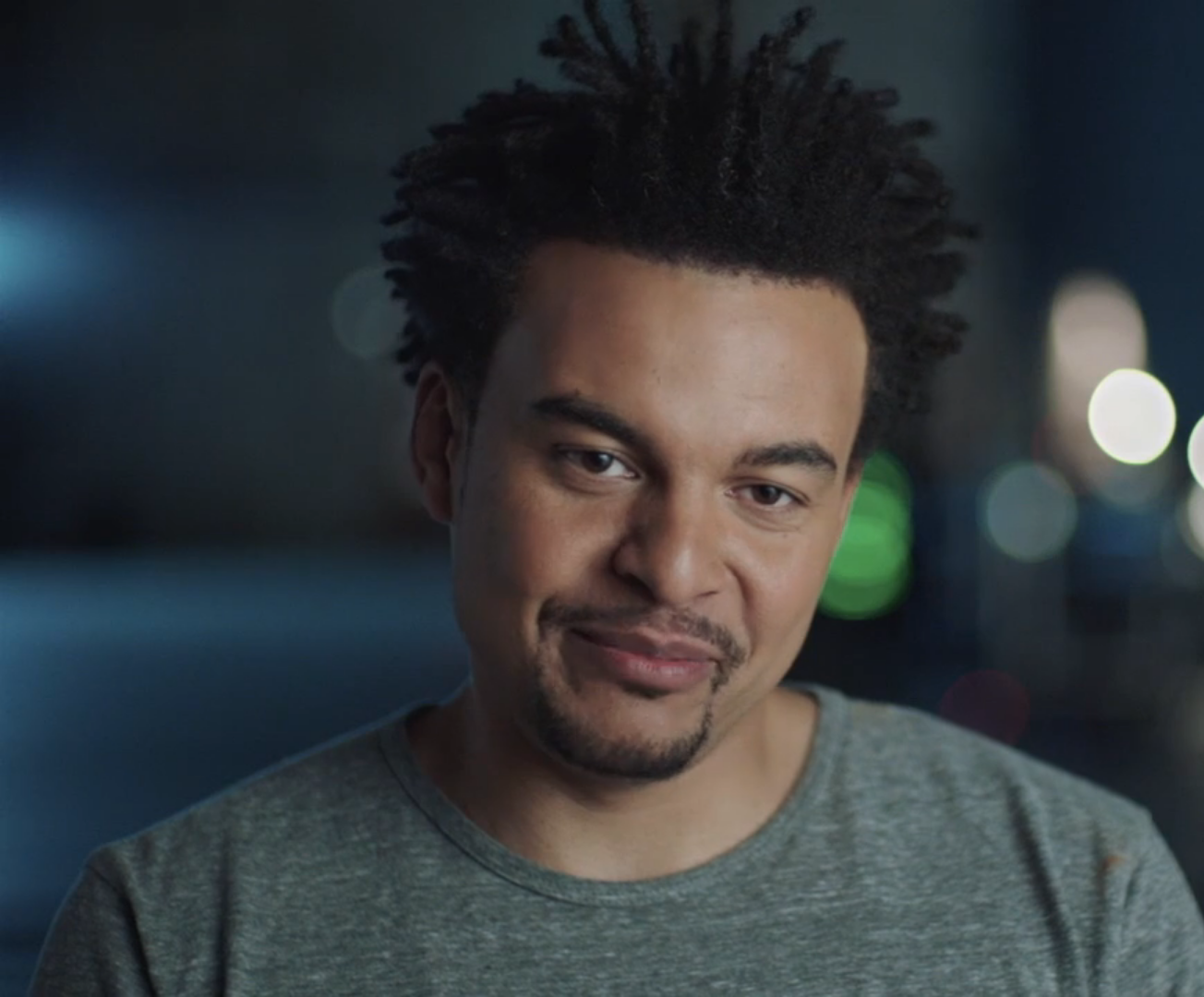
- Grant in 2016

Background information
- Also known as: Alex da Kidd; by.ALEXANDER
- Born: Alexander Junior Grant; 27 August 1983 (age 42); Bristol, England
- Origin: Wood Green, London, England
- Genres: Alternative rock; hip hop; jazz; pop; R&B
- Occupations: Record producer; songwriter; record executive
- Years active: 2008–present
- Labels: Kidinakorner; Interscope
- Publisher: Universal Music Publishing Group

Alexander Junior Grant (born 27 August 1983), known professionally as Alex da Kid or by.ALEXANDER, is a British music producer from Wood Green, London. He is known for his production work on songs for music industry artists, such as Dr. Dre ("I Need a Doctor"), Nicki Minaj ("Massive Attack"), B.o.B ("Airplanes" featuring Hayley Williams), Eminem ("Love the Way You Lie" featuring Rihanna), Matthew Koma ("Stars"), Diddy ("Coming Home" with Dirty Money featuring Skylar Grey), Imagine Dragons ("Radioactive" "Demons") and Cheryl ("Under The Sun"). His style is noted for its blending of pop, hip-hop and alternative rock.

The Evening Standard named him one of "London's Most Influential People in 2011." He has been nominated for numerous Grammy Awards including Album of the Year for his work on Rihanna's Loud. His record label, Kidinakorner, has been an imprint of Interscope Records since 2011. In both 2013 and 2014, Grant (as owner of Kidinakorner Records) was chosen by Billboard magazine for their "Top 40 Under 40." In 2020, Grant released a jazz album titled 000 CHANNEL BLACK, under the pseudonym by.ALEXANDER.

== Early life ==
Alexander Junior Grant was born 27 August 1983 in North London, to a Jamaican father and an English mother. Grant was a professional footballer, playing for Bristol City until 19 years of age, at which time a friend introduced him to the digital music editing software FruityLoops, prompting an interest in music production. He then attended University of West London (UWL) to study towards a master's degree in Audio Technology, now called Advanced Music Technology.

== Musical career ==
Universal Music Publishing Group's Jessica Rivera first heard about Grant in 2009 though Grant's lawyer Scott Felcher. On request, Grant sent Rivera some of his music, and the publishing executive later related her reactions to HitQuarters: "It hit me right away that this dude had something different to bring to the table ... He wasn't just straight up hip-hop – his sound was very different and transcended genres."

In 2011, Grant launched his record label, Kidinakorner. In 2012, he co-wrote and co-produced multiple songs for Christina Aguilera's seventh studio album Lotus.

In 2016, Grant released his first solo project as an artist. The single, "Not Easy" features X Ambassadors, Elle King and Wiz Khalifa via Kidinakorner/RCA Records. The track was written and produced by Alex da Kid for Kidinakorner, Sam Harris, Casey Harris, Adam Levin, Elle King, and Wiz Khalifa. In 2017, Grant released his second track, "American Funeral" which was a co-written collaboration with Joseph Angel.

In a Music Connection magazine cover story from January 2015, Grant said, as a producer, he co-writes everything that he works on with the artists.

On 27 August 2020, Grant released his first full-length project, a jazz album titled 000 CHANNEL BLACK, under the moniker by.ALEXANDER. The album features guest appearances from 070 Shake, Tanerélle, Charles Bukowski, Michèle Lamy, Rainsford and Irina Shayk.

== Other ventures ==
In 2020, Grant founded _by.ALEXANDER, his own luxury fashion label. His debut collection, called "000 CHANNEL BLACK", features a mix of one-off pieces and elevated sportswear styles. Actor Gary Busey and model Irina Shayk star in the first editorial campaign, kicking off the launch. Designed and developed in Los Angeles by Grant himself, the unisex 19-piece collection is full of contrasting details and juxtapositions.

== Discography ==
=== Studio albums ===
List of studio albums
Title	Album details
000 CHANNEL BLACK	Released: 27 August 2020; Label: by.ALEXANDER, Blue Note, UMG; Formats: CD, digital download, streaming
MEMORIES FOR SALE ---AT---> 66 GREENE ST SOHO NY	Released: 8 November 2024; Label: by.ALEXANDER

=== Singles ===
Title	Year	Album
"Not Easy" (Alex da Kid featuring X Ambassadors, Elle King and Wiz Khalifa)	2016	non-album singles
"American Funeral" (Alex da Kid and Joseph Angel)	2017	non-album singles
"Go 2.0" (Alex da Kid featuring Jorja Smith, H.E.R. and Rapsody)	2018	non-album singles
"Trumpets" (by.ALEXANDER featuring 070 Shake)	2020	000 CHANNEL BLACK
"le merveilleux résumé"	2020	000 CHANNEL BLACK

== Production discography ==
=== Singles produced ===
List of singles as either producer or co-producer, with selected chart positions and certifications, showing year released, performing artists and album name
Title	Year	Peak chart positions										Certifications	Album
Title	Year	US	US R&B	US Rap	AUS	CAN	FRA	GER	NZ	SWE	UK	Certifications	Album
"Massive Attack" (Nicki Minaj featuring Sean Garrett)	2010	122	65	—	—	—	—	—	—	—	—		non-album single
"Airplanes" (B.o.B featuring Hayley Williams of Paramore)	2010	2	65	2	2	2	89	8	1	10	1	RIAA: 4× Platinum; ARIA: 3× Platinum; BVMI: Gold; MC: 3× Platinum; BPI: Platinum; RIANZ: Platinum	B.o.B Presents: The Adventures of Bobby Ray
"Love the Way You Lie" (Eminem featuring Rihanna)	2010	1	1	1	1	1	1	1	1	1	2	RIAA: 11× Platinum (Diamond); ARIA: 9× Platinum; BPI: 2× Platinum; BVMI: Platinum; IFPI SWI: 3× Platinum; RIANZ: 2× Platinum	Recovery
"Coming Home" (Diddy-Dirty Money featuring Skylar Grey)	2010	11	83	21	4	7	8	4	5	26	4	RIAA: 2× Platinum; ARIA: 3× Platinum; BPI: Gold	Last Train to Paris
"I Need a Doctor" (Dr. Dre featuring Eminem and Skylar Grey)	2011	4	124	16	12	8	29	25	23	56	8	RIAA: 2× Platinum; BPI: Silver	non-album single
"Words I Never Said" (Lupe Fiasco featuring Skylar Grey)	2011	89	—	—	—	—	—	—	—	—	—		Lasers
"Rise Above 1" (Reeve Carney featuring Bono and The Edge)	2011	74	—	—	—	71	—	—	—	—	—		Spider-Man: Turn Off the Dark
"Dance Without You" (Skylar Grey)	2011	—	—	—	—	—	—	—	—	—	—		non-album singles
"Invisible" (Skylar Grey)	2011	—	—	—	—	—	—	86	—	—	63		non-album singles
"Invincible" (MGK featuring Ester Dean)	2011	108	—	—	—	—	—	—	—	—	—		Lace Up
"Under the Sun" (Cheryl)	2011	—	—	—	—	—	—	—	—	—	13		A Million Lights
"C'mon Let Me Ride" (Skylar Grey featuring Eminem)	2012	—	—	—	—	84	—	—	17	—	—		Don't Look Down
"Radioactive" (Imagine Dragons)	2012	3	—	—	6	5	28	4	4	1	12	RIAA: 10× Platinum (Diamond); ARIA: 4× Platinum; BPI: Platinum; BVMI: Platinum; IFPI SWE: 6× Platinum; IFPI SWI: Platinum; MC: 3× Platinum; RMNZ: 3× Platinum	Night Visions
"Demons" (Imagine Dragons)	2013	6	—	—	11	4	15	15	12	7	13	RIAA: 5× Platinum; ARIA: 2× Platinum; BPI: Silver; IFPI SWE: 4× Platinum; IFPI SWI: Gold; MC: Platinum; RMNZ: Platinum	Night Visions
"On Top of the World" (Imagine Dragons)	2013	79	—	—	10	43	35	13	10	40	34	ARIA: 3× Platinum; BPI: Silver; IFPI SWE: 2× Platinum; RMNZ: Platinum	Night Visions
"Final Warning" (Skylar Grey)	2013	—	—	—	—	—	—	—	—	—	—		Don't Look Down
"Monster" (Imagine Dragons)	2013	78	—	—	—	41	—	—	—	—	—		Smoke + Mirrors (Deluxe Edition)
"Jungle (Remix)" (X Ambassadors and Jamie N Commons featuring Jay Z)	2014	87	—	—	—	62	55	44	—	—	18		non-album single
"I Bet My Life" (Imagine Dragons)	2014	28	—	—	36	15	42	65	28	—	27	RIAA: Gold; MC: Platinum	Smoke + Mirrors
"Bed of Lies" (Nicki Minaj featuring Skylar Grey)	2014	62	19	—	7	41	134	—	13	11	73		The Pinkprint
"Gold" (Imagine Dragons)	2014	—	—	—	—	—	—	—	—	—	—		Smoke + Mirrors
"Burning Bridges" (Ludacris featuring Jason Aldean)	2014	—	—	—	—	—	—	—	—	—	—		Ludaversal
"American Oxygen" (Rihanna)	2015	78	—	—	65	59	25	39	—	11	71		non-album single
"Renegades" (X Ambassadors)	2015	17	—	—	43	6	10	10	—	70	38	ARIA: Gold; MC: 4× Platinum; SNEP: Gold; BVMI: Gold; BPI: Silver; RIAA: Platinum	VHS
"Unsteady" (X Ambassadors)	2015	20	—	—	94	61	—	—	—	—	—	MC: Platinum; RIAA: 2× Platinum	VHS
"Sucker for Pain" (Lil Wayne, Wiz Khalifa, Imagine Dragons, Logic, Ty Dolla Sign and X Ambassadors)	2016	15	3	—	7	19	18	8	5	9	11	ARIA: Platinum; SNEP: Gold; RMNZ: Gold; BPI: Silver; RIAA: 2× Platinum	Suicide Squad
"Not Easy" (Alex da Kid featuring X Ambassadors, Elle King and Wiz Khalifa)	2016	—	—	—	73	—	—	—	—	—	—		non-album singles
"American Funeral" (Alex da Kid and Joseph Angel)	2017	—	—	—	—	—	—	—	—	—	—		non-album singles
"Thunder" (Imagine Dragons)	2017	4	---	---	2	18	20	2	3	10	20	FIMI: Gold; RMNZ: Gold; IFPI: Gold	EVOLVE
