= Kidinakorner =

American music company

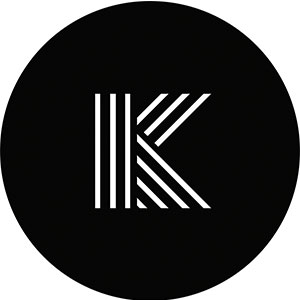
- Parent company: Interscope Geffen A&M
- Founded: 2011
- Founder: Alexander Grant
- Distributors: Interscope Capitol Labels Group (United States); Universal Music Group (International)
- Genre: Various
- Country of origin: United States
- Location: Los Angeles, California

Kidinakorner (stylized as KIDinaKORNER) is an American record company founded in 2011 by British music producer and songwriter Alexander "Alex da Kid" Grant. The company houses a record label, music publishing, commercial production and a marketing agency. The company is home to some prominent acts in the music industry, including Imagine Dragons and X Ambassadors.

== Record label ==
In 2010, Alexander "Alex da Kid" Grant founded Wonderland Entertainment, a publishing and production company. On August 10, 2010, it was revealed he had signed American singer-songwriter Skylar Grey, to a publishing deal. On June 1, 2011, Interscope Geffen A&M Records, a subsidiary of Universal Music Group, announced Grant signed a joint venture deal to launch his label imprint, KIDinaKORNER. The announcement came after Grant produced three of 2010's biggest singles, namely "Airplanes," "Love the Way You Lie," and "Coming Home," as well as 2011's "I Need a Doctor." On June 14, 2011, KIDinaKORNER released Skylar Grey's debut single, titled "Dance Without You," via digital distribution.

In November 2011, Grant signed American rock band Imagine Dragons and in 2012, released their debut album, Night Visions. Night Visions, included the Diamond-certified single "Radioactive", which spent a record-setting 87 weeks on the US Billboard Hot 100 chart. In January 2013, British singer-songwriter Jamie N Commons, signed a record deal with KIDinaKORNER/Interscope. In 2015, KIDinaKORNER released X Ambassadors debut, VHS, which was certified gold by the RIAA. In 2016, Alex da Kid released his debut single "Not Easy" featuring X Ambassadors, Elle King & Wiz Khalifa.

On the 19th of July, Skylar Grey announced that she had left Interscope/KidinaKorner.

== Marketing ==
After partnering with brands like Jeep, Target, and Budweiser, KIDinaKORNER entered into joint venture with WPP, one of the largest marketing and communications companies in the world, to build marketing campaigns centered around music.

== Artists ==
Act	Year signed	Releases under the label
Skylar Grey	2010	4
Imagine Dragons	2011	9
Jamie N Commons	2013	3
X Ambassadors	2013	5

== Releases ==
List of releases, with selected chart positions, sales figures and certifications
Artist	Album details	Peak chart positions									Sales	Certifications
Artist	Album details	US	AUS	CAN	GER	IRL	NZ	SWE	SWI	UK	Sales	Certifications
Skylar Grey	The Buried Sessions of Skylar Grey: Released: January 17, 2012; Label: Interscope, KidinaKorner; Format: Digital download	—	—	—	—	—	—	—	—	—		
Imagine Dragons	Continued Silence: Released: February 14, 2012 (US); Label: Interscope, KidinaKorner; Formats: CD, digital download	40	—	—	—	86	—	20	—	—		
Imagine Dragons	Night Visions: Released: September 4, 2012 (US); Label: Interscope, KidinaKorner; Formats: CD, LP, digital download	2	4	3	6	3	5	7	9	2	US: 2,243,000; CAN: 179,000; World: 4,000,000	RIAA: 2× Platinum; ARIA: Platinum; BPI: Platinum; BVMI: Platinum; IFPI SWE: 2× Platinum; IFPI SWI: Platinum; MC: 3× Platinum; RMNZ: Platinum
Imagine Dragons	Hear Me: Released: November 25, 2012 (UK); Label: Interscope, KidinaKorner; Formats: CD, digital download	—	—	—	—	—	—	—	—	—		
Imagine Dragons	The Archive EP: Released: February 12, 2013 (US); Label: Interscope, KidinaKorner; Formats: Digital download	134	—	—	—	—	—	—	—	—		
Jamie N Commons	Rumble and Sway: Released: March 5, 2013; Label: Interscope, KidinaKorner; Formats: CD, digital download	—	—	—	—	—	—	—	—	—		
X Ambassadors	Love Songs Drug Songs: Released: May 7, 2013; Label: Interscope, KidinaKorner; Formats: CD, digital download	—	—	—	—	—	—	—	—	—		
Imagine Dragons	iTunes Session: Released: May 28, 2013 (US); Label: Interscope, KidinaKorner; Formats: Digital download	56	—	—	—	—	—	—	—	—		
Skylar Grey	Don't Look Down: Released: July 9, 2013; Label: Interscope, KidinaKorner; Formats: CD, digital download	8	—	25	—	—	—	—	—	—		
Skylar Grey	iTunes Session: Released: October 15, 2013; Label: Interscope, KidinaKorner; Formats: CD, digital download	—	—	—	—	—	—	—	—	—		
X Ambassadors	The Reason: Released: April 22, 2014; Label: Interscope, KidinaKorner; Formats: Digital download	—	—	—	—	—	—	—	—	—		
Imagine Dragons	Smoke + Mirrors: Released: February 17, 2015; Label: Interscope, KidinaKorner; Formats: CD, LP, digital download	1	4	1	3	6	4	21	3	1	US: 500,000; CAN: 66,000; UK: 100,000	RIAA: Gold; BPI: Gold
X Ambassadors	VHS: Released: June 30, 2015; Label: Interscope, KidinaKorner; Formats: CD, digital download	7	—	2	56	—	—	—	—	41		
Jamie N Commons	Jamie N Commons: Released: May 20, 2016; Label: Interscope, KidinaKorner; Formats: CD, digital download	—	—	—	—	—	—	—	—	—		
Skylar Grey	Natural Causes: Released: September 23, 2016; Label: Interscope, KidinaKorner; Formats: CD, digital download	68	—	68	—	—	—	—	—	—		
Imagine Dragons	Evolve: Released: June 23, 2017; Label: Interscope, KidinaKorner; Formats: CD, LP, digital download	2	4	1	3	3	3	2	1	3	US: 240,000	RIAA: 2× Platinum; BPI: Gold; BVMI: Gold; MC: 2× Platinum; RMNZ: 2× Platinum; SNEP: 2× Platinum; IFPI: 2× Platinum; PMB: 2× Platinum; FIMI: 2× Platinum
Imagine Dragons	Origins: Released: November 9, 2018; Label: Interscope, KidinaKorner; Formats: CD, LP, cassette, digital download	2	4	1	6	11	3	2	2	9	US: 61,000	BPI: Silver; SNEP: Platinum; FIMI: Gold; ZPAV: Gold
X Ambassadors	Orion: Released: June 14, 2019; Label: Interscope, KidinaKorner; Formats: CD, digital download	125	—	—	—	—	—	—	—	—		
Jamie N Commons	Fever Dreams: Released: August 9, 2019; Label: Interscope, KidinaKorner; Formats: CD, digital download	—	—	—	—	—	—	—	—	—		
Imagine Dragons	Mercury – Act 1: Released: September 3, 2021; Label: Interscope, KidinaKorner; Formats: CD, LP, cassette, digital download	9	10	8	5	26	11	17	4	7	US: 17,000	SNEP: Gold
X Ambassadors	The Beautiful Liar: Released: September 24, 2021; Label: Interscope, KidinaKorner; Formats: CD, digital download	—	—	—	—	—	—	—	—	—		
