= Evolve World Tour =

2017–18 concert tour by Imagine Dragons

- World tour by Imagine Dragons
- The band performing in Sydney, Australia in May 2018
- Location: Asia; Europe; North America; Oceania; South America
- Associated album: Evolve
- Start date: September 26, 2017
- End date: November 22, 2019
- Legs: 14
- No. of shows: 136
- Supporting acts: Grouplove; K.Flay; Plutão Já Foi; Planeta; The Temper Trap; Grace VanderWaal; The Vaccines; Jake Bugg; Fil Bo Riva; Birthh

Imagine Dragons concert chronology
- Smoke + Mirrors Tour (2015–16); Evolve World Tour (2017–19); Mercury World Tour (2022–23)

The Evolve World Tour (stylized as ƎVOLVE World Tour) was the third concert tour by American pop rock band Imagine Dragons in support of their third studio album Evolve (2017). The tour began on September 26, 2017 in Phoenix, Arizona and concluded on November 18, 2018, in Mexico City.

== Background ==
Imagine Dragons conducted two previous tours, their Night Visions Tour and Smoke + Mirrors Tour, supporting their first two albums, released in 2012 and 2015. Following the release of two singles, "Believer" and "Thunder" in early 2017, the band released their third studio album, Evolve, in June 2017. In May, the band had announced the Evolve Tour in support of the album. On September 18, 2017 they announced 23 further dates, extending the tour to Europe. The Tour began on September 26, 2017. K. Flay was the opening act for their first US tour leg and their UK and Europe shows. In December, the band announced six shows in Australia and New Zealand. Singer-songwriter Grace VanderWaal was the opening act in the tour's 2018 summer leg in North America.

== Set list ==
North America Leg 1

This set list is from the concert on September 26, 2017, in Phoenix.

1. "I Don't Know Why"
2. "It's Time"
3. "Gold"
4. "Whatever It Takes"
5. "I'll Make It Up to You"
6. "Mouth of the River"
7. "Demons"
8. "Yesterday"
9. "Start Over"
10. "Rise Up"
11. "Dancing in the Dark"
12. "Second Chances"
13. "It Comes Back to You"
14. "Bleeding Out"
15. "Dream"
16. "Thunder"
17. "On Top of the World"
18. "I Bet My Life"
19. "Radioactive"

Encore

20. "Believer"
21. "Walking the Wire"
Asia

This set list is from the concert on January 7, 2018, in Singapore.

1. "I Don't Know Why"
2. "It's Time"
3. "Gold"
4. "Whatever It Takes"
5. "I'll Make It Up to You"
6. "Mouth of the River"
7. "Yesterday"
8. "Start Over"
9. "Demons"
10. "Rise Up"
11. "On Top of the World"
12. "Bleeding Out"
13. "Amsterdam"
14. "The Fall"
15. "Dream"
16. "Thunder"
17. "Believer"
18. "Walking the Wire"
19. "Radioactive"
Europe Leg 1

This set list is from the concert on February 24, 2018, in Birmingham.

1. "I Don't Know Why"
2. "It's Time"
3. "Gold"
4. "Whatever It Takes"
5. "I'll Make It Up to You"
6. "Mouth of the River"
7. "Yesterday"
8. "Start Over"
9. "Demons"
10. "Rise Up"
11. "On Top of the World"
12. "I Bet My Life"
13. "It Comes Back to You"
14. "Warriors" / "Bleeding Out"
15. "Thunder" (with K.Flay)
16. "Believer"

Encore

17. "Walking the Wire"
18. "The Fall"
19. "Radioactive"
South America

This set list is from the concert on March 22, 2018, in Rio de Janeiro.

1. "I Don't Know Why"
2. "Believer"
3. "It's Time"
4. "Gold"
5. "Whatever It Takes"
6. "I'll Make It Up to You"
7. "Mouth of the River"
8. "Yesterday"
9. "Start Over"
10. "Demons"
11. "Rise Up"
12. "On Top of the World"
13. "Thunder"
14. "Walking the Wire"
15. "The Fall"
16. "Radioactive"
North America Leg 2

This set list is from the concert on July 30, 2018, in Wichita.

1. "Radioactive"
2. "It's Time"
3. "Whatever It Takes"
4. "Yesterday"
5. "Natural"
6. "Walking the Wire"
7. "Next to Me"
8. "Shots"
9. "Every Breath You Take" (The Police cover)
10. "I'll Make It Up to You"
11. "Start Over"
12. "Rise Up"
13. "I Don't Know Why"
14. "Mouth of the River"
15. "Born to Be Yours"
16. "Amsterdam"
17. "I Bet My Life"

Encore

18. "Demons"
19. "Thunder"
20. "On Top of the World"
21. "Believer"

== Tour dates ==
List of 2017 concerts, showing date, city, country, or district, venue, opening act, tickets sold, number of available tickets and amount of gross revenue
Date	City	Country	Venue	Opening act(s)	Attendance	Revenue
September 26, 2017	Phoenix	United States	Talking Stick Resort Arena	Grouplove; K.Flay	12,551 / 12,977	$732,153
September 28, 2017	Chula Vista	United States	Mattress Firm Amphitheatre	Grouplove; K.Flay	11,845 / 19,582	$496,612
September 29, 2017	Las Vegas	United States	T-Mobile Arena	Grouplove; K.Flay	13,050 / 14,763	$775,536
October 1, 2017	Los Angeles	United States	Hollywood Bowl	Grouplove; K.Flay	16,478 / 17,407	$1,074,797
October 3, 2017	Mountain View	United States	Shoreline Amphitheatre	Grouplove; K.Flay	16,701 / 22,010	$508,469
October 4, 2017	Sacramento	United States	Golden 1 Center	Grouplove; K.Flay	10,868 / 11,542	$702,517
October 6, 2017	Seattle	United States	KeyArena	Grouplove; K.Flay	11,947 / 12,221	$687,749
October 8, 2017	Vancouver	Canada	Rogers Arena	Grouplove; K.Flay	12,846 / 12,846	$761,029
October 10, 2017	Edmonton	Canada	Rogers Place	Grouplove; K.Flay	12,847 / 12,847	$726,169
October 11, 2017	Calgary	Canada	Scotiabank Saddledome	Grouplove; K.Flay	11,461 / 11,461	$636,793
October 13, 2017	West Valley City	United States	USANA Amphitheatre	Grouplove; K.Flay	18,798 / 20,000	$525,754
October 14, 2017	Denver	United States	Pepsi Center	Grouplove; K.Flay	12,445 / 13,109	$919,507
October 16, 2017	Saint Paul	United States	Xcel Energy Center	Grouplove; K.Flay	14,688 / 15,086	$810,039
October 18, 2017	Chicago	United States	United Center	Grouplove; K.Flay	13,072 / 14,351	$932,852
October 19, 2017	Detroit	United States	Little Caesars Arena	Grouplove; K.Flay	12,697 / 14,704	$733,591
October 21, 2017	Cincinnati	United States	U.S. Bank Arena	Grouplove; K.Flay	12,211 / 12,658	$694,327
October 23, 2017	Brooklyn	United States	Barclays Center	Grouplove; K.Flay	12,600 / 13,100	$753,942
October 24, 2017	Newark	United States	Prudential Center	Grouplove; K.Flay	10,649 / 12,152	$612,412
October 26, 2017	Quebec City	Canada	Videotron Centre	Grouplove; K.Flay	11,681 / 12,766	$640,158
October 27, 2017	Montreal	Canada	Bell Centre	Grouplove; K.Flay	14,951 / 14,951	$892,760
October 29, 2017	Boston	United States	TD Garden	Grouplove; K.Flay	12,658 / 13,159	$855,279
November 1, 2017	Buffalo	United States	KeyBank Center	Grouplove; K.Flay	11,323 / 13,277	$628,074
November 2, 2017	Philadelphia	United States	Wells Fargo Center	Grouplove; K.Flay	13,815 / 15,414	$896,200
November 4, 2017	Uncasville	United States	Mohegan Sun Arena	Grouplove; K.Flay	5,634 / 7,769	$546,380
November 5, 2017	Washington, D.C.	United States	Capital One Arena	Grouplove; K.Flay	13,465 / 14,042	$950,685
November 7, 2017	Atlanta	United States	Philips Arena	Grouplove; K.Flay	11,112 / 11,482	$618,006
November 8, 2017	Charlotte	United States	Spectrum Center	Grouplove; K.Flay	14,064 / 16,007	$717,245
November 10, 2017	Orlando	United States	Amway Center	Grouplove; K.Flay	13,073 / 13,453	$836,703
November 12, 2017	Houston	United States	Toyota Center	Grouplove; K.Flay	11,354 / 11,815	$786,289
November 13, 2017	Dallas	United States	American Airlines Center	Grouplove; K.Flay	13,390 / 14,276	$845,281
November 16, 2017	Anaheim	United States	Honda Center	Grouplove; K.Flay	12,078 / 12,693	$802,870

List of 2018 concerts, showing date, city, country, or district, venue, opening act, tickets sold, number of available tickets and amount of gross revenue
Date	City	Country	Venue	Opening act(s)	Attendance	Revenue
January 6, 2018	Shah Alam	Malaysia	Malawati Stadium	—N/a	—N/a	—N/a
January 7, 2018	Singapore		Singapore Indoor Stadium	—N/a	—N/a	—N/a
January 9, 2018	Tokyo	Japan	Tokyo Metropolitan Gymnasium	—N/a	—N/a	—N/a
January 11, 2018	Bangkok	Thailand	IMPACT Challenger	—N/a	—N/a	—N/a
January 13, 2018	Hong Kong	Hong Kong	AsiaWorld–Arena	—N/a	—N/a	—N/a
January 15, 2018	Taipei	Taiwan	Nangang C3 Field	—N/a	—N/a	—N/a
January 17, 2018	Shanghai	China	Mercedes-Benz Arena	—N/a	12,184 / 12,184	$1,285,921
February 16, 2018	Antwerp	Belgium	Sportpaleis	K.Flay	20,272 / 21,372	$954,137
February 17, 2018	Esch-sur-Alzette	Luxembourg	Rockhal	K.Flay	5,849 / 5,849	$319,912
February 19, 2018	Amsterdam	Netherlands	Ziggo Dome	K.Flay	15,781 / 15,781	$834,999
February 22, 2018	Paris	France	AccorHotels Arena	K.Flay	14,884 / 15,694	$904,612
February 24, 2018	Birmingham	England	Genting Arena	K.Flay	13,616 / 14,481	$766,820
February 26, 2018	Dublin	Ireland	3Arena	K.Flay	12,475 / 12,475	$682,300
February 28, 2018	London	England	The O_{2} Arena	K.Flay	34,495 / 36,938	$2,042,709
March 1, 2018	London	England	The O_{2} Arena	K.Flay	34,495 / 36,938	$2,042,709
March 3, 2018	Manchester	England	Manchester Arena	K.Flay	14,620 / 15,290	$770,043
March 4, 2018	Glasgow	Scotland	SSE Hydro	K.Flay	12,382 / 12,447	$630,650
March 16, 2018 (Note: This concert was part of the Lollapalooza.)	Buenos Aires	Argentina	Hipódromo de San Isidro	—N/a	—N/a	—N/a
March 17, 2018	Santiago	Chile	O'Higgins Park	—N/a	—N/a	—N/a
March 20, 2018 (Note: This concert was part of Asunciónico.)	Asuncion	Paraguay	Espacio Idesa	—N/a	—N/a	—N/a
March 22, 2018	Rio de Janeiro	Brazil	KM de Vantagens Hall	Plutão Já Foi Planeta	5,299 / 8,434	$343,243
March 24, 2018	São Paulo	Brazil	Autódromo José Carlos Pace	—N/a	—N/a	—N/a
April 3, 2018	Paris	France	AccorHotels Arena	K.Flay	15,868 / 16,063	$944,610
April 4, 2018	Bordeaux	France	Metropole Arena	K.Flay	10,952 / 10,952	$625,269
April 6, 2018	Barcelona	Spain	Palau Sant Jordi	K.Flay	16,990 / 16,990	$1,046,643
April 7, 2018	Madrid	Spain	WiZink Center	K.Flay	16,162 / 16,597	$1,209,697
April 9, 2018	Montpellier	France	Sud de France Arena	K.Flay	12,545 / 12,545	$736,025
April 10, 2018	Lyon	France	Halle Tony Garnier	K.Flay	14,385 / 14,385	$841,968
April 12, 2018	Munich	Germany	Olympiahalle	K.Flay	12,111 / 12,111	$789,692
April 13, 2018	Zürich	Switzerland	Hallenstadion	K.Flay	14,396 / 15,000	$750,424
April 15, 2018	Vienna	Austria	Wiener Stadthalle	K.Flay	14,228 / 14,228	$803,090
April 16, 2018	Prague	Czech Republic	O_{2} Arena Prague	K.Flay	16,710 / 16,710	$1,049,689
April 18, 2018	Oberhausen	Germany	König Pilsener Arena	K.Flay	11,141 / 11,308	$736,350
April 19, 2018	Frankfurt	Germany	Festhalle Frankfurt	K.Flay	11,490 / 11,490	$759,072
April 22, 2018	Hamburg	Germany	Barclaycard Arena	K.Flay	11,527 / 11,527	$760,966
April 25, 2018	Oslo	Norway	Oslo Spektrum	K.Flay	9,144 / 9,144	$543,125
April 26, 2018	Stockholm	Sweden	Ericsson Globe	K.Flay	13,895 / 13,895	$849,422
May 12, 2018	Perth	Australia	Perth Arena	The Temper Trap	11,091 / 11,666	$858,115
May 15, 2018	Melbourne	Australia	Margaret Court Arena	The Temper Trap	13,471 / 15,000	$1,005,927
May 16, 2018	Melbourne	Australia	Margaret Court Arena	The Temper Trap	13,471 / 15,000	$1,005,927
May 18, 2018	Brisbane	Australia	Brisbane Entertainment Centre	The Temper Trap	9,299 / 9,447	$696,231
May 19, 2018	Sydney	Australia	Qudos Bank Arena	The Temper Trap	13,453 / 13,828	$963,942
May 21, 2018	Auckland	New Zealand	Spark Arena	The Temper Trap	9,865 / 10,500	$634,453
May 23, 2018	Wellington	New Zealand	TSB Bank Arena	The Temper Trap	5,635 / 5,635	$387,029
June 5, 2018	Hartford	United States	Xfinity Theatre	Grace VanderWaal	34,326 / 44,132	$1,597,485
June 6, 2018	Mansfield	United States	Xfinity Center	Grace VanderWaal	—N/a	—N/a
June 8, 2018	Bangor	United States	Darling's Waterfront Pavilion	Grace VanderWaal	14,350 / 14,350	$843,363
June 9, 2018	Holmdel	United States	PNC Bank Arts Center	Grace VanderWaal	16,349 / 16,349	$968,630
June 11, 2018	Syracuse	United States	Lakeview Amphitheater	Grace VanderWaal	16,833 / 17,118	$745,765
June 13, 2018	Toronto	Canada	Budweiser Stage	Grace VanderWaal	30,633 / 32,914	$2,711,244
June 14, 2018	Toronto	Canada	Budweiser Stage	Grace VanderWaal	30,633 / 32,914	$2,711,244
June 16, 2018	Hershey	United States	Hersheypark Stadium	Grace VanderWaal	30,440 / 30,632	$1,520,568
June 17, 2018	Cuyahoga Falls	United States	Blossom Music Center	Grace VanderWaal	20,733 / 20,867	$939,001
June 19, 2018	New York City	United States	Madison Square Garden	Grace VanderWaal	13,977 / 13,977	$1,378,894
June 21, 2018	Clarkston	United States	DTE Energy Music Theatre	Grace VanderWaal	14,793 / 14,793	$1,014,943
June 22, 2018	Noblesville	United States	Ruoff Home Mortgage Music Center	Grace VanderWaal	24,142 / 24,142	$1,105,961
June 24, 2018	Omaha	United States	CenturyLink Center Omaha	Grace VanderWaal	13,806 / 13,806	$962,062
June 26, 2018	Sioux Falls	United States	Denny Sanford Premier Center	Grace VanderWaal	10,683 / 10,683	$824,402
June 27, 2018 (Note: This concert was part of the 2018 Summerfest Grounds.)	Milwaukee	United States	American Family Insurance Amphitheater	Grace VanderWaal	22,106 / 22,106	$1,170,509
June 29, 2018	Saratoga Springs	United States	Saratoga Performing Arts Center	Grace VanderWaal	22,106 / 22,106	$1,013,362
June 30, 2018 (Note: This concert was part of the Radio 104.5's 11th Birthday Show.)	Camden	United States	BB&T Pavilion	Grace VanderWaal	—N/a	—N/a
July 2, 2018	Bristow	United States	Jiffy Lube Live	Grace VanderWaal	22,427 / 22,700	$910,791
July 3, 2018	Virginia Beach	United States	Veterans United Home Loans Amphitheater	Grace VanderWaal	19,455 / 19,456	$687,539
July 5, 2018	Raleigh	United States	Coastal Credit Union Music Park	Grace VanderWaal	19,434 / 19,434	$729,148
July 7, 2018	Columbia	United States	Colonial Life Arena	Grace VanderWaal	12,805 / 12,805	$897,574
July 8, 2018	Brandon	United States	Brandon Amphitheater	Grace VanderWaal	7,144 / 7,144	$548,283
July 10, 2018	Nashville	United States	Bridgestone Arena	Grace VanderWaal	13,176 / 17,272	$846,301
July 11, 2018	Maryland Heights	United States	Hollywood Casino Amphitheatre	Grace VanderWaal	18,488 / 18,488	$721,680
July 13, 2018	Tinley Park	United States	Hollywood Casino Amphitheatre	Grace VanderWaal	27,499 / 27,499	$1,445,974
July 14, 2018	Kansas City	United States	Sprint Center	Grace VanderWaal	14,117 / 14,117	$932,195
July 16, 2018	Morrison	United States	Red Rocks Amphitheatre	Grace VanderWaal	9,074 / 9,525	$841,973
July 18, 2018	Albuquerque	United States	Isleta Amphitheater	Grace VanderWaal	14,791 / 15,166	$689,922
July 21, 2018	Inglewood	United States	The Forum	Grace VanderWaal	28,860 / 28,860	$2,325,357
July 22, 2018	Inglewood	United States	The Forum	Grace VanderWaal	28,860 / 28,860	$2,325,357
July 24, 2018	Concord	United States	Concord Pavilion	Grace VanderWaal	11,868 / 11,868	$682,709
July 26, 2018	Bozeman	United States	Bobcat Stadium	Grace VanderWaal	19,788 / 19,993	$1,395,539
July 28, 2018 (Note: This concert was part of LOVELOUD 2018.)	Salt Lake City	United States	Rice–Eccles Stadium	Grace VanderWaal	—N/a	—N/a
July 30, 2018	Wichita	United States	Intrust Bank Arena	Grace VanderWaal	11,189 / 11,189	$696,480
August 1, 2018	Tulsa	United States	BOK Center	Grace VanderWaal	12,271 / 12,649	$849,870
August 2, 2018	Austin	United States	Austin360 Amphitheater	Grace VanderWaal	12,077 / 12,085	$743,684
August 4, 2018 (Note: This concert was unexpectedly shortened due to lead singer Dan Reynolds not being able to sing after one of his vocal chords stopped moving.)	The Woodlands	United States	Cynthia Woods Mitchell Pavilion	Grace VanderWaal	15,839 / 15,839	$818,732
August 5, 2018	New Orleans	United States	Smoothie King Center	Grace VanderWaal	12,234 / 12,569	$871,386
August 7, 2018	Orange Beach	United States	The Amphitheater at The Wharf	Grace VanderWaal	9,514 / 9,514	$626,812
August 9, 2018	West Palm Beach	United States	Coral Sky Amphitheatre	Grace VanderWaal	18,979 / 19,138	$785,401
August 10, 2018	Tampa	United States	MidFlorida Credit Union Amphitheatre	Grace VanderWaal	18,395 / 18,397	$807,135
August 16, 2018	St. Pölten	Austria	FM4 Frequency Festival	—N/a	—N/a	—N/a
August 18, 2018	Hasselt	Belgium	Pukkelpop Festival	—N/a	—N/a	—N/a
August 21, 2018	Maxéville	France	Zénith de Nancy	The Vaccines	—N/a	—N/a
August 22, 2018 (Note: This concert is part of the 2018 Zürich Openair.)	Zürich	Switzerland	Zürich Openair	—N/a	—N/a	—N/a
August 25, 2018	Arnhem	Netherlands	Gelredome	The Vaccines	31,805 / 31,805	$1,714,655
August 29, 2018	Moscow	Russia	Luzhniki Stadium	The Vaccines	—N/a	—N/a
August 31, 2018	Kyiv	Ukraine	NSC Olimpiyskiy Stadium	The Vaccines	—N/a	—N/a
September 2, 2018	Istanbul	Turkey	Küçükçiftlik Park	The Vaccines	—N/a	—N/a
September 4, 2018	Lisbon	Portugal	Altice Arena	The Vaccines	18,844 / 19,064	$1,071,607
September 6, 2018 (Note: This concert is part of the Milano Rocks 2018.)	Milan	Italy	Area Expo	The Vaccines, Maneskin		
September 8, 2018	Madrid	Spain	DCODE Fest	—N/a	—N/a	—N/a
September 9, 2018 (Note: This concert is part of the Lollapalooza Berlin.)	Berlin	Germany	Olympiastadion	—N/a	—N/a	—N/a
October 20, 2018	Frisco	United States	Toyota Stadium	—N/a	—N/a	—N/a
November 7, 2018	Las Vegas	United States	The Chelsea Ballroom	—N/a	—N/a	—N/a
November 17, 2018	Monterrey	Mexico	Auditorio Citibanamex	—N/a	7,534 / 7,534	$545,812
November 18, 2018 (Note: This concert is part of the Corona Capital.)	Mexico City	Mexico	Autódromo Hermanos Rodríguez	—N/a	—N/a	—N/a
December 31, 2018	Las Vegas	United States	Cosmopolitan of Las Vegas	—N/a	—N/a	—N/a

List of 2019 concerts, showing date, city, country, or district, venue, opening act, tickets sold, number of available tickets and amount of gross revenue
Date	City	Country	Venue	Opening act(s)	Attendance	Revenue
May 24, 2019 (Note: This concert is part of BottleRock Napa Valley.)	Napa Valley	United States	Napa Valley Expo	—N/a	—N/a	—N/a
May 25, 2019 (Note: This concert is part of Northwell Health's Side By Side: A Celebration of Service.)	New York City	United States	Radio City Music Hall	—N/a	5,902 / 5,902	$453,203
June 2, 2019	Florence	Italy	Visarno Arena	Jake Bugg; Fil Bo Riva; Birthh	—N/a	—N/a
August 4, 2019	Canton	United States	Tom Benson Hall of Fame Stadium	—N/a	—N/a	—N/a
October 6, 2019 (Note: This concert is part of Rock In Rio.)	Rio de Janeiro	Brazil	Barra Olympic Park	—N/a	—N/a	—N/a
November 1, 2019 (Note: This concert is part of the 2019 Formula One United States Grand Prix Concert Series.)	Austin	United States	Circuit of the Americas	—N/a	—N/a	—N/a
November 22, 2019 (Note: This concert is part of the Diriyah ePrix.)	Riyadh	Saudi Arabia	Riyadh Street Circuit	—N/a	—N/a	—N/a
Total					1,521,353 / 1,591,873 (95.57%)	$90,063,214

=== Cancelled shows ===
List of cancelled concerts, showing date, city, country, venue, and reason for cancellation
Date	City	Country	Venue	Reason
October 21, 2018 (Note: This concert was supposed to be a part of Lost Lake Festival.)	Phoenix	United States	Steele Indian School Park	Festival cancellation
July 13, 2019 (Note: This concert was supposed to be a part of Festival d'été de Québec.)	Quebec City	Canada	Festival d'été de Québec	Weather conditions
August 18, 2019 (Note: This concert was supposed to be a part of Woodstock 50.)	Columbia	United States	Merriweather Post Pavilion (Note: This concert was supposed to be take place at Watkins Glen International.)	Festival cancellation
