= Evolve (Imagine Dragons album) =

2017 studio album by Imagine Dragons

Studio album by Imagine Dragons
- Released: June 23, 2017
- Recorded: September 2016 – May 2017
- Studios: Wolf Cousins Studios, Stockholm, Sweden; Ragged Insomnia Studio, Las Vegas, Nevada, US; Golden Age, Los Angeles, California, US; Rodeo Recording, Santa Monica, California, US; Sargent Recorders, Los Angeles; Capital Studios, Los Angeles; Abbey Road, London, UK
- Genres: Arena rock; EDM; electronic; pop; pop rock
- Length: 39:12
- Labels: Kidinakorner; Interscope
- Producers: Alex da Kid; Mattman & Robin; Joel Little; John Hill; Tim Randolph; Jayson DeZuzio; Imagine Dragons

Imagine Dragons chronology
Smoke + Mirrors (2015)	Evolve (2017)	Origins (2018)

Singles from Evolve
- 1. "Believer" Released: February 1, 2017; 2. "Thunder" Released: April 27, 2017; 3. "Whatever It Takes" Released: October 6, 2017; 4. "Next to Me" Released: February 21, 2018

Evolve (stylized as ƎVOLVE) is the third studio album by American pop rock band Imagine Dragons, released on June 23, 2017, by Kidinakorner and Interscope Records. After the release of their previous album Smoke + Mirrors (2015) and its respective world tour, a self-imposed hiatus for 2016 and cryptic messages from the band through their social media gained anticipation for their third album; it was finally announced on May 9, 2017, along with the initiation of its pre-order. In comparison to Smoke + Mirrors and their 2012 debut Night Visions, frontman Dan Reynolds called the album an "evolution" for the band.

Evolve peaked at number 2 on the US Billboard 200, and received mixed reviews from critics; some acknowledged the band's claim of evolution, while others described it as lifeless and commercially oriented. It was promoted with the four singles "Believer", "Thunder", "Whatever It Takes", and "Next to Me", as well as a promotional single, "Walking the Wire", and a world tour produced by Live Nation and supported with Grouplove and K.Flay that started in September 2017. The album was also nominated for the Grammy Award for Best Pop Vocal Album at the 60th Annual Grammy Awards.

== Background ==
In February 2016, after the success of their second album Smoke + Mirrors and a ten month long world tour, the members of Imagine Dragons vowed to take time off from the band. In an interview with Billboard, lead singer Dan Reynolds stated that the group would be on hiatus for the remainder of the year, explaining "We [Imagine Dragons] haven't stopped in, like, six years, so we've forced ourselves to at least take a year off." Throughout 2016, the band contributed songs to the soundtracks for Me Before You, Suicide Squad and Passengers, as well as playing at several shows.

The band first began preparing their third album on September 13, 2016, with a picture of guitarist Wayne Sermon in the band's recording studio and continued releasing cryptic messages over the next four months. On January 24, 2017, the band tweeted "goodnight +", effectively ending the Smoke + Mirrors album cycle.

== Composition ==
Reynolds had noted that the album, compared to Night Visions and Smoke + Mirrors, is "an evolution for Imagine Dragons". The album's sound has been described as arena rock, EDM electronic, pop, and pop rock, while containing elements of hip-hop and R&B.

== Promotion ==
In the months leading up to the album's release, Imagine Dragons used the caption "ƎE" in multiple social media posts. The group announced the title of their third album on May 8, and started the album pre-order along with the release of "Whatever It Takes" at 9 pm PT.

=== Singles ===
Starting on January 28, 2017, the band tweeted a series of four videos to tease the album's first single. The time-lapse videos featured lead singer Dan Reynolds drawing surreal images on a drawing pad. Morse code was hidden in the videos and translated to "objects of same color". On February 1, 2017, "Believer" was released as the lead single. To promote the single, it was used in a Super Bowl LI commercial for the Nintendo Switch. It was also used in the trailer for the 2017 film Murder on the Orient Express. The song peaked at number four on the Billboard Hot 100. Its music video starring Reynolds and actor Dolph Lundgren was released on March 7, 2017.

On April 27, 2017, "Thunder" was released as the second single. It peaked at number four on the Hot 100. The music video was filmed in Dubai and directed by Joseph Kahn, and was released on May 2, 2017.

On October 6, 2017, "Whatever It Takes" was released as the third single alongside the announcement of the album title. It peaked at number 12 on the Billboard Hot 100. It was initially released as the album's first promotional single.

On February 21, 2018, "Next to Me" was released as the fourth single with a digital re-release of the album, alongside the announcement of extended summer tour dates.

=== Promotional singles ===
On June 15, 2017, "Walking the Wire" was made available for download with any purchase from the band's online shop.

=== Tour and film ===
On May 9, 2017, the band announced on Twitter the Evolve World Tour, which started on September 26, 2017, in Phoenix, Arizona. The tour was produced by Live Nation, with Grouplove and K.Flay as special guests.

On March 8, 2018, Billboard reported that the band had become the first act in history to "monopolize the top four spots on Billboard's Alternative Digital Song Sales chart, ranking at Nos. 1-4 on the March 10-dated tally." On March 13, Billboard reported that the album had become the "first album to generate at least three No. 1s on Billboard's Alternative Songs airplay chart this decade." Also that day, the band released a cinematic film for their song, "Next to Me".

== Critical reception ==
Professional ratings
Aggregate scores
Source	Rating
AnyDecentMusic?	4.6/10
Metacritic	47/100
Review scores
Source	Rating
AllMusic	4/5 stars
The Guardian	2/5 stars
The Independent	2/5 stars
The Irish Times	3/5 stars
London Evening Standard	3/5 stars
Newsday	B+
NME	3/5 stars
Rolling Stone	2/5 stars
State	2/5 stars
The Times	2/5 stars

Evolve received mixed reviews from music critics. At Metacritic, which assigns a normalized rating out of 100 to reviews from mainstream critics, the album received an average score of 47, based on 7 reviews, which indicates "mixed or average reviews". Glenn Gamboa from Newsday gave the album a score of B+, stating that the group, "seem ready to transcend genre labels—they just want to make good music that interests them." In a three-out-of-five-star review from NME, Alex Flood wrote, "This latest effort might represent a small progression, but it's far from an evolution." AllMusic also gave a three-out-of-five review on the album, with Stephen Thomas Erlewine saying, "its bold, colorful textures elbow aside any notions of introspection or reflection." Rob Harvilla from The Ringer gave the album a mixed review, concluding: "All of which is to say that Evolve isn't great by any means, but it's awfully shrewd, and you might end up rooting for it if only because there's nobody else to root for. It's probably the band's best album: It is definitely their slickest, their deftest, their shortest."

The album also garnered some negative reviews. In a more negative review, Classic Rock Magazine gave the album one and a half stars out of five, commenting that the band aims for more rock noise, although, "it [Evolve] just comes off like Michael Bolton dad dancing to Justin Timberlake at a family wedding." Hannah J. Davies of The Guardian gave the album two stars out of five, calling the album, "lifeless electronic-tinged arena rock." The Independent gave Evolve two-out-of-five stars, describing it as, "mostly devolving back into the hoariest of tired rock cliches (including what sounds like roto-toms), and plodding grimly towards the summer’s festivals."

== Commercial performance ==
Evolve debuted at number two on the US Billboard 200 with 147,000 album-equivalent units, of which 109,000 were pure album sales. It is Imagine Dragons' third top five album. As of December 2, 2024, the album has been certified 4× Platinum by the RIAA.

== Track listing ==
All tracks are written by Dan Reynolds, Wayne Sermon, Ben McKee, and Daniel Platzman. Additional writers are included below.

No.	Title	Writer(s)	Producer(s)	Length
1.	"I Don't Know Why"	Robin Fredriksson; Mattias Larsson; Justin Tranter	Mattman & Robin	3:10
2.	"Whatever It Takes"	Joel Little	Little	3:21
3.	"Believer"	Fredriksson; Larsson; Tranter	Mattman & Robin	3:24
4.	"Walking the Wire"	Fredriksson; Larsson; Tranter	Mattman & Robin	3:53
5.	"Rise Up"	John Hill	Hill	3:52
6.	"I'll Make It Up to You"	Tim Randolph	Randolph	4:23
7.	"Yesterday"	Alexander Grant; Jayson DeZuzio	Alex da Kid; DeZuzio	3:25
8.	"Mouth of the River"	Randolph	Randolph	3:42
9.	"Thunder"	Grant; DeZuzio	Alex da Kid; DeZuzio	3:07
10.	"Start Over"	Fredriksson; Larsson; Tranter	Mattman & Robin	3:06
11.	"Dancing in the Dark"	Grant	Alex da Kid	3:54
Total length:				39:12

Deluxe edition bonus tracks
No.	Title	Writer(s)	Producer(s)	Length
12.	"Levitate"	Randolph	Randolph	3:18
13.	"Not Today"	Michael Daly	Imagine Dragons	4:21
14.	"Believer" (Kaskade remix)	Fredriksson; Larsson; Tranter	Kaskade	3:14
Total length:				50:02

Japanese edition
No.	Title	Writer(s)	Producer(s)	Length
15.	"Roots"	Grant	Alex da Kid	2:54
Total length:				52:57

Digital re-release
No.	Title	Writer(s)	Producer(s)	Length
1.	"Next to Me"	Grant	Alex da Kid	3:50
Total length:				46:57

== Personnel ==
Credits for "Evolve" are adapted from the official liner notes, Tidal and AllMusic, with "Next To Me" being referred to as track 1.

Imagine Dragons

- Dan Reynolds – lead vocals, keyboards, backing vocals, acoustic guitar
- Wayne Sermon – electric guitar, backing vocals, acoustic guitar
- Ben McKee – bass guitar, keyboards, backing vocals
- Daniel Platzman – drums, percussion, backing vocals

Production

- Alex da Kid – executive production; production, programming, songwriting (tracks 1, 8, 10, 12 & "Roots")
- Mattman & Robin – production, songwriting (tracks 2, 4, 5, 11)
- Joel Little – production (track 3)
- John Hill – production (track 6)
- Tim Randolph – production (tracks 7, 9 & "Levitate")
- Jayson DeZuzio – production (tracks 8, 10)
- Manny Marroquin – mixing (tracks 1, 8, 10, 12)
- Serban Ghenea – mixing (tracks 2–7, 9, 11 & "Levitate")
- Robert Orton – mixing ("Levitate")
- John Hanes – mix engineering (tracks 2–7, 9, 11, "Levitate")
- Rob Cohen – engineering, vocal production (track 6)
- Dave Cerminara – engineering (tracks 7 & 9)
- Travis Ference – engineering (tracks 8, 10 & 12)
- Randy Merrill – mastering (tracks 2, 3, 5–12
- Tom Coyne – mastering (track 4 & "Levitate")
- Kaskade – remixing ("Believer (Kaskade Remix)")
- Beeple – art and design
- Dina Hovsepian – layout design
- Eliot Lee Hazel – photography
- Mac Reynolds – management
- Robert Reynolds – legal
- Jeff Schwartz – business manager
- Carrie Martin – booking
- James Whitting – U.K./Europe booking
- Hillary Siskind – press
- Lisa Gottgeil – press
- Matt LaMatte – marketing

== Charts ==
=== Weekly charts ===
Weekly chart performance for Evolve
Chart (2017–2025)	Peak position
Australian Albums (ARIA)	4
Austrian Albums (Ö3 Austria)	2
Belgian Albums (Ultratop Flanders)	5
Belgian Albums (Ultratop Wallonia)	2
Canadian Albums (Billboard)	1
Czech Albums (ČNS IFPI)	1
Danish Albums (Hitlisten)	6
Dutch Albums (Album Top 100)	2
Finnish Albums (Suomen virallinen lista)	1
French Albums (SNEP)	3
German Albums (Offizielle Top 100)	3
Greek Albums (IFPI)	7
Hungarian Albums (MAHASZ)	6
Irish Albums (IRMA)	3
Italian Albums (FIMI)	3
Latvian Albums (LaIPA)	6
Mexican Albums (Top 100 Mexico)	4
New Zealand Albums (RMNZ)	3
Norwegian Albums (VG-lista)	1
Polish Albums (ZPAV)	1
Portuguese Albums (AFP)	7
Scottish Albums (Official Charts)	3
Slovak Albums (IFPI)	1
Spanish Albums (Promusicae)	3
Swedish Albums (Sverigetopplistan)	2
Swiss Albums (Schweizer Hitparade)	1
UK Albums (Official Charts)	3
US Billboard 200	2
US Top Alternative Albums (Billboard)	1
US Top Rock Albums (Billboard)	1

=== Year-end charts ===
2017 year-end chart performance for Evolve
Chart (2017)	Position
Australian Albums (ARIA)	28
Austrian Albums (Ö3 Austria)	25
Belgian Albums (Ultratop Flanders)	35
Belgian Albums (Ultratop Wallonia)	49
Canadian Albums (Billboard)	12
Czech Albums (ČNS IFPI)	6
Danish Albums (Hitlisten)	52
Dutch Albums (Album Top 100)	26
French Albums (SNEP)	42
German Albums (Offizielle Top 100)	33
Hungarian Albums (MAHASZ)	100
Icelandic Albums (Plötutíóindi)	36
Italian Albums (FIMI)	21
Mexican Albums (Top 100 Mexico)	43
New Zealand Albums (RMNZ)	26
Polish Albums (ZPAV)	36
South Korean International Albums (Gaon)	60
Spanish Albums (PROMUSICAE)	62
Swedish Albums (Sverigetopplistan)	6
Swiss Albums (Schweizer Hitparade)	20
UK Albums (OCC)	72
US Billboard 200	24
US Top Rock Albums (Billboard)	2

2018 year-end chart performance for Evolve
Chart (2018)	Position
Australian Albums (ARIA)	21
Belgian Albums (Ultratop Flanders)	78
Belgian Albums (Ultratop Wallonia)	151
Canadian Albums (Billboard)	7
Czech Albums (ČNS IFPI)	3
Danish Albums (Hitlisten)	42
Dutch Albums (Album Top 100)	87
French Albums (SNEP)	40
German Albums (Offizielle Top 100)	46
Italian Albums (FIMI)	32
Mexican Albums (Top 100 Mexico)	41
New Zealand Albums (RMNZ)	19
Polish Albums (ZPAV)	23
Portuguese Albums (AFP)	50
South Korean International Albums (Gaon)	48
Spanish Albums (PROMUSICAE)	56
Swedish Albums (Sverigetopplistan)	9
Swiss Albums (Schweizer Hitparade)	15
UK Albums (OCC)	70
US Billboard 200	11
US Top Rock Albums (Billboard)	1

2019 year-end chart performance for Evolve
Chart (2019)	Position
Australian Albums (ARIA)	72
Belgian Albums (Ultratop Flanders)	44
Belgian Albums (Ultratop Wallonia)	94
Canadian Albums (Billboard)	40
Danish Albums (Hitlisten)	81
Icelandic Albums (Plötutíóindi)	98
Italian Albums (FIMI)	75
Swedish Albums (Sverigetopplistan)	36
US Billboard 200	50
US Top Rock Albums (Billboard)	6

2020 year-end chart performance for Evolve
Chart (2020)	Position
Belgian Albums (Ultratop Flanders)	105
Belgian Albums (Ultratop Wallonia)	134
Dutch Albums (Album Top 100)	60
Swedish Albums (Sverigetopplistan)	60
US Billboard 200	106
US Top Rock Albums (Billboard)	10

2021 year-end chart performance for Evolve
Chart (2021)	Position
Belgian Albums (Ultratop Flanders)	119
Belgian Albums (Ultratop Wallonia)	114
Dutch Albums (Album Top 100)	58
Swedish Albums (Sverigetopplistan)	80
US Billboard 200	114
US Top Rock Albums (Billboard)	15

2022 year-end chart performance for Evolve
Chart (2022)	Position
Belgian Albums (Ultratop Flanders)	104
Belgian Albums (Ultratop Wallonia)	103
Dutch Albums (Album Top 100)	54
Lithuanian Albums (AGATA)	57
Swedish Albums (Sverigetopplistan)	99
US Billboard 200	146
US Top Rock Albums (Billboard)	27

2023 year-end chart performance for Evolve
Chart (2023)	Position
Belgian Albums (Ultratop Flanders)	144
Belgian Albums (Ultratop Wallonia)	144
Dutch Albums (Album Top 100)	84
Hungarian Albums (MAHASZ)	88
US Billboard 200	177

2024 year-end chart performance for Evolve
Chart (2024)	Position
Belgian Albums (Ultratop Flanders)	125
Belgian Albums (Ultratop Wallonia)	124
Dutch Albums (Album Top 100)	85
Hungarian Albums (MAHASZ)	78
Swiss Albums (Schweizer Hitparade)	83

2025 year-end chart performance for Evolve
Chart (2025)	Position
Belgian Albums (Ultratop Flanders)	123
Belgian Albums (Ultratop Wallonia)	106
Dutch Albums (Album Top 100)	95
Hungarian Albums (MAHASZ)	69

=== Decade-end charts ===
Decade-end chart performance for Evolve
Chart (2010–2019)	Position
US Billboard 200	34
US Top Rock Albums (Billboard)	5

=== 21st century charts ===
21st century chart performance for Evolve
Chart (2000–2025)	Position
US Billboard 200	122

== Certifications ==
Certifications and sales for Evolve
Region	Certification	Certified units/sales
Austria (IFPI Austria)	Platinum	15,000^{‡}
Belgium (BRMA)	3× Platinum	90,000^{‡}
Brazil (Pro-Música Brasil)	2× Platinum	80,000^{‡}
Canada (Music Canada)	2× Platinum	160,000^{‡}
Denmark (IFPI Danmark)	3× Platinum	60,000^{‡}
France (SNEP)	Diamond	500,000^{‡}
Germany (BVMI)	Platinum	200,000^{‡}
India (IMI)	31× Platinum	930,000
Italy (FIMI)	4× Platinum	200,000^{‡}
Mexico (AMPROFON)	2× Platinum	120,000^{‡}
Netherlands (NVPI)	Platinum	40,000^{‡}
New Zealand (RMNZ)	6× Platinum	90,000^{‡}
Norway (IFPI Norway)	2× Platinum	40,000^{‡}
Poland (ZPAV)	Diamond	100,000^{‡}
Portugal (AFP)	Platinum	7,000^{‡}
Singapore (RIAS)	Platinum	10,000^{*}
Spain (Promusicae)	Gold	20,000^{‡}
Sweden (GLF)	Platinum	30,000^{‡}
United Kingdom (BPI)	Platinum	300,000^{‡}
United States (RIAA)	4× Platinum	4,000,000^{‡}
^{*} Sales figures based on certification alone.^{‡} Sales+streaming figures based on certification alone.

== See also ==
- List of number-one albums of 2017 (Canada)
- List of number-one albums of 2017 (Finland)
- List of number-one albums of 2017 (Norway)
- List of number-one hits of 2017 (Switzerland)
