= Jon Spaihts =

American screenwriter and author (born 1970)

- Born: February 4, 1970 (age 56); New York City, U.S.
- Occupations: Screenwriter; author
- Years active: 1996–present
- Spouse: Johanna Watts

Jon Spaihts (/speɪts/) (born February 4, 1970) is an American screenwriter and author. He is best known for co-writing Denis Villeneuve's Dune (2021) and its sequels Part Two (2024) and the upcoming Part Three (2026), all films based on the novel series of the same name by Frank Herbert. He also wrote the screenplays for the films Prometheus (2012), Passengers (2016) and Doctor Strange (2016). For his work on Dune, Spaihts was nominated for the Academy Award for Best Adapted Screenplay.

== Early life and education ==
Spaihts was born in New York City, the son of Jean, a computer programmer, and Jim Spaihts, an electronics engineer. Spaihts is an alumnus of Princeton University.

== Career ==
His science fiction romance Passengers was included on the 2007 Black List of unproduced high-value screenplays. At the request of Keanu Reeves and Stephen Hamel, Relativity Media co-founder Lynwood Spinks had hired Spaihts to write the film after Reeves originally became attached to Spaihts's abandoned science fiction script Shadow 19. After Reeves agreed to produce with Hamel and star in Passengers, Spaihts was commissioned by Scott Free to write the next installments in the Alien saga, two prequel films to be directed by Ridley Scott, which eventually turned into the more autonomous story Prometheus, ultimately revised by Damon Lindelof. For New Regency Spaihts also wrote the screenplay to the alien invasion thriller The Darkest Hour, based on a story by Leslie Bohem and M. T. Ahern.

Spaihts has worked on a film version of St. George and the Dragon for Sony Pictures, and originated a Disney film project called Children of Mars. In 2012 he entered a two-picture deal at Jerry Bruckheimer Films to adapt Ashley Wood's graphic novel World War Robot and write a space adventure film based on his own original pitch.

He co-wrote the script for Marvel Studios' 2016 live action Doctor Strange film. Spaihts also co-wrote the reboot of The Mummy franchise for Universal, directed by Alex Kurtzman.

In 2013, Spaihts began work on the story for the Black Hole remake by Walt Disney Studios. The rights to his early science fiction screenplay had originally been sold to the Weinstein Company, with Keanu Reeves and Reese Witherspoon set to star, and Game of Thrones director Brian Kirk at the helm. The project was later made into the 2016 film Passengers by Sony Pictures, produced by Original Film and Company Films, directed by Morten Tyldum, and starring Jennifer Lawrence and Chris Pratt.

In 2018, it was revealed that Spaihts would be co-writing Legendary Pictures's feature film adaptation of the science fiction novel Dune, alongside Eric Roth and director Denis Villeneuve. For his work on Dune, Spaihts was nominated alongside Roth and Villeneuve for the Academy Award for Best Adapted Screenplay.

== Personal life ==
He has written several books for The Princeton Review. Spaihts lives and works in Venice, California, and is married to actress Johanna Watts. He is also a photographer.

== Filmography ==
| Year | Title | Writer | Executive producer | Director | Notes |
|---|---|---|---|---|---|
| 2011 | The Darkest Hour | Yes | No | Chris Gorak | |
| 2012 | Prometheus | Yes | No | Ridley Scott | |
| 2016 | Doctor Strange | Yes | No | Scott Derrickson | |
| 2016 | Passengers | Yes | Yes | Morten Tyldum | Also voiced "Autodoc" |
| 2017 | The Mummy | Story | No | Alex Kurtzman | |
| 2021 | Dune | Yes | Yes | Denis Villeneuve | Nominated — Academy Award for Best Adapted Screenplay |
| 2024 | Dune: Part Two | Yes | Yes | Denis Villeneuve | |
| 2024 | The Crow | No | Yes | Rupert Sanders | |
| 2026 | Dune: Part Three | Uncredited | Yes | Denis Villeneuve | Post-production |

Additional literary material

- A Minecraft Movie (2025)
