= List of 2012 box office number-one films in Colombia =

This is a list of films which have placed number one at the weekend box office for the year 2012 in Colombia.

== Number-one films ==
Mi gente linda, mi gente bella became the highest grossing film of 2012.

#	Date	Film	Gross	Notes
1	January 8, 2012	The Adventures of Tintin: The Secret of the Unicorn	$460,203	
2	January 15, 2012	The Darkest Hour	$430,945	
3	January 22, 2012	Underworld: Awakening	$550,127	
4	January 29, 2012	Immortals	$389,502	
5	February 5, 2012	Immortals	$357,368	
6	February 12, 2012	Cara Oculta	$254,003	
7	February 19, 2012	Journey 2: The Mysterious Island	$891,588	
8	February 26, 2012	Journey 2: The Mysterious Island	$687,943	
9	March 4, 2012	Journey 2: The Mysterious Island	$612,244	
10	March 11, 2012	John Carter	$532,882	
11	March 18, 2012	John Carter	$450,779	
12	March 25, 2012	The Hunger Games	$484,504	
13	April 1, 2012	Wrath of the Titans	$1,247,696	
14	April 8, 2012	Wrath of the Titans	$1,001,222	
15	April 15, 2012	Wrath of the Titans	$604,147	
16	April 22, 2012	Titanic 3D	$348,496	
17	April 29, 2012	The Avengers	$2,314,014	
18	May 6, 2012	The Avengers	$1,965,308	
19	May 13, 2012	The Avengers	$1,115,673	
20	May 20, 2012	The Avengers	$1,154,460	
21	May 27, 2012	Men in Black 3	$1,502,480	
22	June 3, 2012	Snow White and the huntsman	$893,447	
23	June 10, 2012	Madagascar 3 :Europe most wanted	$1,582,031	
24	June 17, 2012	Prometheus	$1,285,635	
25	June 24, 2012	Prometheus	$1,189,704	
26	July 1, 2012	Ice Age 4 :Continental Drift	$2,879,788	
27	July 8, 2012	The Amazing Spider-Man	$2,051,123	
28	July 15, 2012	Ice Age 4 :Continental Drift	$1,573,782	
29	July 22, 2012	Brave	$1,304,074	
30	July 29, 2012	The Dark knight	$1,373,906	
31	August 5, 2012	The Dark knight	$1,185,189	
32	August 12, 2012	The Dark knight	$717,115	
33	August 19, 2012	ParaNorman	$509,962	
34	August 26, 2012	The Dark knight	$334,839	
35	September 2, 2012	Abraham Lincoln: Vampire Hunter	$472,285	
36	September 9, 2012	The Secret of the Gods	$297,799	
37	September 16, 2012	Resident Evil: Retribution	$1,061,247	
38	September 23, 2012	Resident Evil: Retribution	$681,049	
39	September 30, 2012	Resident Evil: Retribution	$451,708	
40	October 7, 2012	Hotel Transylvania	$856,071	
41	October 14, 2012	Hotel Transylvania	$923,586	
42	October 21, 2012	Hotel Transylvania	$612,563	
43	October 28, 2012	Hotel Transylvania	$388,453	
44	November 4, 2012	Skyfall	$714,768	
45	November 11, 2012	Skyfall	$546,248	
46	November 18, 2012	The Twilight Saga: Breaking Dawn - Part 2	$2,111,538	
47	November 25, 2012	The Twilight Saga: Breaking Dawn - Part 2	$1,083,204	
48	December 2, 2012	Rise of the Guardians	$640,594	
49	December 9, 2012	Rise of the Guardians	$516,197	
50	December 16, 2012	The Hobbit: An Unexpected Journey	$1,069,741	
51	December 23, 2012	The Hobbit: An Unexpected Journey	$993,111	
