= Whatever It Takes (Imagine Dragons song) =

Single by Imagine Dragons

from the album Evolve
- B-side: "Thunder" (official remix)
- Released: May 9, 2017
- Genre: Arena rock; R&B
- Length: 3:21
- Label: Kidinakorner; Interscope
- Songwriters: Dan Reynolds; Wayne Sermon; Ben McKee; Daniel Platzman; Joel Little
- Producer: Joel Little

Imagine Dragons singles chronology
"Thunder" (2017)	"Whatever It Takes" (2017)	"Next to Me" (2018)

Music video
- "Whatever It Takes" on YouTube

"Whatever It Takes" is a song by American pop rock band Imagine Dragons. The song was released on May 9, 2017, as a promotional single through Kidinakorner and Interscope. It later became the third single from the band's third studio album, Evolve, on October 6, 2017. It was also the official theme song for WWE's PPV event Battleground, in addition to its inclusion in the video game Madden NFL 18. The song was sent to US contemporary hit radio on February 13, 2018.

== Background ==
The song was announced alongside the name and album art of Evolve via Twitter on May 9, 2017.

== Music video ==
A music video for the song was released on October 12, 2017. It was directed by Matt Eastin and Aaron Hymes. Eastin had also previously directed the music videos for Imagine Dragons' songs "On Top of the World", "Roots", and "Believer". The video begins with lead singer Dan Reynolds swimming through a room filled with water. You can see matchbooks reading "The Overlook Hotel" and "Mt. Qualo, Colorado, references to 'The Shining'. It then cuts to a scene in which Reynolds and the band are playing in the same room; however, it is not filled with water in this scene. As they perform the chorus of the song, the roof crumbles and rain starts pouring in. Throughout the video, the rain persists and the room eventually fills completely with water. However, the band still plays. As Reynolds sings, objects such as boxing gloves and keys float by him along with two people who are seemingly sirens, tugging at him from both sides. Before the final chorus, the music stops and the band floats lifelessly on the water. When they break into song again, the stage has completely changed as the room is no longer underwater, but on fire as the band plays on it. As the video ends, everything is on fire and the music stops. The video won the MTV Video Music Award for Best Rock Video award. On February 12, 2025, the video surpassed one billion views on YouTube.

== Live performances ==
In October 2017, Imagine Dragons performed the song on Late Night with Seth Meyers.

On May 30, 2018, they performed the song live before game two of the 2018 Stanley Cup Final at T-Mobile Arena in their hometown of Las Vegas.

== Usage in media ==
In February 2018, Imagine Dragons asked Conservative Political Action Conference to stop using "Whatever It Takes" on their conference website.

The National Basketball Association (NBA)'s Utah Jazz frequently play the song prior to tip-off of every home game at Delta Center in Salt Lake City, Utah.

== Critical reception ==
The Guardian writes that "Whatever It Takes" was "written with a sports highlights package in mind ("I love the adrenaline in my veins", wails frontman Dan Reynolds, before chart pop's current obligatory chorus of "woah-ohs" enters)."

== Commercial performance ==
As of May 15, 2018, the song has peaked at number 12 on the Billboard Hot 100.

== Track listing ==
Digital download
No.	Title	Length
1.	"Whatever It Takes"	3:21

CD single
No.	Title	Length
1.	"Whatever It Takes"	3:22
2.	"Thunder" (official remix)	3:17

== Charts ==
=== Weekly charts ===
Chart (2017–2018)	Peak position
Argentina Anglo (Monitor Latino)	16
Australia (ARIA)	34
Austria (Ö3 Austria Top 40)	8
Belarus Airplay (Eurofest)	1
Belgium (Ultratop 50 Flanders)	9
Belgium (Ultratop 50 Wallonia)	8
Canada Hot 100 (Billboard)	26
CIS Airplay (TopHit)	1
Czech Republic Airplay (ČNS IFPI)	4
Czech Republic Singles Digital (ČNS IFPI)	7
France (SNEP)	37
Germany (GfK)	7
Hungary (Single Top 40)	13
Hungary (Stream Top 40)	24
Ireland (IRMA)	86
Italy (FIMI)	9
Lebanon (Lebanese Top 20)	15
Netherlands (Dutch Top 40)	11
Netherlands (Single Top 100)	40
New Zealand Heatseekers (RMNZ)	5
Poland Airplay (ZPAV)	3
Portugal (AFP)	48
Russia Airplay (TopHit)	3
Scottish Singles Sales (Official Charts)	61
Slovakia Airplay (ČNS IFPI)	1
Slovakia Singles Digital (ČNS IFPI)	21
Slovenia (SloTop50)	5
Sweden (Sverigetopplistan)	85
Switzerland (Schweizer Hitparade)	6
UK Singles (Official Charts)	93
Ukraine Airplay (TopHit)	2
US Billboard Hot 100	12
US Adult Contemporary (Billboard)	14
US Adult Pop Airplay (Billboard)	1
US Pop Airplay (Billboard)	3
US Hot Rock & Alternative Songs (Billboard)	1
US Rock & Alternative Airplay (Billboard)	1

=== Year-end charts ===
Chart (2017)	Position
Germany (Official German Charts)	95
Hungary (Single Top 40)	98
Netherlands (Dutch Top 40)	66
US Hot Rock Songs (Billboard)	16
Chart (2018)	Position
Belgium (Ultratop Flanders)	39
Belgium (Ultratop Wallonia)	63
Canada (Canadian Hot 100)	38
CIS (Tophit)	15
France (SNEP)	73
Germany (Official German Charts)	86
Hungary (Single Top 40)	58
Iceland (Plötutíóindi)	61
Italy (FIMI)	56
Netherlands (Dutch Top 40)	97
Portugal (AFP)	99
Russia (Tophit)	15
Slovenia (SloTop50)	14
Switzerland (Schweizer Hitparade)	23
US Billboard Hot 100	37
US Radio Songs (Billboard)	21
US Adult Contemporary (Billboard)	36
US Adult Top 40 (Billboard)	4
US Hot Rock Songs (Billboard)	4
US Mainstream Top 40 (Billboard)	31
US Rock Airplay (Billboard)	3

=== Decade-end charts ===
Chart (2010–2019)	Position
US Hot Rock Songs (Billboard)	21

== Certifications ==
Region	Certification	Certified units/sales
Australia (ARIA)	Platinum	70,000^{‡}
Austria (IFPI Austria)	Platinum	30,000^{‡}
Belgium (BRMA)	Gold	10,000^{‡}
Brazil (Pro-Música Brasil)	Diamond	250,000^{‡}
Canada (Music Canada)	2× Platinum	160,000^{‡}
Denmark (IFPI Danmark)	Platinum	90,000^{‡}
France (SNEP)	Diamond	333,333^{‡}
Germany (BVMI)	3× Gold	600,000^{‡}
Italy (FIMI)	3× Platinum	150,000^{‡}
New Zealand (RMNZ)	4× Platinum	120,000^{‡}
Norway (IFPI Norway)	Gold	30,000^{‡}
Poland (ZPAV)	4× Platinum	200,000^{‡}
Portugal (AFP)	Gold	5,000^{‡}
Spain (Promusicae)	Platinum	60,000^{‡}
United Kingdom (BPI)	Platinum	600,000^{‡}
United States (RIAA)	7× Platinum	7,000,000^{‡}
Streaming
Sweden (GLF)	Platinum	8,000,000^{†}
^{‡} Sales+streaming figures based on certification alone.^{†} Streaming-only figures based on certification alone.

== Release history ==
Region	Date	Format	Label	Ref.
Various (Note: Release as a promotional single.)	May 9, 2017	Digital download	Kidinakorner; Interscope	
United Kingdom	October 6, 2017	Contemporary hit radio	Kidinakorner; Interscope	
United Kingdom	October 20, 2017	Digital download	Kidinakorner; Interscope	
United States	November 14, 2017	Adult album alternative radio	Kidinakorner; Interscope	
Germany	November 17, 2017	CD single	Interscope; Universal	
United States	December 5, 2017	Alternative radio	Kidinakorner; Interscope	
United States	February 13, 2018	Contemporary hit radio	Kidinakorner; Interscope	
