= Veronika Vernadskaya =

Russian actress (born 1995)

- Вероника Владимировна Вернадская
- Born: Veronika Vladimirovna Vernadskaya; 7 May 1995 (age 31); Moscow, Russia
- Education: VGIK
- Occupation: Actress
- Years active: 2006–present
- Height: 172 cm (5 ft 8 in)
- Partner: Andrey Tsisaruk

Veronika Vladimirovna Vernadskaya (Russian: Вероника Владимировна Вернадская, born 7 May 1995) is a Russian actress known for her roles in the Russian-American film "The Darkest Hour" and the film "Mukha".

== Biography ==
Educated at the Theatre of the Young Muscovites on Sparrow Hills and the Moscow Art Theatre School, Vernadskaya started her career in Russian television series and is trilingual, speaking Russian, French and English. Later she studied at the acting faculty of New York Film Academy. Graduated from VGIK as a film director.

== Selected filmography ==
Year	Title	Role	Notes
2007	Volkova Hour	Nastya	TV series (fourth season)
2008	Mukha	Lena	
2009	Scarecrow – 2	"Romashka"	TV series
2009	Suicide: Particularly dangerous	Galka	TV series
2009	Clever beauty	Anya	
2010	Love and other nonsense	Zhenya	TV series (2nd series)
2010	Cherkizon. Disposable people		TV series
2010	Escape	episode	TV series
2011	The Darkest Hour	Vika	
2012	No statute of limitations	Lyudmila Slashcheva	TV series
2013	Love does not love	Lёlya	
2013	Puppeteers	Alla	TV mini-series
2013	Deliverance	Katya	
2014	Insomnia	Irina Konstantinova	TV series
2014	Zemsky doctor. Love contrary	Sveta	TV series
2014	Love in Big City 3	Tanya	
2015	Stonewall	Marianne Winters	
2016	Mystic Game	Inga	
