= Right at Your Door =

- Theatrical release juggler
- Directed by: Chris Gorak
- Written by: Chris Gorak
- Produced by: Palmer West; Jonah Smith
- Starring: Mary McCormack; Rory Cochrane; Scotty Noyd, Jr.; Max Kasch; Will McCormack
- Cinematography: Tom Richmond
- Edited by: Jeffrey M. Werner
- Music by: tomandandy
- Production company: Thousand Words
- Distributed by: Roadside Attractions
- Release dates: January 23, 2006 (Sundance Film Festival); August 24, 2007 (United States)
- Running time: 90 minutes
- Country: United States
- Language: English
- Box office: $2 million

Right at Your Door is a 2006 American thriller film about a couple and follows the events surrounding them when multiple dirty bombs detonate in Los Angeles. Chris Gorak both wrote the screenplay and directed the film in his writing and directorial debuts. It was first screened at the Sundance Film Festival in January 2006, where it won the award for Excellence in Cinematography.

== Plot ==
Brad, an out-of-work musician, is home by himself one morning while his wife, Lexi, is at work. He hears on the radio that several suspected dirty bombs have been detonated across Los Angeles, and sees large amounts of smoke rising from the city. Brad tries to contact Lexi through her cell phone, but only receives a busy signal, and when he tries to drive out to find her, he discovers that all roads now have police blockades, forcing him to return home.

Once home, Brad sees Alvaro in the house. Alvaro asks Brad if he can stay with him as there is no one at the neighbor's house where he was working. Over the radio, they hear that survivors of the blasts are being quarantined due to the bombs' deadly toxins, and that the authorities advise people to seal up their homes before the toxins reach them. Brad and Alvaro then proceed to seal up the house with duct tape and plastic. As it becomes increasingly obvious that Lexi might not come home, he takes some of Lexi's clothes and leaves them outside the back door with some food and water.

Lexi arrives home, covered in dust from the explosions, causing Brad to refuse to let her in. Lexi loses her temper and throws her cell phone at the door, breaking a window pane. Brad and Alvaro quickly seal the breakage and manage to calm Lexi down, before then sealing off the main bedroom from the rest of the house so that Lexi can get into it. Lexi receives a call from her mother, who realizes that she was near the explosion and is probably infected, but Lexi refuses to believe that there is any danger. Alvaro decides to leave the house, saying he needs to be with his wife. Brad tries to convince him to stay, but Alvaro leaves anyway and is seen slowly walking away through a downpour of toxic ash.

Lexi hears a noise from the back and alerts Brad. A masked man appears, who introduces himself as Rick. He tells Lexi that there is a ship on the coast that has medical supplies and is helping people. Lexi and Rick leave for help, and Brad hears newscasts on the radio that elaborate on the unknown viral strain, saying it is a hybrid which attacks the respiratory system. That same night Brad is visited by Corporal Marshall and his men. He asks Brad several questions, such as how well his house has been sealed, who else is currently or recently been there, and if there has been any contact between him and anyone on the outside. Brad mentions the phone that Lexi threw at the door window and the Corporal demands a sample of the dust off the phone. He tells Brad that he will soon be back with the results and that his wife under no circumstances should be let into the house.

Lexi returns home the next day without Rick, and sees a red tag placed outside the house. She calls her brother, Jason, so that she can have someone to talk to due to her mother being frantic with worry. The next couple of hours are spent with Brad and Lexi on their respective sides of the door, who talk about what they will do assuming they survive. Soldiers suddenly appear, grab Lexi, and prevent Brad from coming outside. One soldier manages to calm Brad down and explains that the virus has been discovered not to thrive in places with large quantities of fresh air, meaning that the number of fatalities from the attack has actually been minimal.

Unfortunately, because Lexi angrily introduced a trace amount of the virus into the house when she broke the window, Brad's sealing off the house has created the perfect environment for it to thrive, meaning that he has been lethally exposed. The soldiers prepare to fill the house with powerful fumigation chemicals in order to eliminate any trace of the virus; Lexi protests that Brad is still inside, but is told that Brad will soon be dead no matter what they do. The house is then filled with the chemicals, killing Brad. Lexi is later seen sitting in an ambulance, being attended to by a nurse. The film ends with Lexi in too much shock to say anything, her cell phone ringing.

== Cast ==
- Mary McCormack as Lexi
- Rory Cochrane as Brad
- Tony Perez as Alvaro
- Scotty Noyd, Jr. as Timmy
- Jon Huertas as Rick
- Max Kasch as Corporal Marshall

== Reception ==
On the review aggregator website Rotten Tomatoes, 68% of 57 critics' reviews are positive, with an average rating of 6.5/10. The website's consensus reads: "Though Right at Your Door dips into melodrama at the end, it's an otherwise tense, effective, and eerily plausible doomsday scenario." Metacritic, which uses a weighted average, assigned the film a score of 57 out of 100, based on 17 critics, indicating "mixed or average" reviews.
