= Stonewall (2015 film) =

Film directed by Roland Emmerich

- Theatrical release poster
- Directed by: Roland Emmerich
- Written by: Jon Robin Baitz
- Produced by: Roland Emmerich; Marc Frydman; Michael Fossat; Carsten Lorenz
- Starring: Jeremy Irvine; Jonny Beauchamp; Joey King; Caleb Landry Jones; Matt Craven; Jonathan Rhys Meyers; Ron Perlman
- Cinematography: Markus Förderer
- Edited by: Adam Wolfe
- Music by: Rob Simonsen
- Production company: Centropolis Entertainment
- Distributed by: Roadside Attractions
- Release dates: September 18, 2015 (TIFF); September 25, 2015 (United States)
- Running time: 129 minutes
- Country: United States
- Language: English
- Box office: $292,669

Stonewall is a 2015 American coming-of-age drama film directed by Roland Emmerich, written by Jon Robin Baitz, and starring Jeremy Irvine, Jonny Beauchamp, Joey King, Caleb Landry Jones, Matt Craven, Jonathan Rhys Meyers, and Ron Perlman. The film is set in and around the 1969 Stonewall riots, a violent clash with police that sparked the gay liberation movement in New York City. Released on September 25, 2015, by Roadside Attractions, it received largely negative reviews.

== Plot ==
Shortly before fleeing the conservative countryside in the late 1960s and moving to New York City, Danny Winters, a gay boy from Indiana, is discovered by friends while making love with his boyfriend. His father is upset, and while his mother is ambivalent as she loves her son, she does not stand up to her husband either. His father then refuses to sign Danny's scholarship application for Columbia University where Danny has been accepted, but Danny departs for New York anyway, leaving behind his supportive little sister, Phoebe.

After reaching Christopher Street in Greenwich Village, he is befriended by a multiracial group of young, gay, and genderfluid street people and drag queens. He witnesses police violence against his new friends. Danny goes with his friends to the Stonewall Inn, a gay bar, and is asked for a dance by a man, Trevor, who is a member of the Mattachine Society, a homophile rights group. Later that night, the police raid the bar and arrest some customers, including Danny's new friend, Ray. Danny, who did not get arrested because he was not cross-dressing, meets up with Ray at the police station the next day. Danny, with no job prospects, tries prostitution and receives oral sex from another man. Danny then goes to a meeting of the Mattachine Society, who work to advance gay rights through conforming to mainstream society and working within the system rather than through radicalism. There he finds Trevor and, though their politics differ, they end up spending the night together.

Danny soon finds Trevor with another man, and, heartbroken, he decides to leave the Village. Immediately after, he is abducted and forcibly sent out to a high-class prostitution business, at the direction of Ed Murphy, who runs the Stonewall Inn. Murphy has colluded with corrupt policemen and exploited homeless gay youth. Danny escapes, aided by Ray and the two go to the bar to confront Murphy. The police then raid the bar and arrest some customers again. Danny is thrown onto the street as well as the rest of the customers, and, despite Trevor attempting to stop him, hurls a brick into one of the bar's windows, screaming "Gay power!" This incites the crowd to attack the police, who lock themselves up in the bar in response.

One year later, after finishing his first year at the university, Danny returns to his parents' home and tells his sister that he is going to attend the gay liberation march on Christopher Street. The film ends on the day of the march. Danny is marching in the street with his friends. He looks over at the sidewalk and sees that his mother and sister have come to support him.

== Cast ==
- Jeremy Irvine as Danny Winters
- Jonny Beauchamp as Ray/Ramona
- Joey King as Phoebe Winters
- Caleb Landry Jones as Orphan Annie
- Matt Craven as Seymour Pine
- David Cubitt as Coach Winters
- Vladimir Alexis as Queen Cong
- Ben Sullivan as Quiet Paul
- Alexandre Nachi as Little Lee
- Andrea Frankle as Joyce Winters
- Patrick Garrow as Bob Kohler
- Jonathan Rhys Meyers as Trevor
- Ron Perlman as Ed Murphy
- Atticus Mitchell as Matthew
- Karl Glusman as Joe
- Otoja Abit as Marsha P. Johnson
- Mark Camacho as Fat Tony
- Jo Vannicola as Sam
- Yan England as Terry
- Arthur Holden as Frank Kameny
- Veronika Vernadskaya as Marianne Winters
- Richard Jutras as Queen Tooey

== Production ==
In April 2013, Emmerich spoke about the film, saying: "I may want to do a little movie—about $12–14 million—about the Stonewall riots in New York. It's about these crazy kids in New York, and a country bumpkin who gets into their gang, and at the end they start this riot and change the world." On March 31, 2014, the producers announced it would film in Montreal. Emmerich said that he got interested in the project while making Anonymous, where two friends asked if he would ever do a film on the Stonewall riots. Through his involvement with the Gay and Lesbian Center in Los Angeles, Emmerich did a fundraiser for their homeless youth program, he found the idea for the protagonist in seeing countryside migrants who move to the big city only to find themselves in unfavorable conditions of homelessness, drug abuse and prostitution, and asked screenwriter Jon Robin Baitz, who Emmerich hired after seeing his play Other Desert Cities, to do a script centered around such a character, a man who after being uncloseted and shunned "has to find a family at the most unlikely place in these other kids".

On April 9, 2014, Irvine joined the cast of the film. On June 3, 2014, Rhys Meyers, Perlman, and King joined the cast. Principal photography began on June 3, 2014, in Montreal. Emmerich initially wanted to shoot in New York; however, he changed the venue after finding it too expensive.

== Release ==
On March 25, 2015, Roadside Attractions acquired North American distribution rights. In July 2015, Roadside set a September 25, 2015 release date.

=== Controversy ===
Prior to release, the promotional trailer was criticized by many for what they felt was its lack of representation of the full diversity of people who were involved in the uprising, in particular people of color, drag queens, butch lesbians and transgender people. Emmerich responded to the controversy, saying, "The film is racially and sexually far more diverse than some people appear to think."

Irvine, who plays the lead role, denied that key historical figures have been omitted or whitewashed. "To anyone with concerns about the diversity of the #StonewallMovie, I saw the movie for the 1st time last week and can assure you all that it represents almost every race and division of society that was so fundamental to one of the most noteworthy civil rights movements in living history," Irvine wrote on his Instagram account. "Marsha P. Johnson is a major part of the movie, and although 1st hand accounts of who threw the 1st brick in the riots vary wildly, it is a fictional black transvestite character, played by the very talented Vladimir Alexis, who pulls out the 1st brick in the riot scene," he continued.

Responding to the criticism the film itself received, Emmerich said of his casting choice: "I didn't make this movie only for gay people, I made it also for straight people... As a director you have to put yourself in your movies, and I'm white and gay."

Later in 2015, those who protested against the film were listed as one of the nine runners-up for The Advocate's Person of the Year.

In 2016, Emmerich blamed the failure on "one voice on the internet who saw a trailer and said, this is whitewashing Stonewall. Stonewall was a white event, let's be honest. But nobody wanted to hear that any more."

=== Box office ===
The film opened to $112,414 with 127 locations, for an "abysmal" per-theater average of $871.

=== Critical reception ===
On review aggregator website Rotten Tomatoes, Stonewall has a 9% rating based on 76 reviews. The site's consensus states: "As an ordinary coming-of-age drama, Stonewall is merely dull and scattered—but as an attempt to depict a pivotal moment in American history, it's offensively bad." Metacritic reports that, based on 27 critics, the film has a normalized score of 30 out of 100, indicating "generally unfavorable reviews".

Writing for Vanity Fair, Richard Lawson described the film as "maddeningly, stultifyingly bungled", the script as "alarmingly clunky" and featuring "production design that makes late 1960s Christopher Street look like Sesame Street". Lawson faults the director for taking "one of the most politically charged periods of the last century" and making it into "a bland, facile coming-of-age story", and says that the role of Marsha P. Johnson was "played as comic relief, flatly". According to Lawson, the treatment of Johnson is part of a wider lack of respect for non-white and "non-butch" characters in the movie; he believes they are treated with "only a minimal, pat-on-the-head kind of attention", showing the riots through a "white, bizarrely heteronormative lens".

In The New York Times, Stephen Holden wrote that the film "does a reasonably good job of evoking the heady mixture of wildness and dread that permeated Greenwich Village street life" but that "its invention of a generic white knight who prompted the riots by hurling the first brick into a window is tantamount to stealing history from the people who made it". Writing for Gawker in a piece entitled "There Aren't Enough Bricks in the World to Throw at Roland Emmerich's Appalling Stonewall", Rich Juzwiak wrote that the film is "formally inconsistent" and "teaches you about as much about being gay as the Aristocats taught you about being an aristocrat." Michael Phillips of the Chicago Tribune wrote that, while Emmerich "has made a movie even less historically accurate than 10,000 BC", the most fatal problem of the film is that it "embrace[s] every wrong cliche", which "in the desperate lack of nuance afflict[s] nearly every performance." Maya Stanton wrote in Entertainment Weekly, "Roland Emmerich has taken a seminal moment in gay rights history and reduced it to mere background for a coming-of-age story we've seen before ... Emmerich and screenwriter Jon Robin Baitz could have focused on real-life participants (the filmmakers had been accused of whitewashing history since the trailer debuted) or explored any number of themes that would've been more compelling than 'pretty white kid comes out, struggles.' The subject matter deserves better, and so do we."

=== Veteran response ===
Stonewall veteran Mark Segal, writing for the PBS NewsHour said,

Stonewall is uninterested in any history that doesn't revolve around its white, male, stereotypically attractive protagonist. It almost entirely leaves out the women who participated in the riots and helped create the Gay Liberation Front, which included youth, trans people, lesbian separatists and people from all other parts of the spectrum of our community.

Speaking to The Guardian, Stonewall historian David Carter called the film "a very lame and inaccurate portrayal." Another Stonewall veteran Thomas Lanigan-Schmidt also denounced the inaccuracy in terms of the characters' choices, its production design, etc., while acknowledging "the street kids being the main engine of things" and the extent to which the police were violent against homosexuals to be accurate.

== See also ==
- Before Stonewall: The Making of a Gay and Lesbian Community (1984), a documentary of the decades leading up to the Stonewall uprising
- Stonewall (1995), another fictional presentation of the events leading up to the riots
- After Stonewall (1999), a documentary of the years from Stonewall to century's end
- Stonewall Uprising (2010), a documentary presentation using archival footage, photographs, documents and witness statements
- List of lesbian, gay, bisexual or transgender-related films of 2015
- White savior narrative in film
- Whitewashing in film
