= Levitate (Imagine Dragons song) =

2016 song by Imagine Dragons

Single by Imagine Dragons

from the album Evolve (Deluxe edition)
- Released: December 2, 2016
- Length: 3:18
- Label: Kidinakorner; Interscope
- Songwriters: Dan Reynolds; Wayne Sermon; Ben McKee; Daniel Platzman; Tim Randolph
- Producer: Randolph

Imagine Dragons singles chronology
"Sucker for Pain" (2016)	"Levitate" (2016)	"Believer" (2017)

Audio
- "Levitate" on YouTube

"Levitate" is a song by American pop rock band Imagine Dragons. The song was released through Kidinakorner and Interscope on December 2, 2016 from the Sony Pictures film Passengers. The song is also featured on the deluxe edition of the band's third studio album Evolve.

== Background and composition ==
"Levitate" was written by band members Dan Reynolds, Wayne Sermon, Ben McKee, Daniel Platzman as well as Tim Randolph who also produced the track. The song is a synth-pop song with the lyrics referencing the themes of loneliness, inevitability, and romance of Passengers. The title of the song, "Levitate", references the characters' spacewalk scene.

== Music video ==
The music video for "Levitate" premiered on November 28, 2016 on the Sony Pictures Entertainment YouTube channel. The video features clips from Passengers of Jim Preston (Chris Pratt) and Aurora Lane (Jennifer Lawrence) showing their romance and adventures aboard their sleeper ship.

== Personnel ==
Credits for "Levitate" adapted from Apple Music.

Musicians

- Dan Reynolds – lead vocals, composition
- Wayne Sermon – guitar, composition
- Ben McKee – bass guitar, composition
- Daniel Platzman – drums, composition
- Tim Randolph – production, composition

== Charts ==
Chart performance for "Levitate"
Chart (2021)	Peak position
US Hot Rock & Alternative Songs (Billboard)	19
