= Passengers (2016 film) =

American science fiction film by Morten Tyldum

- Theatrical release poster
- Directed by: Morten Tyldum
- Written by: Jon Spaihts
- Produced by: Stephen Hamel; Michael Maher; Neal H. Moritz; Ori Marmur
- Starring: Jennifer Lawrence; Chris Pratt; Michael Sheen; Laurence Fishburne; Andy Garcia
- Cinematography: Rodrigo Prieto
- Edited by: Maryann Brandon
- Music by: Thomas Newman
- Production companies: Columbia Pictures; Village Roadshow Pictures; Start Motion Pictures; Original Film; Company Films; LStar Capital; Wanda Pictures
- Distributed by: Sony Pictures Releasing
- Release dates: December 14, 2016 (Regency Village Theater); December 21, 2016 (United States)
- Running time: 116 minutes
- Country: United States
- Language: English
- Budget: $110–150 million
- Box office: $303 million

Passengers is a 2016 American science fiction romance film directed by Morten Tyldum, written by Jon Spaihts and starring Jennifer Lawrence and Chris Pratt. The supporting cast includes Michael Sheen, Laurence Fishburne, and Andy Garcia. The film follows two passengers on an interstellar spacecraft carrying thousands of people to a colony on a 120-year journey from Earth (Note: At half the speed of light, this equates to a distance of roughly 69.2 light-years.), when the two are awakened 90 years early from their suspended hibernation.

The script was written by Spaihts in 2007, but languished in development, with multiple actors attached to it over the years until Sony Pictures Entertainment acquired the rights in late 2014. Fishburne, Pratt and Tyldum joined the project shortly thereafter, and filming took place from September 2015 to February 2016 in Atlanta.

Passengers premiered at the Regency Village Theater in Los Angeles on December 14, 2016, and was released theatrically in the United States by Sony Pictures Releasing on December 21. The film received mixed reviews from critics, although the performances of Lawrence and Pratt were praised, and grossed $303 million against a $110–150 million budget. It was nominated for Best Original Score and Best Production Design at the 89th Academy Awards.

== Plot ==
In the distant future, the Avalon, a sleeper ship transporting 5,000 colonists and 258 crew in hibernation pods, is traveling from Earth to the planet Homestead II, a 120-year journey as part of a wave of space colonization to escape the overpopulated and heavily urbanized Earth. Only 30 years into the voyage, an asteroid collision damages the ship, causing a malfunction that awakens passenger Jim Preston, a mechanical engineer, 90 years ahead of schedule. He is unable to return to hibernation, and cannot contact Earth for help due to an overly long communication delay. He attempts to break into the crew hibernation room, in the hopes they will be able to help. He fails due to the ship's heavy security systems.

As the ship's AI systems seem unable to comprehend a hibernation pod malfunction, as it had never happened before, Jim eventually gives up, passing the time in several of the ship's entertainment zones.

After a year of isolation, with only an android bartender named Arthur for company, Jim grows despondent. He contemplates suicide until noticing Aurora Lane, a young woman inside a pod. He considers reviving her for companionship, but struggles doing so, knowing it is morally wrong and will preclude her intended life and career as a writer on their destination planet.

Jim eventually awakens Aurora, letting her believe it was a malfunction. Devastated at having to live out her life on the ship, she tries to reenter hibernation. Resigned to the situation, she begins writing about her experience.

Over the next year, the two fall in love. Just before Jim intends to propose to Aurora, Arthur inadvertently reveals the truth about her awakening. Distraught and enraged, Aurora berates, shuns, and physically attacks Jim. She furiously rejects his apologies and avoids contact with him.

Sometime later, another pod failure awakens Gus Mancuso, a deck chief officer. Using Gus's employee code, the group enters the bridge and discovers cascading failures in the ship's systems. If left unrepaired, the ship will fail, dooming the passengers and crew.

While missing their home planet Earth, in order to create a fulfilling meaningful life and a home inside the cold metallic atmosphere of the spaceship, Jim planted a small tree in the main hall. Gus tells him that it is forbidden planting inside the spaceship.

When Gus falls critically ill, the ship's automated medical suite, the Autodoc, diagnoses pansystemic necrosis and gives him hours to live. He attributes it to his hibernation pod's multiple failures. Before dying, Gus gives Jim and Aurora his ID badge and employee code to get into crew-only areas.

Jim and Aurora find hull breaches from the asteroid collision two years earlier. The computer module administering the ship's fusion reactor power plant has been damaged, causing the cascading malfunctions as the other systems' computing power was diverted in an attempt to maintain it.

They replace the damaged module, but when the computer attempts to vent the reactor to extinguish a runaway plasma reaction, the exterior vent fails. Jim is forced to spacewalk and vent the plasma from outside, using the manual controls in the vent tube.

Jim discovers that he must remain in the tube to keep the vent open while Aurora initiates venting from inside the ship. Revealing her feelings for him, she admits she is terrified of losing him and being alone.

Jim improvises a heat shield and survives the venting, but is blasted into space as his tether snaps and his damaged spacesuit begins losing oxygen. Aurora retrieves a clinically dead Jim from space and resuscitates him in the Autodoc. The Avalon, its reactor repaired, returns to normal operations.

After burying Gus in space, Jim learns the Autodoc can function as a hibernation pod for one person, so he insists that Aurora use it for the remainder of the voyage. Realizing she would never see Jim again, she chooses to remain awake with him.

Eighty-eight years later, the ship's crew awaken on schedule, shortly before arrival at Homestead II. In the ship's grand concourse, they discover that the tree that was planted by Jim earlier has grown huge with trailing vines, creating a lush vegetation around it, and a small cabin. A recording of Aurora's story describes the wonderful life she and Jim shared on the Avalon and created their home on it.

== Cast ==
- Chris Pratt as James "Jim" Preston, a mechanical engineer
- Jennifer Lawrence as Aurora Lane, a journalist and writer
- Michael Sheen as Arthur, an android bartender on the Avalon
- Laurence Fishburne as Gus Mancuso, the chief deck officer
- Andy Garcia (in a non-speaking role) as Captain Norris, commanding officer of the Avalon
- Julee Cerda and Nazanin Boniadi as hologram instructors
- Aurora Perrineau as Celeste, Aurora's best friend seen in a video message

Emma Clarke, Chris Edgerly, Matt Corboy, Fred Melamed, and screenwriter Jon Spaihts voice the Avalon, InfoMat, video game, observatory, and Autodoc, respectively.

== Production ==
=== Development ===
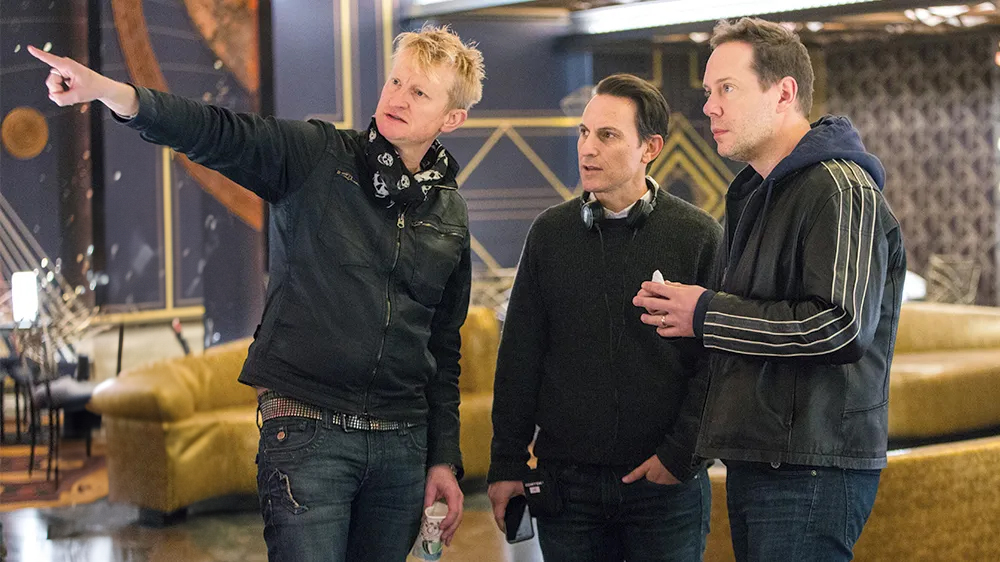
Production Designer Guy Hendrix Dyas, Producer Ori Marmur and writer Jon Spaihts on set during filming.

In Spaihts's original 2007 script, Aurora's surname was Dunn. At one point in the film's development, it was set to star Keanu Reeves and Emily Blunt. Other actors temporarily attached to it included Reese Witherspoon and Rachel McAdams. Brian Kirk was originally set to make his feature directorial debut with Reeves in the lead. On December 5, 2014, it was announced that Sony Pictures Entertainment had won the rights to the film, and in early 2015, Morten Tyldum was chosen to direct. He had always wanted to do a big-scale sci-fi movie, but also stressed the importance of character development over effects.

The final cast was announced between February 2015 and January 2016. Lawrence was paid $20 million against 30% of the profit after the movie broke even, while Pratt received $12 million.

=== Filming ===
Principal photography began on September 15, 2015, at Pinewood Atlanta Studios in Fayette County, Georgia, with most of it involving the two leads only. Rodrigo Prieto was the cinematographer, and Maryann Brandon was the editor. Filming wrapped on February 12, 2016.

=== Music ===
Thomas Newman composed the score for Passengers. Spaihts said that he wrote Passengers while listening to Newman's previous scores. Imagine Dragons also recorded the song "Levitate" for the soundtrack, which was released on November 29, 2016. The Chinese theme song for the film is "Light Years Away", composed by G.E.M.; it became the first Chinese music video to surpass 200 million views in September 2019. The Japanese version uses "Because of You" by Juju as its theme song.

== Marketing ==
At the 2016 CinemaCon, Passengers was featured by Sony Pictures chairman Tom Rothman with Lawrence and Pratt in attendance. A teaser trailer of unfinished footage was shown afterward. The first official images of the film were released on August 12, 2016.

== Release ==
=== Theatrical ===
The film had its world premiere at the Regency Village Theater on December 14, 2016. It was released in the United States by Sony Pictures Entertainment on December 21, 2016.

=== Home media ===
Passengers was released on DVD, Blu-ray, and 4K Ultra HD Blu-ray on March 14, 2017, and made available on digital HD from Amazon Video and iTunes on March 7, 2017. On March 14, 2017, Passengers: Awakening, a virtual-reality experience based on the film launched for Oculus Rift and HTC Vive.

== Box office ==
Passengers grossed $100 million in the United States and Canada and $203 million in other territories for a worldwide total of $303 million, against a net production budget of $110 million. It was the second-highest grossing original live-action Hollywood release of 2016, after La La Land.

Passengers opened alongside Sing and Assassin's Creed, and was initially expected to gross around $50 million from 3,478 theaters over its first six days, although the studio anticipated a more conservative $35 million debut. After making $1.2 million from Tuesday night previews and $4.1 million on its first day, projections for the six-day opening were lowered to $27 million. It went on to gross $15.1 million in its opening weekend (a six-day total of $30 million), finishing third at the box office behind Rogue One and Sing. It became the third-biggest original live-action domestic release of 2016 behind La La Land ($149 million) and Central Intelligence ($126 million).

== Reception ==
On Rotten Tomatoes, Passengers holds an approval rating of 30% based on 287 reviews, with an average rating of 5/10. The website's critical consensus reads: "Passengers proves Chris Pratt and Jennifer Lawrence work well together–and that even their chemistry isn't enough to overcome a fatally flawed story." On Metacritic, the film has a weighted average score of 41 out of 100, based on 48 critics, indicating "mixed or average reviews." Audiences polled by CinemaScore gave the film an average grade of "B" on an A+ to F scale, while PostTrak reported filmgoers gave it a 77% overall positive score.

Mick LaSalle of the San Francisco Chronicle gave the film 3 out of 4 stars, writing, "Despite the confinement and the limited cast, Passengers has moments of intense drama that take the actors to places of extreme feeling." James Dyer of Empire gave the film 4 out of 5 stars, calling it "as surprisingly traditional as it is undeniably effective," and describing it as, "Titanic amongst the stars" and "a touching, heartfelt tale of loss and love for the Gravity generation." Peter Keough of The Boston Globe gave it 2.5 out of 4 stars, writing: "Perhaps as a well-written play for a cast of three, Passengers might have been first class. Instead, it's just another mediocre thrill ride." Peter Bradshaw of The Guardian called the film an "appealing sci-fi romance", but criticized its final act as an "anticlimax," giving it 3 out of 5 stars. Sheri Linden of The Hollywood Reporter said it "concocts a sort of Titanic in outer space, with dollops of 'Sleeping Beauty' and Gravity thrown into the high-concept mix." She praised the striking visual design and elegant costumes, but said that the "heavy-handed mix of life-or-death exigencies and feel-good bromides finally feels like a case of more being less."

Rebecca Hawkes of The Telegraph described the film as not a romance, but "a creepy ode to manipulation", describing the action as a "central act of violence" that is softened and justified. Andrew Pulver of The Guardian called it an "interstellar version of social-media stalking" with "a fantastically creepy start" that, contrary to romantic comedies that managed to "plane down" the nastiness of stalking tactics, presented them in a way where they were "gruesomely inescapable". Alissa Wilkinson of Vox called it "a fantasy of Stockholm syndrome, in which the captured eventually identifies with and even loves the captor" and "a really disturbing wish fulfillment fantasy."

Lawrence was initially proud of the film, but agreed with suggestions that it might have benefited from a different edit, starting with her character waking up. Later, she expressed regret over starring in the film, saying that Adele had advised her against it as "space movies are the new vampire movies" and that she should have listened. Producer Neal H. Moritz said he loved the film, and thought the script was one of the best he had ever read. He pointed out that it was well received at test screenings, but that shortly before its release the media picked up on one review and "it became a mantra." He "thought it was a really unfair thing, because I think it's a beautiful film I couldn't be more proud of."

=== Accolades ===
List of awards and nominations
Award	Date of ceremony	Category	Recipients	Result	Ref.
Academy Awards	February 26, 2017	Best Original Score	Thomas Newman	Nominated	
Academy Awards	February 26, 2017	Best Production Design	Guy Hendrix Dyas and Gene Serdena	Nominated	
Art Directors Guild Awards	February 11, 2017	Excellence in Production Design for a Fantasy Film	Guy Hendrix Dyas	Won	
Golden Trailer Awards	June 6, 2017	Best Action	Sony Pictures Entertainment	Nominated	
Golden Trailer Awards	June 6, 2017	Best Motion Poster	Sony Pictures Entertainment	Nominated	
Saturn Awards	June 28, 2017	Best Science Fiction Film	Passengers	Nominated	
Saturn Awards	June 28, 2017	Best Actor	Chris Pratt	Nominated	
Saturn Awards	June 28, 2017	Best Actress	Jennifer Lawrence	Nominated	
Saturn Awards	June 28, 2017	Best Music	Thomas Newman	Nominated	
Saturn Awards	June 28, 2017	Best Production Design	Guy Hendrix Dyas	Nominated	
