= The Darkest Hour (film) =

2011 film by Chris Gorak

- Theatrical release poster
- Directed by: Chris Gorak
- Screenplay by: Jon Spaihts
- Story by: Leslie Bohem; M.T. Ahern; Jon Spaihts
- Produced by: Tom Jacobson; Timur Bekmambetov
- Starring: Emile Hirsch; Olivia Thirlby; Max Minghella; Rachael Taylor
- Cinematography: Scott Kevan
- Edited by: Priscilla Nedd-Friendly; Fernando Villena
- Music by: Tyler Bates
- Production companies: Regency Enterprises; Bazelevs Company; New Regency; Jacobson Company
- Distributed by: Summit Entertainment (United States); 20th Century Fox (International)
- Release dates: December 22, 2011 (Russia); December 25, 2011 (United States)
- Running time: 89 minutes
- Countries: United States; Russia
- Languages: English; Russian
- Budget: $34.8 million
- Box office: $64.6 million

The Darkest Hour is a 2011 science fiction action film directed by Chris Gorak from a screenplay by Jon Spaihts and produced by Timur Bekmambetov. The film stars Emile Hirsch, Max Minghella, Olivia Thirlby, Rachael Taylor, and Joel Kinnaman as a group of people caught in an alien invasion. The film was released on December 22, 2011 in Russia by 20th Century Fox and on December 25, 2011, in the United States by Summit Entertainment, and grossed $65 million on a $35 million budget.

== Plot ==
Two Americans, Ben and Sean, travel to Moscow to sell a software application. After arriving, they find their business partner, Skyler, has betrayed them by already selling a knockoff. Disappointed, the pair goes to a nightclub, where they meet tourists Natalie and Anne. Suddenly, the electricity cuts off around the world and everyone heads outside. They witness balls of light fall from the sky and fade away. Invisible entities begin hunting and disintegrating people, plunging the entire world into chaos.

Ben, Sean, Natalie, Anne, and Skyler hide in the club's storeroom. After a few days, they emerge to find the city full of scorched cars and ruined buildings, but devoid of people. While they search for supplies in a Militsiya police car, an alien appears as an invisible, shifting spherical object. They hide as it moves closer, causing the car's lights and siren to turn on. Sean realizes that light bulbs and other electronics give the aliens away. The group takes shelter in a shopping mall. Looking for clothes, Sean and Natalie almost run into an alien, which cannot "see" them through a glass wall. Sean theorizes that the aliens can only sense their bodies' electrical charge, but not through glass or other insulators.

The group finds the US embassy gutted and lifeless. A logbook there reveals that the invasion is worldwide. They also discover a radio broadcasting a message in Russian. During their search, Skyler is killed by the aliens. Seeing a light in a nearby apartment tower, the survivors go to investigate. They find a young woman named Vika and a man named Sergei, an electrical engineer. Sergei has turned his apartment into a giant Faraday cage that hides everyone. He has also developed a microwave gun that weakens an alien's force field, rendering them visible and vulnerable. Vika and Sergei translate the radio message, which says that a nuclear submarine is waiting in the Moscow River to take survivors to safety, but will leave soon.

Vika, Natalie, and Anne gather supplies from other apartments. An alien senses them and gives chase. When they get to the apartment, the alien gets inside with them. Sergei shoots the alien with his gun, to no avail. The alien kills him while the others escape. Anne is also killed in the ensuing chase. To fight back, Natalie sets the apartment on fire and meets up with Vika.

The group later meets with Russian policemen who manage to wound an alien with conventional weapons. Sean collects a piece of the alien's body while the small police band agrees to help the group get to the submarine. As they move through the subway, an alien discovers them and kills Ben.

The survivors make it to a powerless patrol boat on the river and drift downstream to the waiting submarine. The boat nears the submarine, but runs aground. As they attempt to push free, an alien light beam causes the boat to capsize. Sean and the policemen swim towards the submarine, but upon reaching it, they discover Natalie is missing. Sean is determined to get her, possibly missing his chance to escape. The policemen agree to help him. The submarine crew, after expressing their doubts about the rescue, assist by building another microwave gun with stronger batteries.

Sean finds Natalie on a bus while the policemen and Vika start destroying aliens with the microwave guns. During the battle, Sean discovers the creatures' weakness when he throws a piece of the wounded alien he collected to another one, killing it. The two stop the bus and narrowly avoid a collision.

After returning to the submarine, the police team decides to stay and fight for the city. Sean, Natalie, and Vika plan to spread what they learned about the aliens to the rest of humanity. They learn that multiple resistance groups are fighting back all over the world.

== Cast ==
- Emile Hirsch as Sean, Natalie's love interest
- Olivia Thirlby as Natalie, Sean's love interest
- Max Minghella as Ben, Sean's best friend
- Rachael Taylor as Anne, Natalie's best friend
- Joel Kinnaman as Skyler, the gunner and former business partner of Sean and Ben
- Dato Bakhtadze as Sergei
- Gosha Kutsenko as Matvei
- Veronika Vernadskaya as Vika
- Nikolay Efremov as Sasha
- Pyotr Fyodorov as Anton Batkin
- Georgiy Gromov as Boris
- Artur Smolyaninov as Yuri
- Anna Rudakova as Tess

== Production ==
The Darkest Hour was directed by Chris Gorak and produced by Timur Bekmambetov. While most films about alien invasions are centered in the United States or have an international scale, Bekmambetov's involvement ensured the premise to be an alien invasion from Russia's perspective.

With a production budget of $34.8 million, filming with 3D cameras began in Moscow on July 18, 2010. Production used resources from the Russian-based company Bazelevs, owned by Bekmambetov.

Filming was temporarily suspended three weeks later due to the 2010 Russian wildfires affecting the city and its vicinity with their smog. By September 2010, filming had resumed. In April 2011 the release date was changed to December 25 due to filming conflicts in Russia.

== Release ==
The Darkest Hour was released in the United States on December 25, 2011. The DVD release date was April 10, 2012, by Summit Entertainment. In the United Kingdom, it was released theatrically on January 13, 2012, and on DVD on May 21, 2012.

== Reception ==
On the review aggregator website Rotten Tomatoes, 12% of 60 critics' reviews are positive, with an average rating of 3.2/10. The website's consensus reads: "Devoid of believable characters or convincing visual effects, this may be The Darkest Hour for the careers of all involved." Metacritic, which uses a weighted average, assigned the film a score of 18 out of 100, based on 10 critics, indicating "overwhelming dislike". Audiences polled by CinemaScore gave the film an average grade of "C+" on an A+ to F scale.

The Hollywood Reporter criticized the film for having a "flatlining screenplay and the absence of even a single compelling character", and The New York Times wrote that it has "a depressing failure of imagination". Writing for Slant Magazine, Budd Wilkins called it "a dimwitted 3D sci-fi travesty" and wrote, "Indifferently structured, Jon Spaihts's lame-brained script knows no narrative contrivance it doesn't love and, what's worse, blows its expositional load in the first 10 minutes, bringing together a quintet of cardboard cutout leads." Joe Leydon of Variety called it a "modestly inventive and involving variation on a standard-issue sci-fi doomsday scenario".
