= Walking the Wire (song) =

Promotional single by Imagine Dragons

from the album Evolve
- Released: June 15, 2017
- Genre: Pop
- Length: 3:53
- Label: Kidinakorner; Interscope
- Songwriters: Dan Reynolds; Wayne Sermon; Ben McKee; Daniel Platzman; Robin Fredriksson; Mattias Larsson; Justin Tranter
- Producer: Mattman & Robin

Imagine Dragons promotional singles chronology
"I'm So Sorry" (2015)	"Walking the Wire" (2017)	"Love of Mine" (2022)

Licensed audio
- "Walking the Wire" (Official Audio) on YouTube

"Walking the Wire" is a song by American pop rock band Imagine Dragons. The song was written by Dan Reynolds, Wayne Sermon, Ben McKee, Daniel Platzman, Robin Fredriksson, Mattias Larsson, Justin Tranter with production handled by Mattman & Robin. It was released to digital retailers on June 15, 2017, as the third promotional single released off the band’s third studio album, Evolve (2017).

== Background ==
On June 15, "Walking the Wire" was made available for download with any purchase from the band's online shop. The song was accidentally released onto YouTube and Vevo a day earlier than planned, only to be taken down within a few hours.

== Critical reception ==
Bobby Olivier of Billboard magazine wrote that the song "may be the band's most overtly pleasing pop anthem to date". Lauren Murphy of The Irish Times wrote: "Walking the Wire and Whatever It Takes are both arms-aloft anthems, but the more enjoyable tracks follow an 1980s pop template, like the Hall & Oates-style Make It Up to You and Start Over." Rob Harvilla of The Ringer wrote: "'Walking the Wire,' with a romantic and inspirational anthem that at least sands off the rough edges of all that bellowing/screeching, is the closest these guys have come to their own version of Katy Perry's 'Roar,' or OneRepublic's 'Counting Stars,' or Rachel Platten's 'Fight Song.'" Allen Pham of Daily Trojan wrote: "'Walking the Wire' is one of the better songs on Evolve's tracklist. Though Imagine Dragons uses less acoustics and more country music here, the song is evidence of the group's potential to achieve 2017-style music stardom while not completely straying from their roots."

== Charts ==
=== Weekly charts ===
Weekly chart performance for "Walking the Wire"
Chart (2017)	Peak position
Czech Republic Singles Digital (ČNS IFPI)	36
France (SNEP)	125
Germany (GfK)	97
Italy (Musica e Dischi)	46
New Zealand Heatseekers (RMNZ)	8
Portugal (AFP)	84
Slovakia Airplay (ČNS IFPI)	91
Slovakia Singles Digital (ČNS IFPI)	38
Switzerland (Schweizer Hitparade)	80
US Bubbling Under Hot 100 (Billboard)	5
US Hot Rock & Alternative Songs (Billboard)	6

=== Year-end charts ===
Year-end chart performance for "Walking the Wire"
Chart (2017)	Position
US Hot Rock Songs (Billboard)	54

== Certifications ==
Certifications for "Walking the Wire"
Region	Certification	Certified units/sales
Brazil (Pro-Música Brasil)	Platinum	60,000^{‡}
Italy (FIMI)	Gold	25,000^{‡}
New Zealand (RMNZ)	Gold	15,000^{‡}
Portugal (AFP)	Gold	5,000^{‡}
Spain (Promusicae)	Gold	30,000^{‡}
United Kingdom (BPI)	Silver	200,000^{‡}
United States (RIAA)	Gold	500,000^{‡}
^{‡} Sales+streaming figures based on certification alone.
