= Fil Bo Riva =

Italian musician

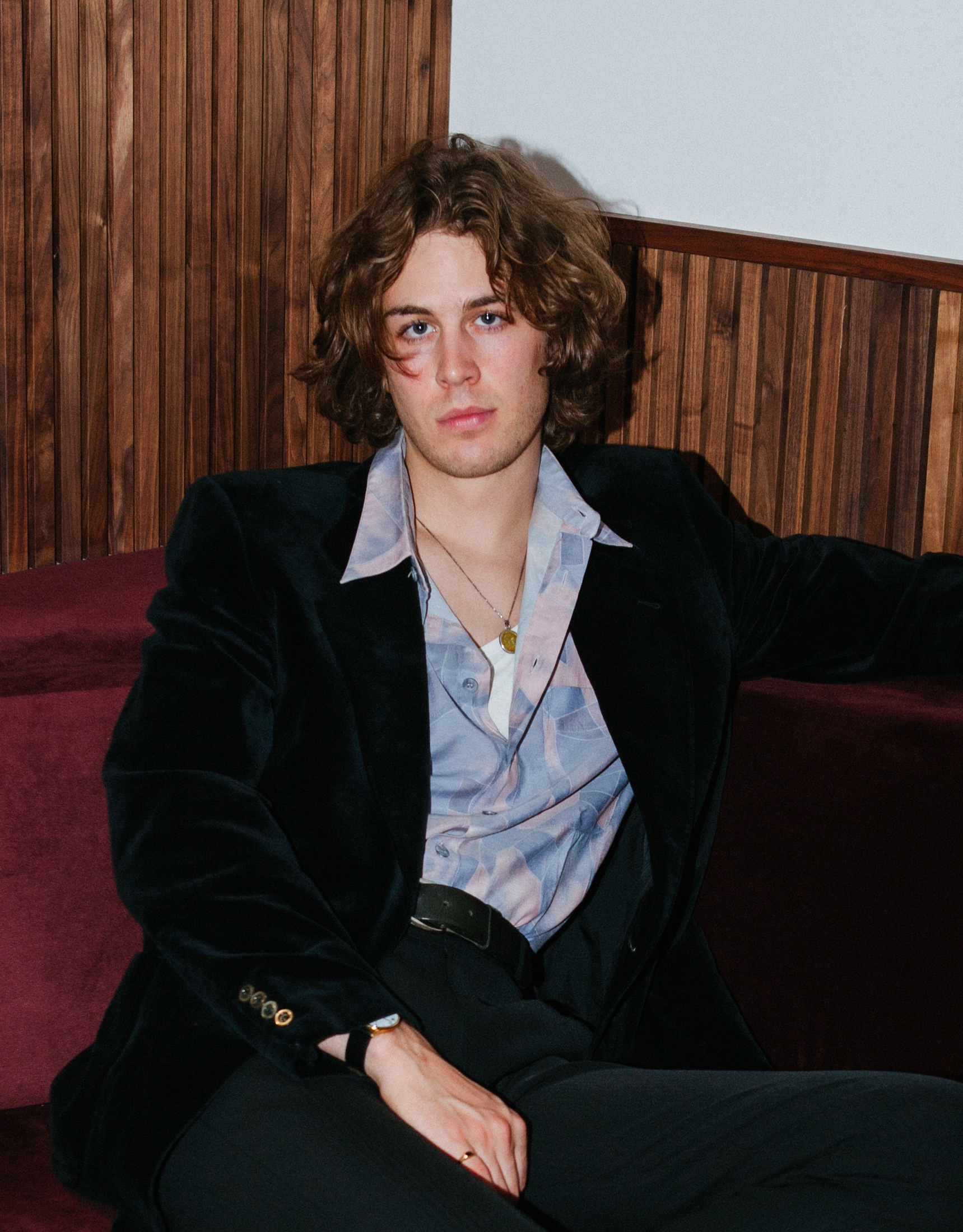

Background information
- Born: Filippo Bonamici; 1992 or 1993; Rome, Italy
- Genres: Alternative rock; indie rock; indie pop
- Occupations: Singer; songwriter; musician; multi-instrumentalist; record producer
- Years active: 2015–present
- Labels: PIAS Recordings; Humming Records
- Website: filboriva.com

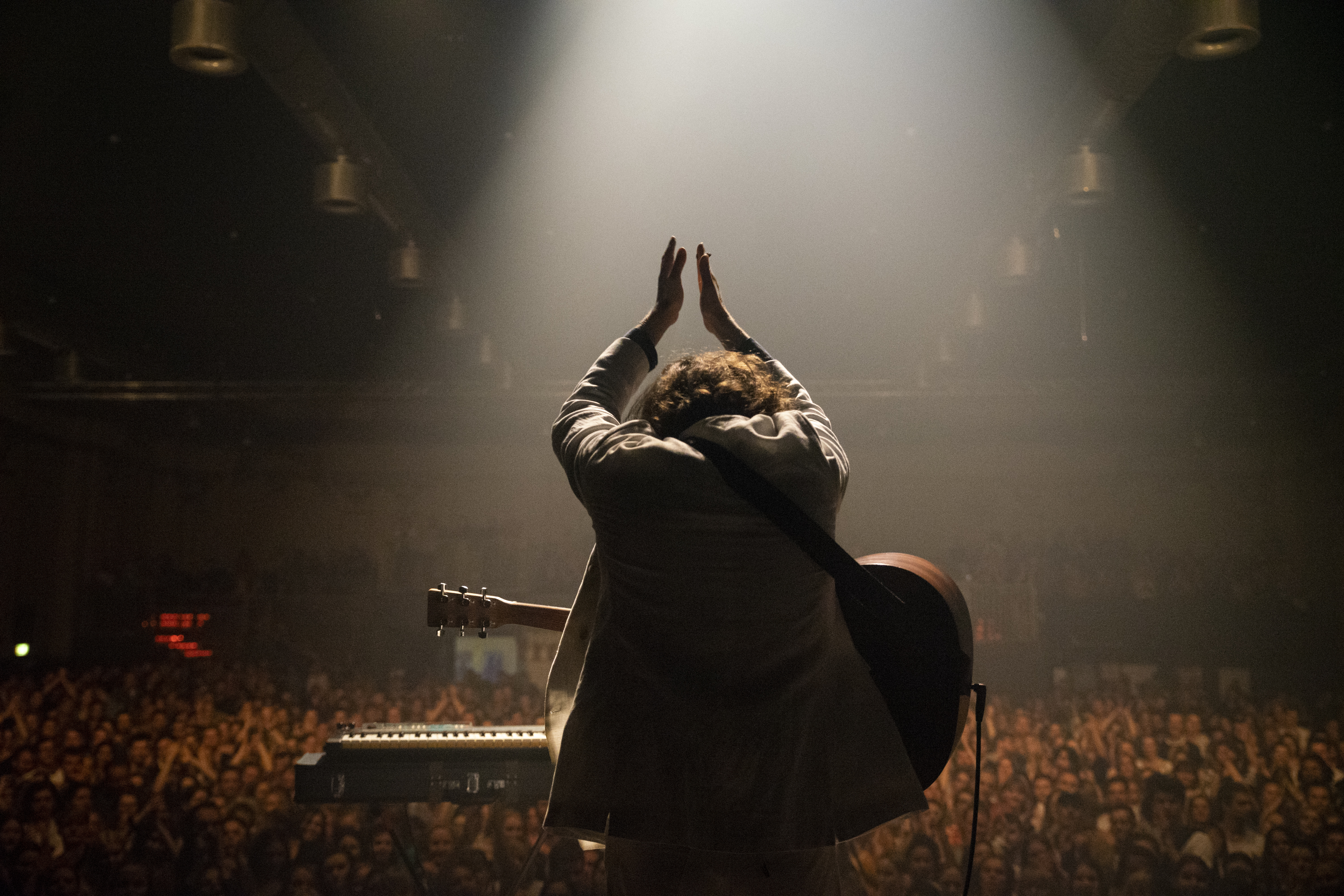
Fil Bo Riva on stage in Berlin during the Beautiful Sadness Tour 2019

Filippo Bonamici, known professionally as Fil Bo Riva, is an Italian singer, songwriter, musician and producer. His style blends elements from indie rock, indie pop, folk and soul and is led by the timbre of his distinct voice.

== Life ==
Filippo Bonamici was born in Rome to an Italian father and a German mother. Around the age of 10 he started singing and playing guitar - he soon started his first band with his brother and two neighbors. Aged 14, he was sent to Cistercian College Roscrea, a Catholic boarding school in Ireland, where his musical education formed and developed gradually. After school, he lived in Madrid and Munich, working in different jobs, before returning to Rome. In 2012, Bonamici moved to Berlin and started studying Design at the renowned Berlin University of the Arts (UdK). After several years of intense study and musical abstinence, he discovered fresh inspiration and positive distractions that shaped his songwriting. He dropped out of University in 2015 to pursue a career in music. Such new motivation led to the formation of Fil Bo Riva in 2015 and a brief period of busking. During this time, he met guitarist Felix A. Remm (first member of the live band) and producer Robert Stephenson. Together they started recording songs that would become Fil Bo Rivas acclaimed first EP, If You’re Right, It’s Alright.

In 2016, the Berlin based project artist to garner significant international attention after the release of debut single "Like Eye Did", and after multiple support slots – most notably with Milky Chance, Imagine Dragons and Joan As Police Woman - the next step had to be taken. 2017 and 2018 proved to be watershed years – his first headline shows, three sold out tours, and playing at European festivals like Montreux Jazz Festival, Lollapalooza, Eurosonic and The Great Escape Festival brought him some serious acclaim and a raft of new fans. During this time Bonamici kept working on his debut album and teasing fans with new music, readying what they knew would be his defining musical statement.

The debut album Beautiful Sadness was released in March 2019 on Humming Records with the third single L'impossibile reaching the top 30 in Italian radio.

In the same year he was also nominated for the Music Moves Europe Talent Award.

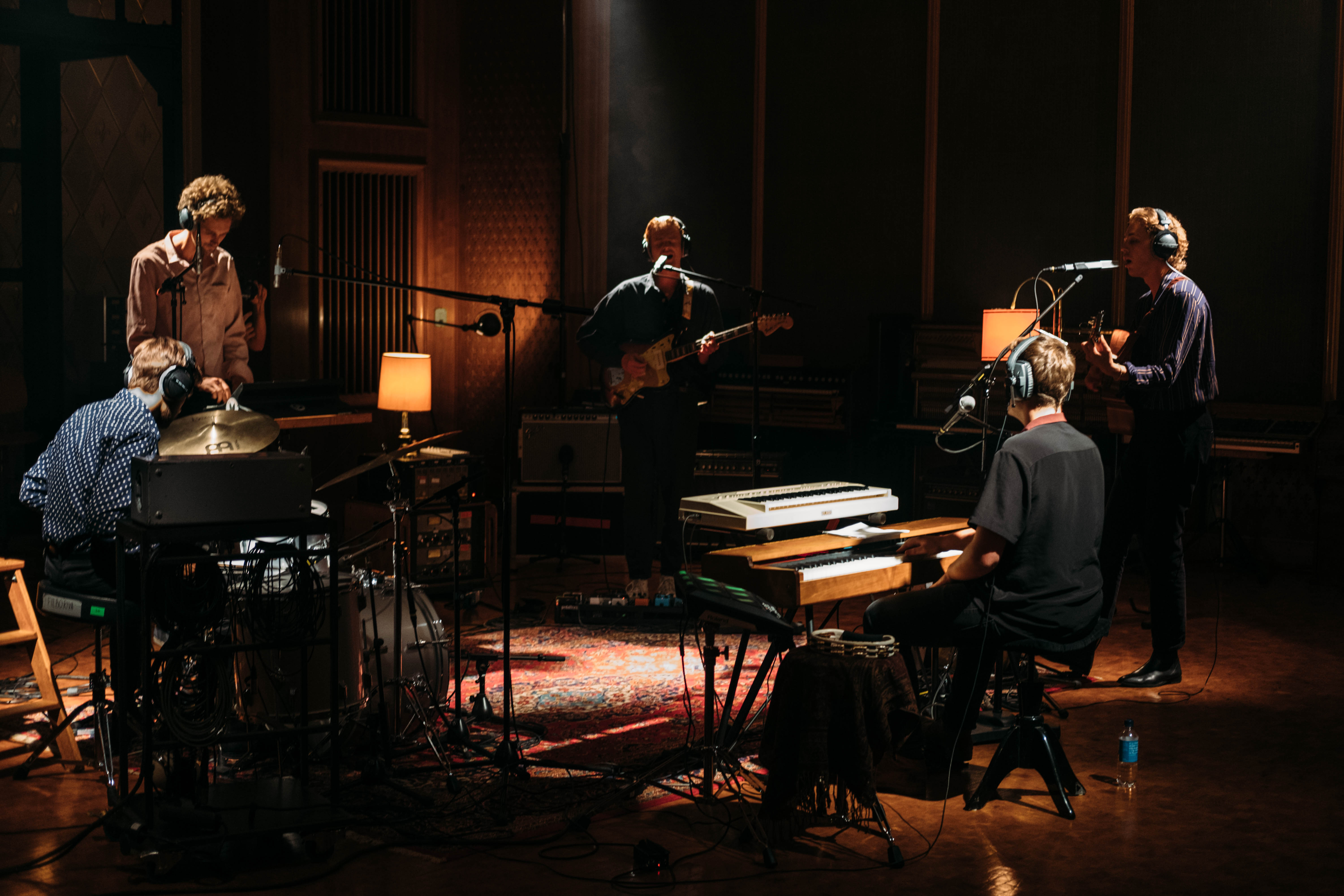
Fil Bo Riva and his band during a live session in 2018

== Discography ==
EP

- 2016: If You're Right, It's Alright (PIAS Recordings)

Album

- 2019: Beautiful Sadness (Humming Records)
- 2024: Modern Melancholia

Singles

- 2016: Like Eye Did
- 2016: Franzis
- 2017: The Falling (Live Version)
- 2017: Head Sonata
- 2018: Go Rilla
- 2018: L'over
- 2019: L'impossibile
- 2019: Different But One
- 2019: A Happy Song
- 2019: Head Sonata (Acoustic Version)
- 2020: Cold Mine
- 2021: Solo
- 2022: postcard from Berlin
- 2022: Young & Free
- 2022: Running in Circles
- 2023: Modern Melancholia
- 2024: I Like You

Features

- 2022: Grapejuice-Oscar Anton (Feat. Fil Bo Riva)
