= Next to Me (Imagine Dragons song) =

Imagine Dragons song

Single by Imagine Dragons

from the album Evolve
- Released: February 21, 2018
- Recorded: December 2017
- Length: 3:50
- Label: Kidinakorner; Interscope
- Songwriters: Wayne Sermon; Dan Reynolds; Alexander Grant; Ben McKee; Daniel Platzman
- Producer: Alex da Kid

Imagine Dragons singles chronology
"Whatever It Takes" (2017)	"Next to Me" (2018)	"Born to Be Yours" (2018)

Music video
- "Next to Me" on YouTube

"Next to Me" is a song recorded by American pop rock band Imagine Dragons. Written by all four members of the band and producer Alex da Kid, it was released through Kidinakorner and Interscope Records on February 21, 2018, as the fourth single from the band's third studio album Evolve (2017), appearing as the first track on a re-issue of the album.

== Background and release ==
The band first teased the song on February 14, 2018, with a tweet that contains the cover artwork, which features two people in a canyon. They captioned the picture: "2/21 the evolution begins." The single premiered on Zane Lowe's Beats 1 radio show as the day's "World Record", and was released alongside the announcement of extended summer tour dates.

"Next to Me" was referred to as the band's first love song. Dan Reynolds, lead singer of the song, admitted that it was an unexpected theme change in the interview with Lowe, saying: "Yeah I don't typically write love songs. I started writing when I was about 13 years old and it was a source of an escape from school from depression from feeling lost and it was never a romance. So for me this is some of the first times that I've really explored diving into my mind and musicality and sonicality of romance." He regarded it as "something everybody can relate to", which is the "feeling like you are going to fail sometimes in a relationship and the true value of a relationship is what happens then".

== Music video ==
An accompanying short film for the song was released on March 13, 2018. The video stars the lead singer, Dan Reynolds, and his wife, Aja Volkman. In the video, Aja leaves Dan due to his problems, leading to him attempting to sell his wedding ring. The clerk (played by Wayne Sermon) tells him that the ring is not worth much, and in his anger, Dan kills the clerk. The rest of the video features a series of flashbacks while Dan is on death row, and his eventual execution.

== Critical reception ==
Ryan Reed of Rolling Stone opined that the band manages to "blend the experimental and accessible" on the track, writing that it "builds to an arena-worthy chorus with massive, choral-style backing vocals and electronic effects". Scott T. Sterling of CBS Radio deemed the song "a big and powerful ballad that highlights Reynolds soaring and impassioned vocals". Mike Wass of Idolator stated that the song features a "sleepy tempo".

== Credits and personnel ==
Credits adapted from Tidal.

Imagine Dragons

- Wayne Sermon – guitars, composition
- Dan Reynolds – lead vocals, composition
- Ben McKee – bass guitar, composition
- Daniel Platzman – drums, composition

Additional musicians

- Aja Volkman – additional vocals
- Alex da Kid – composition, production

Technical personnel

- Manny Marroquin – mixing

== Charts ==
=== Weekly charts ===
Chart (2018)	Peak position
Australia (ARIA)	96
Belgium (Ultratip Bubbling Under Flanders)	1
Canada Hot 100 (Billboard)	68
Czech Republic Airplay (ČNS IFPI)	3
Czech Republic Singles Digital (ČNS IFPI)	17
France (SNEP)	22
Italy (FIMI)	21
Netherlands (Dutch Tipparade 40)	1
Netherlands (Single Tip)	3
New Zealand Heatseekers (RMNZ)	3
Portugal (AFP)	90
Scotland Singles (OCC)	67
Slovakia Airplay (ČNS IFPI)	26
Slovakia Singles Digital (ČNS IFPI)	36
Sweden (Sverigetopplistan)	72
Switzerland (Schweizer Hitparade)	51
UK Singles (OCC)	98
US Bubbling Under Hot 100 (Billboard)	10
US Hot Rock & Alternative Songs (Billboard)	7
Venezuela (National-Report)	91

=== Year-end charts ===
Chart (2018)	Position
Italy (FIMI)	57
Portugal Full Track Downloads (AFP)	44
US Hot Rock Songs (Billboard)	40

== Certifications ==
Region	Certification	Certified units/sales
Brazil (Pro-Música Brasil)	Platinum	40,000^{‡}
France (SNEP)	Platinum	200,000^{‡}
Italy (FIMI)	Platinum	50,000^{‡}
New Zealand (RMNZ)	Gold	15,000^{‡}
Poland (ZPAV)	Gold	25,000^{‡}
Portugal (AFP)	Platinum	10,000^{‡}
Spain (Promusicae)	Gold	30,000^{‡}
United Kingdom (BPI)	Silver	200,000^{‡}
United States (RIAA)	Gold	500,000^{‡}
^{‡} Sales+streaming figures based on certification alone.
