= Thunder (Imagine Dragons song) =

2017 single by Imagine Dragons

Single by Imagine Dragons

from the album Evolve
- Released: April 27, 2017
- Genre: Electropop; synth-pop; arena rock; pop rock
- Length: 3:07
- Label: Interscope; Kidinakorner
- Songwriters: Dan Reynolds; Wayne Sermon; Ben McKee; Daniel Platzman; Alexander Grant; Jayson DeZuzio; Frederick Hansen
- Producers: Alex Da Kid; Jayson DeZuzio

Imagine Dragons singles chronology
"Believer" (2017)	"Thunder" (2017)	"Whatever It Takes" (2017)

Music video
- "Thunder" on YouTube

"Thunder" is a song by American rock band Imagine Dragons. It was released by Interscope Records and Kidinakorner on April 27, 2017, as the second single from their third studio album, Evolve (2017). Written by band members Dan Reynolds, Wayne Sermon, Ben McKee, Daniel Platzman, and its producers Alex Da Kid and Jayson DeZuzio, "Thunder" peaked at number four, tying with "Believer" on the US Billboard Hot 100. The song became the band's fourth single in that country to reach the top ten after "Radioactive", "Demons" and "Believer". It also reached the top 10 in Australia, Austria, Belgium, Canada, Germany, Italy, New Zealand, Poland, Slovakia, Slovenia, Sweden and the Netherlands. The song was nominated for a Grammy Award for Best Pop Duo/Group Performance.

== Music video ==
The official music video for the song was released on Imagine Dragons' YouTube channel on May 2, 2017. The video was shot in Dubai, filmed in black and white. It features the band's lead vocalist, Dan Reynolds, singing and dancing among extraterrestrials, portrayed by dancers Haroon Al Abdali, Mamadou Bathily, and Gianna Gi, around Downtown Dubai and the Burj Khalifa. It was directed by Joseph Kahn.

As of October 2026, the video has over 2.4 billion views on YouTube, making it the group's second most viewed video, only behind "Believer". It also has over 13 million likes.

== Live performances ==
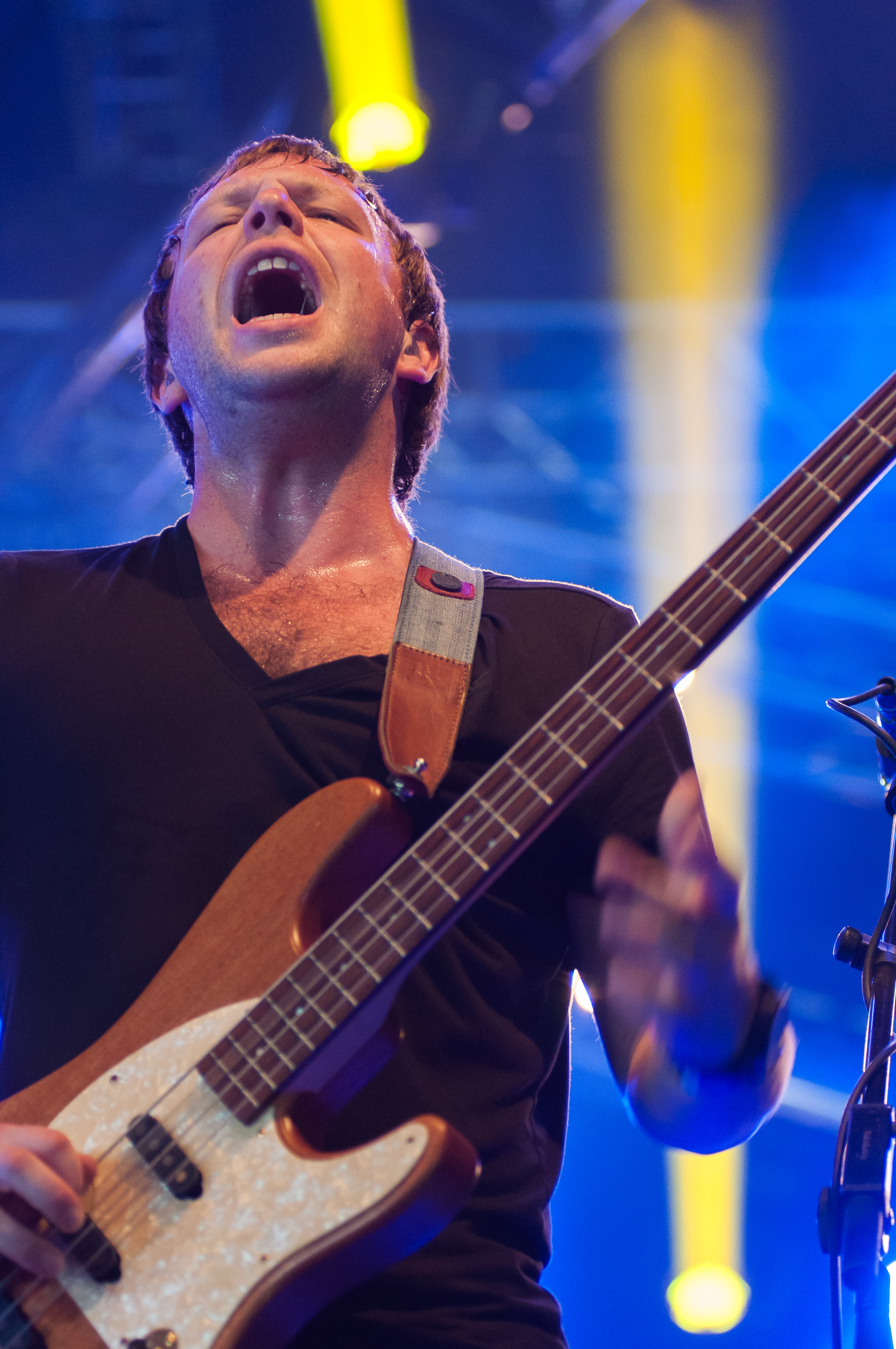
Ben McKee in 2013

Imagine Dragons performed the song at the 2017 American Music Awards, in a medley with singer Khalid's "Young Dumb & Broke", with Khalid joining them for the performance. A little over a month later, on December 20, a studio version of the mash-up was released.

== Chart performance ==
"Thunder" peaked at number four on the US Billboard Hot 100. The single has also reached number one in Belarus, the Czech Republic and the top ten in Australia, Austria, Belgium, Canada, Germany, Hungary, Italy, Netherlands, New Zealand, Paraguay, Poland, Russia, Slovakia, Sweden, and Switzerland. It topped the Billboard Hot Rock Songs chart for 21 weeks, Alternative Songs (three weeks), Adult Top 40 (seven weeks), and the Mainstream Top 40 (for one week) charts.

It became the ninth best-selling song of 2017 in the United States, with 1,189,000 copies sold in the year.

== Critical reception ==
Critics from Billboard magazine placed the song at number 84 on its list of best songs of 2017, stating "'Thunder' is relatively stripped down, and between its soldierly cadence and a bouncy, helium-inflated, one-word hook, it makes for a curious pop gem". In a review of the band's live performance at London's O2 Arena, The Guardian wrote of the song: "...the irresistible, hiccupping electro-pop of Thunder, a tune that could sit equally happily in a set by Pink or Rihanna".

== Track listing ==
Digital download
No.	Title	Length
1.	"Thunder"	3:07

Digital download – official remix
No.	Title	Length
1.	"Thunder" (official remix) (with K.Flay)	3:15

CD single
No.	Title	Length
1.	"Thunder"	3:08
2.	"Believer"	3:22

Digital download – medley
No.	Title	Length
1.	"Thunder / Young Dumb & Broke" (medley) (with Khalid)	4:11

== Charts ==
=== Weekly charts ===
Chart (2017–2023)	Peak position
Australia (ARIA)	2
Austria (Ö3 Austria Top 40)	2
Belarus Airplay (Eurofest)	1
Belgium (Ultratop 50 Flanders)	4
Belgium (Ultratop 50 Wallonia)	6
Canada Hot 100 (Billboard)	4
CIS Airplay (TopHit)	3
Czech Republic Airplay (ČNS IFPI)	5
Czech Republic Singles Digital (ČNS IFPI)	1
El Salvador Airplay (Monitor Latino)	17
Finland (Suomen virallinen lista)	17
France (SNEP)	20
Germany (GfK)	2
Global 200 (Billboard)	150
Hungary (Rádiós Top 40)	24
Hungary (Single Top 40)	4
Hungary (Stream Top 40)	2
Ireland (IRMA)	18
Italy (FIMI)	5
Latvia Streaming (LaIPA)	24
Lebanon (Lebanese Top 20)	12
Malaysia (RIM)	15
Mexico Airplay (Billboard)	12
Netherlands (Dutch Top 40)	8
Netherlands (Single Top 100)	21
New Zealand (Recorded Music NZ)	3
Norway (VG-lista)	12
Paraguay Airplay (Monitor Latino)	8
Philippines (Philippine Hot 100)	24
Poland Airplay (ZPAV)	2
Portugal (AFP)	12
Russia Airplay (TopHit)	2
Scottish Singles Sales (Official Charts)	31
Slovakia Airplay (ČNS IFPI)	3
Slovakia Singles Digital (ČNS IFPI)	2
Slovenia Airplay (SloTop50)	5
Spain (Promusicae)	36
Sweden (Sverigetopplistan)	10
Switzerland (Schweizer Hitparade)	2
UK Singles (Official Charts)	20
US Billboard Hot 100	4
US Adult Contemporary (Billboard)	7
US Adult Pop Airplay (Billboard)	1
US Pop Airplay (Billboard)	1
US Hot Rock & Alternative Songs (Billboard)	1
US Rock & Alternative Airplay (Billboard)	2

==== Medley version ====
Chart (2018)	Peak position
US Billboard Hot 100	69
US Hot Rock & Alternative Songs (Billboard)	4

=== Year-end charts ===
Chart (2017)	Position
Australia (ARIA)	6
Austria (Ö3 Austria Top 40)	3
Belgium (Ultratop Flanders)	18
Belgium (Ultratop Wallonia)	34
Brazil Streaming (Pro-Música Brasil)	80
Canada (Canadian Hot 100)	43
France (SNEP)	61
Germany (Official German Charts)	4
Hungary (Single Top 40)	23
Hungary (Stream Top 40)	4
Italy (FIMI)	12
Latvia Airplay (LaIPA)	19
Netherlands (Dutch Top 40)	27
Netherlands (Single Top 100)	42
New Zealand (Recorded Music NZ)	6
Poland Airplay (ZPAV)	67
Portugal (AFP)	15
Slovenia Airplay (SloTop50)	41
Spain (Promusicae)	88
Sweden (Sverigetopplistan)	19
Switzerland (Schweizer Hitparade)	11
UK Singles (OCC)	100
US Billboard Hot 100	51
US Adult Top 40 (Billboard)	47
US Hot Rock Songs (Billboard)	4
US Rock Airplay (Billboard)	11
Chart (2018)	Position
Australia (ARIA)	50
Canada (Canadian Hot 100)	18
Hungary (Single Top 40)	32
Portugal (AFP)	38
Sweden (Sverigetopplistan)	99
Switzerland (Schweizer Hitparade)	77
US Billboard Hot 100	22
US Radio Songs (Billboard)	14
US Adult Contemporary (Billboard)	10
US Adult Top 40 (Billboard)	7
US Hot Rock Songs (Billboard)	1
US Mainstream Top 40 (Billboard)	34
US Rock Airplay (Billboard)	21
Chart (2019)	Position
Portugal (AFP)	156
Chart (2022)	Position
Global 200 (Billboard)	196
Hungary (Rádiós Top 40)	47
Chart (2023)	Position
Belarus Airplay (TopHit)	157
Global 200 (Billboard)	173
Hungary (Rádiós Top 40)	46
Chart (2024)	Position
Belarus Airplay (TopHit)	169

==== Medley version ====
Chart (2018)	Position
US Hot Rock Songs (Billboard)	43

=== Decade-end charts ===
Chart (2010–2019)	Position
Australia (ARIA)	50
US Hot Rock Songs (Billboard)	2

== Certifications ==
Region	Certification	Certified units/sales
Australia (ARIA)	17× Platinum	1,190,000^{‡}
Austria (IFPI Austria)	3× Platinum	90,000^{‡}
Belgium (BRMA)	2× Platinum	40,000^{‡}
Brazil (Pro-Música Brasil)	6× Diamond	1,500,000^{‡}
Brazil (Pro-Música Brasil) Medley Version	Gold	20,000^{‡}
Canada (Music Canada)	6× Platinum	480,000^{‡}
Denmark (IFPI Danmark)	Platinum	90,000^{‡}
France (SNEP)	Diamond	233,333^{‡}
Germany (BVMI)	3× Platinum	1,200,000^{‡}
Italy (FIMI)	5× Platinum	250,000^{‡}
New Zealand (RMNZ)	9× Platinum	270,000^{‡}
Norway (IFPI Norway)	2× Platinum	120,000^{‡}
Poland (ZPAV)	Diamond	100,000^{‡}
Portugal (AFP)	2× Platinum	20,000^{‡}
South Korea	—	2,500,000
Spain (Promusicae)	2× Platinum	120,000^{‡}
United Kingdom (BPI)	4× Platinum	2,400,000^{‡}
United States (RIAA)	13× Platinum	13,000,000^{‡}
Streaming
Sweden (GLF)	5× Platinum	40,000,000^{†}
^{‡} Sales+streaming figures based on certification alone.^{†} Streaming-only figures based on certification alone.

== Release history ==
Region	Date	Format	Label	Ref.
United States	April 27, 2017	Digital download	Kidinakorner; Interscope	
Italy	May 26, 2017	Contemporary hit radio	Universal	
United States	September 8, 2017	Digital download – official remix	Kidinakorner; Interscope	
United States	September 11, 2017	Hot adult contemporary radio	Kidinakorner; Interscope	
United States	September 19, 2017	Contemporary hit radio	Kidinakorner; Interscope	
United States	December 20, 2017	Digital download – medley	Kidinakorner; Interscope	

== See also ==
- List of best-selling singles in Australia
