= Chris Gorak =

American film director

- Born: United States
- Occupations: Film director, screenwriter, art director, production designer

Chris Gorak is an American film director who started as an art director and production designer. He directed the 2006 film Right at Your Door and the 2011 film The Darkest Hour. Gorak began working in the film industry in the 1990s as an art director. In the 2000s, he worked on several films as a production designer before becoming a film director.

== Background ==
Gorak attended Tulane University where he earned an architecture degree. He changed his career to film and worked as an art director for directors like David Fincher, the Coen brothers, and Terry Gilliam. When Gorak worked as production designer on the 2004 film The Clearing, he expressed afterward to its producers interest in film direction. They challenged him to provide something viable, and he wrote a script for an intended short film titled Right at Your Door. He eventually directed the 2006 feature thriller film Right at Your Door, which he said was reflective of authorities being impotent in a world after the September 11 attacks. He had initially worried about his film being too similar to 28 Days Later but found inspiration in filming on a low budget. After Right at Your Door, he planned to write and direct a cop drama titled SIS. The film was not realized, and Gorak instead directed the alien invasion film The Darkest Hour, released in 2011. In October 2013, Paramount Pictures bought Gorak's science fiction spec script Attach and began to develop a film, which Gorak is attached to direct. By February 2017, Attach was no longer under Paramount, and actor Alex Russell was cast to star in the film.

Gorak is a member of the Art Directors Guild.

== Filmography ==
Art director

- Tombstone (1993)
- The Grass Harp (1995)
- Rosewood (1997)
- Music from Another Room (1998)
- Fear and Loathing in Las Vegas (1998)
- Fight Club (1999)
- The Man Who Wasn't There (2001)
- Minority Report (2002) (supervising art director)

Production designer

- The Clearing (2004)
- Blade: Trinity (2004)
- Lords of Dogtown (2005)

Film director

- Right at Your Door (2006) (also writer)
- The Darkest Hour (2011)
