= Believer (Imagine Dragons song) =

2017 single by Imagine Dragons

Single by Imagine Dragons

from the album Evolve
- Released: February 1, 2017
- Recorded: 2016
- Genre: Arena rock; pop rock
- Length: 3:24
- Label: Kidinakorner; Interscope
- Songwriters: Dan Reynolds; Wayne Sermon; Ben McKee; Daniel Platzman; Alex da Kid; Robin Fredriksson; Mattias Larsson; Justin Tranter
- Producers: Mattman & Robin

Imagine Dragons singles chronology
"Levitate" (2016)	"Believer" (2017)	"Thunder" (2017)

Music video
- "Believer" on YouTube

"Believer" is a song by American pop rock band Imagine Dragons. The song was released on February 1, 2017, through Kidinakorner and Interscope Records as the lead single from the band's third studio album, Evolve (2017). It was written by the band members, Justin Tranter, Alex da Kid, and its producers Mattman & Robin. The music video features a boxing match between lead singer Dan Reynolds and Dolph Lundgren, marking the first music video that Lundgren appeared in.

"Believer" peaked at number four on the US Billboard Hot 100, becoming the band's third top ten single. It topped various charts, including the Billboard Hot Rock & Alternative Songs chart, which it topped for 29 weeks. Throughout 2017, "Believer" was synchronized various times and was widely used in advertisements, notably for the Nintendo Switch Super Bowl LI advertisement, and several film and television trailers. "Believer" has received over three billion views on YouTube and over two billion streams on Spotify. It was the fifth best-selling song of 2017 in the United States and is one of the best-selling singles of all time.

== Background ==
In March 2017, Dan Reynolds told People that the song was inspired by his experiences with ankylosing spondylitis that he developed, elaborating by saying:

The meaning of the song is really reflecting on specific things in my life that were painful, whether it was anxiety and dealing with crowds, feeling overwhelmed by that or the success of the band, disease, going through depression—anything that was a source of pain in my life. And just rising above that, finding a place of perspective where I could be appreciative of the pain in my life and make it my greatest strength.

"Believer" was written by Imagine Dragons members Dan Reynolds, Wayne Sermon, Ben McKee, and Daniel Platzman, along with Stephen Robertson, Alex da Kid, and its producers Robin Fredriksson and Mattias Larsson, around the time of the 2016 U.S. presidential election. The song marked the band's first time working with Mattman & Robin and Tranter, of whom Reynolds said helped the band get back on track. He called "Believer" "one of those songs that was waiting to be written", with the song coming quickly while they were in a room with Tranter.

It was released on February 1, 2017, under Kidinakorner and Interscope Records, as the lead single to the band's third studio album, Evolve (2017).

== Composition ==
"Believer" is an arena rock and pop rock song with "big thundering pop production" and a "catchy sing-along chorus". According to the sheet music published at Musicnotes.com by Imagine Dragons Publishing, "Believer" has a tempo of 125 beats per minute. Written in the time signature of 12/8, the song is in the key of B♭ minor and follows a chord progression of B♭m-G♭-F (i-♭VI-V). Reynolds' vocal range spans from A♭_{3} to D♭_{5} during the song.

The lyrics to "Believer" are about pain and involve Reynolds sharing his innermost thoughts, while also discussing depression and anxiety, with lines such as "First thing's first, I'mma say all the words inside my head" and "I was choking in the crowd". They were greatly discussed when the song was released; some people believed they were about a childhood father-son struggle despite revolving around Reynolds' struggle with ankylosing spondylitis. In the chorus, Reynolds belts "Pain! You made me a, you made me a believer, believer".

== Critical reception ==
"Believer" initially divided music critics. In a review for Evolve, Matthew Paterson of The Carolinian called it "quintessential Imagine Dragons in the absolute best way possible". Allan Raible of ABC News considered it a "focus track" from Evolve, saying it is "predictable but it has some dark edges that keep it interesting". Glenn Gamboa of Newsday was also positive of "Believer", saying it "shows just how flexible singer Dan Reynolds' vocals can be".

On the other hand, David Smyth of The Standard called "Believer" "shouty" and an example of when the band is "least appealing" on the "aggressive" songs from Evolve. Rob Harvilla of The Ringer said it has a "blaring, all-caps falsetto chorus".

Later reception has been more positive. Billboard ranked "Believer" the band's fifth-best song in 2018, with Bobby Olivier saying it "remains striking, even after the thousandth play". Richard Milner of Grunge included "Believer" on his list of "5 Rock Songs from the Last Decade That Changed Us Forever", saying that it was the band's most "emotionally stirring" song with a "catchy" chorus and lyrics with a "hard and necessary truth, that pain is a superb teacher", saying that its lyrics made a "lasting, widespread impression" and that its various lyrical interpretations "[brought people] all, ultimately, together".

== Commercial performance ==
As of June 2017, "Believer" had reached number 13 on the US Billboard Hot 100, which was their highest on the chart since "Demons" peaking at number six, and number four on the Billboard Hot Rock & Alternative Songs chart. It topped the THR Top TV Songs chart for May 2017 upon appearing in Riverdale, amassing 307,000 Shazam tags, 303,000 downloads, and 37 million streams throughout the month. "Believer" peaked at number four on the Hot 100, which made it the band's third single to reach the top ten on the chart after "Radioactive" and "Demons". It was also their ninth song to reach the top ten on the Billboard Hot Rock & Alternative Songs chart, which it topped for 29 weeks. The song also topped the Alternative Songs chart for 13 weeks, and Adult Pop Airplay for six weeks, making it their first song to top the chart. Among component charts, it also topped Rock Airplay, Rock Streaming Songs, Rock Digital Sale Songs, and Top TV Commercials Charts. It also topped the Canada Alternative Rock Chart. "Believer" broke the 14-year-old record for the most spins on the Mediabase Alternative chart.

"Believer" was the number one song on several Billboard year-end charts, including the Hot Rock Songs chart, the Rock Airplay chart, and the Alternative Songs chart. The song was the fifth best-selling song of 2017 in the United States, selling 1,598,000 copies in the year. In late 2023, for the 35th anniversary of Alternative Songs (which by then had been renamed to Alternative Airplay), Billboard published a list of the top 100 most successful songs in the chart's history; "Believer" was ranked at number 43.

As of August 2023, the song had received more than two billion streams on Spotify.

== Music video ==
The official music video for the song, which is about "finding a place of peace and self-confidence", was released on March 7, 2017. Directed by Matt Eastin, features a boxing match between Reynolds and Dolph Lundgren. It was the first music video that Lundgren appeared in. Reynolds said that Lundgren was a "friend of a friend" and was "into [appearing in the music video] once we told him he could punch me in the face". Reynolds took boxing lessons for a month to get into fighting shape in preparation. One moment in the video that Reynolds said he believed was kept, he said went "too far": "Dolph caught me with a straight right to the jaw on accident and almost knocked me out". Lundgren said that Reynolds was a "worthy opponent" and that some of his punches "would have shaken Rocky Balboa".

Caroline McCormack of The Heights awarded the music video three-and-a-half out of five stars, saying that it is a "lively, colorful interpretation of the track" with a "futuristic feel" and that the band's appearance and the music "stand as a backdrop to the storyline of the fight", concluding that the video "will demand that audiences watch and pay attention". The music video for "Believer" was the most watched rock video of the 2010s in the United States according to Vevo, receiving over 158 million views in the U.S. By June 2026, it had received over three billion views.

== Live performances ==
The song was performed in July 2023, of which the performance was then released as a single from the band's live documentary Live in Vegas. Early in the performance, Reynolds gets tripped up and laughs to himself. At a GLAAD event, after discussing the song and praising Tranter, who was hosting the event and called Reynolds "the definition of an ally", Tranter and Reynolds performed a duet of "Believer".

== Usage in media ==
By November 2017, "Believer" had been synchronized more than 32 times, including for a Jeep Celebration Event as bonus promotion. The song was used the first two trailers of the 2017 adaptation of Murder on the Orient Express and the Riverdale season 1 finale episode "Chapter Thirteen: The Sweet Hereafter". Bonner Bolton and Sharna Burgess performed an Argentine tango the song in the 24th season of Dancing with the Stars. The song was used in a Nintendo Switch commercial shown during Super Bowl LI. Upon its usage in the commercial, the song debuted at number two on the Billboard Top TV Commercials chart. A remake of the song by metalcore band Hanabie. was used as the main theme for Japanese TV drama Kenshiro ni Yoroshiku.

== Credits and personnel ==
Adapted from Apple Music, except where noted.

Imagine Dragons

- Dan Reynolds – lead vocals, keyboards, songwriter
- Ben McKee – background vocals, bass, songwriter
- Daniel Platzman – drums, background vocals, songwriter
- Wayne Sermon – guitar, background vocals, songwriter

Additional personnel

- Robin Fredriksson – songwriter, producer, engineer
- Mattias Larsson – songwriter, producer, engineer
- Justin Tranter – songwriter
- Alex da Kid – songwriter
- John Hanes – mixing engineer
- Serban Ghenea – mixing engineer
- Tom Coyne – mastering engineer

== Track listing ==
Digital download
No.	Title	Length
1.	"Believer"	3:24

Digital download – Remix featuring Lil Wayne
No.	Title	Length
1.	"Believer" (featuring Lil Wayne)	3:39

Digital download – Kaskade Remix
No.	Title	Length
1.	"Believer" (Kaskade Remix)	3:10

== Charts ==
=== Weekly charts ===
Chart (2017–2022)	Peak position
Australia (ARIA)	33
Austria (Ö3 Austria Top 40)	3
Belarus Airplay (Eurofest)	3
Belgium (Ultratop 50 Flanders)	40
Belgium (Ultratop 50 Wallonia)	20
Canada Hot 100 (Billboard)	7
Canada Rock (Billboard)	1
CIS Airplay (TopHit)	17
Czech Republic Airplay (ČNS IFPI)	3
Czech Republic Singles Digital (ČNS IFPI)	4
France (SNEP)	7
Germany (GfK)	23
Global 200 (Billboard)	52
Hungary (Rádiós Top 40)	27
Hungary (Single Top 40)	7
Ireland (IRMA)	33
Italy (FIMI)	5
Latvia (DigiTop100)	64
Mexico Airplay (Billboard)	28
Netherlands (Dutch Top 40)	35
Netherlands (Single Top 100)	40
New Zealand (Recorded Music NZ)	21
Norway (VG-lista)	13
Philippines (Philippine Hot 100)	89
Poland Airplay (ZPAV)	5
Portugal (AFP)	10
Romania Airplay (UPFR)	1
Russia Airplay (TopHit)	18
Scottish Singles Sales (Official Charts)	19
Slovakia Airplay (ČNS IFPI)	43
Slovakia Singles Digital (ČNS IFPI)	6
Spain (Promusicae)	39
Sweden (Sverigetopplistan)	22
Switzerland (Schweizer Hitparade)	6
UK Singles (Official Charts)	42
US Billboard Hot 100	4
US Adult Contemporary (Billboard)	11
US Adult Pop Airplay (Billboard)	1
US Dance Airplay (Billboard)	10
US Hot Rock & Alternative Songs (Billboard)	1
US Pop Airplay (Billboard)	3
US Rock & Alternative Airplay (Billboard)	1

2023 weekly chart performance for "Believer"
Chart (2023)	Peak position
India International (IMI)	12

=== Year-end charts ===
Chart (2017)	Position
Australia (ARIA)	72
Austria (Ö3 Austria Top 40)	8
Belgium (Ultratop Flanders)	71
Belgium (Ultratop Wallonia)	63
Brazil (Pro-Música Brasil)	88
Canada (Canadian Hot 100)	12
Denmark (Tracklisten)	89
France (SNEP)	30
Germany (Official German Charts)	37
Hungary (Single Top 40)	13
Hungary (Stream Top 40)	3
Iceland (Tónlistinn)	15
Italy (FIMI)	10
Latvia Airplay (LaIPA)	10
Netherlands (Single Top 100)	70
New Zealand (Recorded Music NZ)	36
Poland Airplay (ZPAV)	63
Portugal (AFP)	9
Romania (Airplay 100)	95
Russia (Tophit)	61
Sweden (Sverigetopplistan)	47
Switzerland (Schweizer Hitparade)	9
UK Singles (OCC)	97
US Billboard Hot 100	9
US Adult Contemporary (Billboard)	33
US Adult Top 40 (Billboard)	3
US Dance/Mix Show Airplay (Billboard)	37
US Hot Rock & Alternative Songs (Billboard)	1
US Mainstream Top 40 (Billboard)	15
US Rock Airplay (Billboard)	1
Chart (2018)	Position
Australia (ARIA)	99
CIS (Tophit)	23
France (SNEP)	128
Hungary (Single Top 40)	34
Portugal (AFP)	84
US Billboard Hot 100	100
US Adult Contemporary (Billboard)	22
US Hot Rock & Alternative Songs (Billboard)	3
Chart (2019)	Position
Hungary (Single Top 40)	97
Portugal (AFP)	121
South Korea (Gaon)	85
US Rolling Stone Top 100	82
Chart (2021)	Position
Brazil Streaming (Pro-Música Brasil)	191
France (SNEP)	174
Global 200 (Billboard)	53
Hungary (Single Top 40)	89
US Hot Rock & Alternative Songs (Billboard)	81
Chart (2022)	Position
Australia (ARIA)	81
Brazil (Pro-Música Brasil)	192
Global 200 (Billboard)	45
Ukraine Airplay (TopHit)	198
Chart (2023)	Position
Global 200 (Billboard)	60
Chart (2024)	Position
France (SNEP)	167
Global 200 (Billboard)	73
India International (IMI)	17
Chart (2025)	Position
Global 200 (Billboard)	88

=== Decade-end charts ===
Chart (2010–2019)	Position
US Hot Rock Songs (Billboard)	1

== Certifications and sales ==
Region	Certification	Certified units/sales
Australia (ARIA)	15× Platinum	1,050,000^{‡}
Austria (IFPI Austria)	3× Platinum	90,000^{‡}
Belgium (BRMA)	2× Platinum	80,000^{‡}
Brazil (Pro-Música Brasil)	7× Diamond	1,750,000^{‡}
Canada (Music Canada)	7× Platinum	560,000^{‡}
Denmark (IFPI Danmark)	2× Platinum	180,000^{‡}
France (SNEP)	Diamond	233,333^{‡}
Germany (BVMI)	Diamond	1,000,000^{‡}
India (IMI)	46× Platinum	5,520,000
Italy (FIMI)	5× Platinum	250,000^{‡}
New Zealand (RMNZ)	9× Platinum	270,000^{‡}
Norway (IFPI Norway)	3× Platinum	180,000^{‡}
Poland (ZPAV)	2× Diamond	500,000^{‡}
Portugal (AFP)	5× Platinum	50,000^{‡}
Spain (Promusicae)	4× Platinum	240,000^{‡}
Sweden (GLF)	2× Platinum	80,000^{‡}
United Kingdom (BPI)	5× Platinum	3,000,000^{‡}
United States (RIAA)	14× Platinum	14,000,000^{‡}
Streaming
Greece (IFPI Greece)	Platinum	2,000,000^{†}
Japan (RIAJ)	Gold	50,000,000^{†}
Summaries
Worldwide (IFPI)	—	15,400,000 (Note: Global year-end sales for "Believer" in 2017 and 2019.)
^{‡} Sales+streaming figures based on certification alone.^{†} Streaming-only figures based on certification alone.

== See also ==
- Believer (2018 American film)
