= Matthew Leutwyler =

American writer, director, and producer (born 1969)

- Born: July 23, 1969 (age 57); San Francisco, California, United States
- Education: San Francisco Art Institute

Matthew Steven Leutwyler (born July 23, 1969), is an American screenplay writer, film director, and producer.

== Life and career ==
Leutwyler studied film at The San Francisco Art Institute.

His first feature film was the dark comedy/road picture Road Kill starring Jennifer Rubin, Erik Palladino, Brian Vander Ark, Anthony Denison, Jeffrey Dean Morgan and Jon Polito. Made on a budget of $180,000, the film premiered at the 1999 Santa Barbara International Film Festival where it won the Audience Award for Best Feature Film.

Leutwyler wrote and directed the comedy/horror/musical Dead & Breakfast (South by Southwest Film Festival 2004), starring Jeremy Sisto, Jeffrey Dean Morgan, and David Carradine. The film went on to win over a dozen audience and best feature film awards around the world and was nominated for a Saturn Award. Since then he has produced or exec produced The Oh in Ohio starring Parker Posey and Paul Rudd; Lower Learning with Eva Longoria, Jason Biggs, and Rob Corddry; Against the Current with Joseph Fiennes, Mary Tyler Moore and Justin Kirk (Sundance Film Festival 2009); the Matthew Broderick and Sanaa Lathan drama Wonderful World (Tribeca 2010); and Every Day, starring Helen Hunt and Liev Schreiber (Tribeca Film Festival 2011).

May 6, 2011 Deadline Hollywood announced that he will be producing the Catherine Hardwicke (Twilight)-directed drama The Bitch Posse. He will be producing alongside his Ambush Entertainment partner Miranda Bailey and Title IX partners Virginia Madsen and Karly Meola.

Leutwyler directed the adaptation of the novel The River Why (Mill Valley Film Festival 2010) starring William Hurt, Zach Gilford, and Amber Heard. He also exec produced James Gunn's Super (Toronto International Film Festival 2012) starring Rainn Wilson and Elliot Page; the 3D horror comedy Hellbenders and the comedy-drama The Girl Most Likely, starring Kristen Wiig and Annette Bening (Toronto International Film Festival 2011). He wrote and directed the ensemble drama Answers to Nothing starring Dane Cook, Barbara Hershey, and Julie Benz.

He produced the award-winning food documentary Spinning Plates (2014).

Leutwyler co-founded the theatrical distributor The Film Arcade in 2012. For two years, he worked on the marketing of Joey Soloway's Sundance winner and Independent Spirit Award nominee Afternoon Delight starring Kathryn Hahn and Jane Lynch, as well as other Sundance entries The Other Dream Team, and A.C.O.D. with Amy Poehler, Adam Scott, and Jessica Alba. He left the company in 2014.

On January 31, 2015, Leutwyler premiered Uncanny at the Santa Barbara International Film Festival. Uncanny is a science fiction film about the world's first "perfect" Artificial Intelligence who begins to exhibit startling and unnerving emergent behavior when a reporter begins a relationship with the scientist who created it.

== Filmography ==
Year	Title	Director	Writer	Editor
1999	Road Kill	Yes	Yes	No
1999	This Space Between Us	Yes	Yes	No
2004	Dead & Breakfast	Yes	Yes	No
2007	Unearthed	Yes	No	No
2010	The River Why	Yes	Yes	Yes
2011	Answers to Nothing	Yes	Yes	Yes
2015	Uncanny	Yes	No	Yes
2016	Swipe	Yes	No	No
2023	Fight Like A Girl	Yes	Yes	No

Producer

- Lower Learning (2008)
- Wonderful World (2008)
- Every Day (2010)
- Spinning Plates (2013)
- The Bitch Posse (2014)

Executive producer

- The Oh in Ohio (2006)
- Against the Current (2009)
- Super (2010)
- Imogene (2013)
- Hellbenders (2013)

Television

Year	Title	Director	Writer	Producer	Notes
2001	Undressed	Yes	No	No	8 episodes
2009	Stuck	Yes	Yes	Yes	TV movie
2018	Voluntees, a Rwandan Comedy	Yes	Yes	Executive	TV movie
2020	State of Siege: 26/11	Yes	No	No	Web series
