= Ambush Entertainment =

Ambush Entertainment is a Los Angeles based, artist driven, independent film production company that, with its financing arm Cold Iron Pictures, is dedicated to producing provocative, diverse, and original feature films, television and web content aimed at appealing to a wide audience.

== List of Ambush Entertainment Films ==
Year	Films and Documentaries	Cast	Director
2004	Dead and Breakfast	Ever Carradine, Bianca Lawson, Erik Palladino, Gina Phillips, Jeremy Sisto, David Carradine, Diedrich Bader, Portia de Rossi, Jeffrey Dean Morgan, Oz Perkins, Brent Fraser, Miranda Bailey	Matthew Leutwyler
2005	The Squid and the Whale	Jeff Daniels, Laura Linney, Jesse Eisenberg, Owen Kline	Noah Baumbach
2006	The Oh in Ohio	Parker Posey, Paul Rudd, Danny DeVito, Mischa Barton, Miranda Bailey, Liza Minnelli	Billy Kent
2007	Unearthed	Emmanuelle Vaugier, Luke Goss, Charlie Murphy, Beau Garrett	Matthew Leutwyler
2008	Hindsight	Leonor Varela, Jeffrey Donovan, Miranda Bailey, Waylon Payne	Paul Holahan
2008	Lower Learning	Jason Biggs, Rob Corddry, Eva Longoria Parker, Monica Potter, Will Sasso, Kyle Gass, Hayes MacArthur, Miranda Bailey	Mark Lafferty
2009	Against the Current	Joseph Fiennes, Michelle Trachtenberg, Justin Kirk, Elizabeth Reaser, and Mary Tyler Moore	Peter Callahan
2009	Wonderful World	Matthew Broderick, Sanaa Lathan, Philip Baker Hall	Joshua Goldin
2010	Super	Rainn Wilson, Elliot Page, (Note: Credited as Ellen Page) Liv Tyler, Kevin Bacon and Nathan Fillion	James Gunn
2010	Every Day	Liev Schreiber, Helen Hunt, Brian Dennehy, Carla Gugino and Ezra Miller	Richard Levine
2010	Greenlit (Documentary)		Miranda Bailey
2010	The River Why	Zach Gilford, Amber Heard, Kathleen Quinlan, and William Hurt	Matthew Leutwyler
2011	Unraveled		Marc H. Simon
2011	Answers to Nothing	Dane Cook, Elizabeth Mitchell, Julie Benz, Barbara Hershey, Zach Gilford, Erik Palladino, Kali Hawk, Miranda Bailey	Matthew Leutwyler

== Upcoming Projects ==
2012 looks to be a busy year for Ambush Entertainment. They signed on to produce the adaptation of Martha O' Connor's novel "The Bitch Posse" to be directed by Catherine Hardwicke who also directed "Twilight" and "Red Riding Hood" among others. Also on tap is the sci-fi thriller "Below The Surface" based on a John Kelly script and to be directed by "The Eye" and "Them" director Xavier Palud Other Projects slated for 2012 include:

- Spinning Plates - Spinning Plates is a feature documentary film about three restaurants, extraordinary for what they are today as well as the challenges they have overcome.
- Labor of Love - Labor of Love tells the story of Susan Austin and Lance Gilman who run the world famous Mustang Ranch brothel. With Susan's smarts and Lance's savvy, they are redefining what a brothel can be. From sponsored athletes and live events to concerts, motocross competitions, MMA fights, and unique Mustang Games, they're charting a new course.
