= This Space Between Us =

- Directed by: Matthew Leutwyler
- Starring: Jeremy Sisto
- Release date: 1999
- Running time: 98 minutes
- Country: United States
- Language: English

This Space Between Us is a 1999 film directed by Matthew Leutwyler and starring Jeremy Sisto and Poppy Montgomery. It won the Moxie Award at the 2000 Santa Monica Film Festival.

== Cast ==
- Jeremy Sisto as Alex Harty
- Poppy Montgomery as Arden Anfield
- Erik Palladino as Jesse Fleer
- Clara Bellar as Zoe Goddard
- Vincent Ventresca as Sterling Montrose
- Vanessa Marcil as Maggie Harty
