= Night Visions (disambiguation) =

Night Visions is a 2012 album by Imagine Dragons.

Night Visions may also refer to:

- Night Visions (book series), a horror fiction series
- Night Visions (film), a 1990 television film directed by Wes Craven
- Night Visions (film festival), a biannual film festival held in Helsinki, Finland
- Night Visions (TV series), a 2001 American horror anthology series
- Night Visions Tour, the Imagine Dragons tour promoting the album
- Night Visions Live, a 2014 live album by Imagine Dragons
- The night visions of Zechariah in chapters 1-6 of the Book of Zechariah

== See also ==
- Night Vision (disambiguation)
