= Night Visions Live =

Live album and video by Imagine Dragons
- Released: February 25, 2014
- Recorded: May 16, 2013
- Venues: Red Rocks Amphitheatre (Denver, Colorado)
- Genres: Alternative rock; pop rock
- Length: 61:41
- Labels: Kidinakorner; Interscope
- Producer: Alexander Grant

Imagine Dragons chronology
iTunes Session (2013)	Night Visions Live (2014)	Smoke + Mirrors (2015)

Night Visions Live is the second live album by American rock band Imagine Dragons. Recorded during a live performance at the Red Rocks Amphitheatre on May 16, 2013, during the Night Visions Tour, the album was released by Kidinakorner and Interscope Records on February 25, 2014. Physical copies of the album and video include the 2012 documentary The Making of Night Visions, and the band's music videos produced during the Night Visions album cycle.

The live album would eventually be included on the super deluxe expanded edition of Night Visions, which was released on September 9, 2022 for the album's 10 year anniversary.

== Background ==
In 2012, Imagine Dragons released Night Visions to commercial success. To promote the album, the band set out on a year-long concert tour beginning in early 2013 and ending in mid-2014, dubbed the "Night Visions Tour". The tour spanned for over 170 dates, and visited North America, South America, Europe and Oceania.

== Recording ==
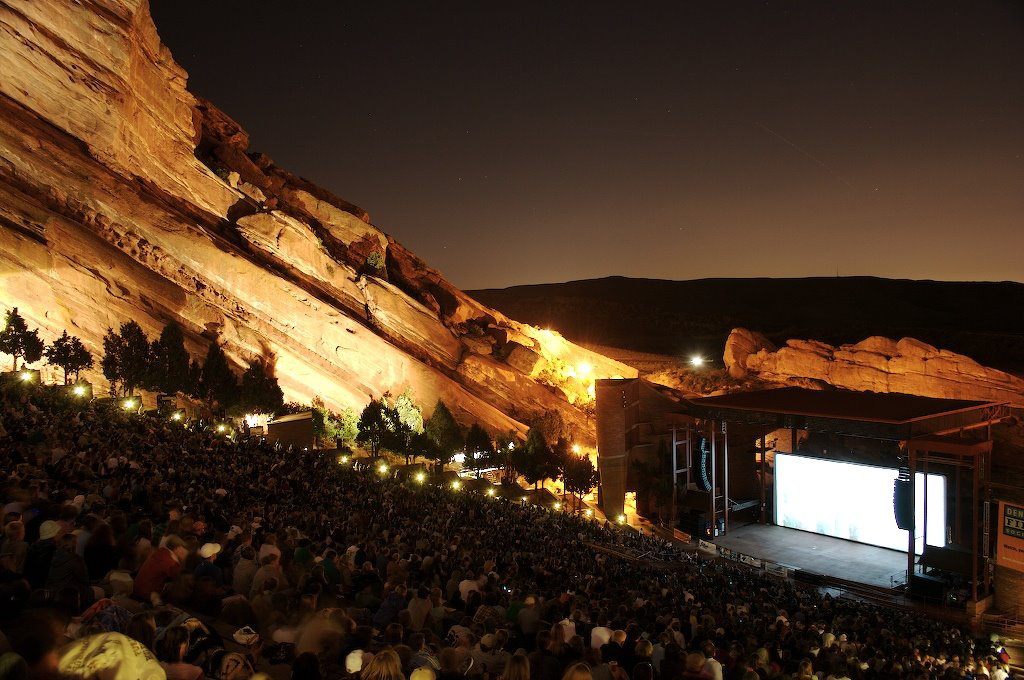
The Red Rocks Amphitheatre, where the album was recorded on May 16, 2013.

Night Visions Live was recorded during the band's performance at the Red Rocks Amphitheatre in Denver, Colorado on the May 16, 2013 date of their year-long Night Visions Tour. The venue, which holds just under 9,500 people, had sold out for the performance, which was held for one night only. The show's setlist, however, did not reflect the track listing of Night Visions Live. The show's setlist, for example, opened with "Round and Round", the usual opening song during a set list on the Night Visions Tour. The show progressed with "Amsterdam", "Tiptoe", "Hear Me", "Cha-Ching (Till We Grow Older)", "Rocks", "Radioactive", "30 Lives", "Bleeding Out", "Demons", then a cover of Ben E. King's "Stand by Me", then "Underdog" and "On Top of the World" before ending the show with "It's Time", and staging an encore with "Nothing Left to Say", the usual set list closer for the tour.

The video, however, followed the setlist in chronological order, but omitting the performances of "Hear me", "Radioactive", "30 lives", "Bleeding Out", "Stand By Me", "On Top of the World" and the encore with "Nothing Left to Say". The performance itself lasted under two hours, and had been described by A.H. Goldstein of Denver-based alternative weekly newspaper Westword as "a well-honed, big-budget stageshow that would have fit neatly into any stadium or any glitzy room in its native Las Vegas". The recorded performance became the second live album by the band after Live at Independent Records, which was also recorded in Denver, Colorado. Lead singer Dan Reynolds was also notably suffering from a broken hand during the performance, having broken it after punching a drum during a May 2013 performance, making it, coincidentally, the second live recording during which Reynolds was suffering from a medical condition; Live at Independent Records was recorded when Reynolds was recovering from throat surgery.

The show was one of many that were recorded during the Night Visions Tour on audio-visual for a potential release during or after the tour, before the end of the Night Visions release cycle. The performances recorded include the opening night of the Night Visions Tour on December 30, 2012 at The Joint in Las Vegas, Nevada, which was later used for a live video of "Radioactive" and parts of the music video for "Demons", which, in part, was combined with footage of the February 9, 2013 performance at the same venue.

== Track listing ==
All tracks are written by Ben McKee, Dan Reynolds and Wayne Sermon, except where noted.

Night Visions Live
No.	Title	Writer(s)	Length
1.	"Radioactive"	McKee; Reynolds; Sermon; Alexander Grant; Josh Mosser	6:44
2.	"Hear Me"		4:54
3.	"On Top of the World"	McKee; Reynolds; Sermon; Grant	3:22
4.	"Round and Round"	McKee; Reynolds; Sermon; Grant	3:38
5.	"Amsterdam"		4:11
6.	"Tip Toe"		5:35
7.	"Cha-Ching"	Clint Holgate; McKee; Reynolds; Sermon	4:43
8.	"Rocks"		3:43
9.	"Demons"	McKee; Reynolds; Sermon; Grant; Mosser	3:16
10.	"Underdog"		4:18
11.	"It's Time"		5:30
12.	"It's Time" (Live London Sessions Acoustic)		4:10
13.	"Radioactive" (Live London Sessions Acoustic)	McKee; Reynolds; Sermon; Grant; Mosser	4:30
14.	"Demons" (Live London Sessions Acoustic)	McKee; Reynolds; Sermon; Grant; Mosser	3:07
Total length:			61:41

Disc 2, Part 1 - The Making of Night Visions
No.	Title	Length
1.	"Intro"
2.	"In the Studio Part 1" / "Alex Da Kid"
3.	"Radioactive"
4.	"Las Vegas" / "Beginning Days"
5.	"In the Studio Part 2"
6.	"Demons"
7.	"In the Studio Part 3"
8.	"Hear Me"
9.	"In the Studio Part 4" / "Album Planning"
10.	"In the Studio Part 5" / "Every Night" / "Reflection"
11.	"In the Studio Part 6" / "On Top of the World"
12.	"End Credits"

Disc 2, Part 2 - Live at Red Rocks
No.	Title	Length
1.	"Show Intro"
2.	"Round and Round"
3.	"Amsterdam"
4.	"Tip Toe"
5.	"Cha-Ching"
6.	"Rocks"
7.	"Demons"
8.	"Underdog"
9.	"It's Time"

Disc 2, Part 3 - Music videos
No.	Title	Director(s)	Length
1.	"It's Time"	Anthony Leonardi	4:07
2.	"Radioactive"	Syndrome	4:22
3.	"Demons"	Isaac Halasima	3:57
4.	"On Top of the World"	Matt Eastin; Corey Fox	4:02

== Personnel ==
Imagine Dragons

- Dan Reynolds – vocals, percussion
- Wayne Sermon – guitar, percussion, backing vocals
- Ben McKee – bass, percussion, backing vocals, keyboards
- Daniel Platzman – drums, viola, backing vocals
- Ryan Walker (touring member) – keyboards, electric guitar, drums, backing vocals, electric mandolin, acoustic guitar

Technical

- Alexander Grant – production

== Certifications ==
Region	Certification	Certified units/sales
Mexico (AMPROFON)	2× Platinum	120,000^{^}
^{^} Shipments figures based on certification alone.

== Release history ==
Region	Date	Format	Label	Catalog no.
Canada	February 25, 2014	CD+DVD	KIDinaKORNER; Interscope Records	0253773521
United States	February 25, 2014	CD+DVD	KIDinaKORNER; Interscope Records	0253773521
Ukraine	March 4, 2014	Digital download	Interscope Records	none
Australia	April 4, 2014	CD+DVD	Interscope Records	unknown
New Zealand	April 4, 2014	CD+DVD	Interscope Records	unknown
France	April 7, 2014	CD+DVD	Interscope Records	unknown
Germany	April 7, 2014	CD+DVD	Interscope Records	unknown
United Kingdom	April 7, 2014	CD+DVD	Interscope Records	unknown
