= ER season 7 =

ER
- Season 7
- DVD cover
- Starring: Anthony Edwards; Noah Wyle; Laura Innes; Alex Kingston; Paul McCrane; Goran Visnjic; Maura Tierney; Michael Michele; Erik Palladino; Ming-Na; Eriq La Salle
- No. of episodes: 22

Release
- Original network: NBC
- Original release: October 12, 2000 – May 17, 2001

Season chronology
- ← Previous; Season 6 Next → Season 8

The seventh season of the American fictional drama television series ER first aired on NBC on October 12, 2000, and concluded on May 17, 2001. The seventh season consists of 22 episodes.

== Plot ==
In the midst of being remodeled, for a more open, safe floorplan, the show's seventh season starts with John Carter completing his drug rehabilitation and trying to be who he was before he got stabbed, with the support of Abby Lockhart. Abby's own life is in disarray after she is forced to drop out of medical school, her bipolar mother Maggie Wyczenski comes to stay, her new romance with Luka Kovač hits many pitfalls, and she reaches a crossroads in her Nurse position at County. Mark Greene and Elizabeth Corday decide to buy a house together and get married, but tragedy ensues when Mark is diagnosed with terminal cancer, giving him only weeks to live. Meanwhile, Elizabeth discovers that she is pregnant. Kerry Weaver also has some issues of her own as she deals with her new life. Benton tries to find a new spot at County. Not wanting to upset Elizabeth – who is caught up in a malpractice suit – Mark keeps his illness a secret. After successful surgery, he and Elizabeth get married, with her heavily pregnant when they get married. In the 150th episode of ER, a massive train wreck mobilizes the ER doctors and nurses to the scene.

== Cast ==
=== Main cast ===
- Anthony Edwards as Dr. Mark Greene – Attending Emergency Physician
- Noah Wyle as Dr. John Carter – Fourth-year ER Resident
- Laura Innes as Dr. Kerry Weaver – Chief of Emergency Medicine
- Alex Kingston as Dr. Elizabeth Corday – Associate Chief of Surgery
- Paul McCrane as Dr. Robert Romano – Chief of Staff and Chief of Surgery
- Goran Visnjic as Dr. Luka Kovač – Attending Emergency Physician
- Maura Tierney as Nurse Abby Lockhart – Fourth-year Rotating Medical Student and RN
- Michael Michele as Dr. Cleo Finch – Third-year Pediatric Emergency Medicine Resident
- Erik Palladino as Dr. Dave Malucci – Third-year ER Resident
- Ming-Na as Dr. Jing-Mei Chen – Fourth-year ER Resident
- Eriq La Salle as Dr. Peter Benton – Attending Trauma Surgeon

=== Supporting cast ===
Doctors and medical students

- Sam Anderson as Dr. Jack Kayson – Chief of Cardiology
- Amy Aquino as Dr. Janet Coburn – Chief of Obstetrics and Gynecology
- John Aylward as Dr. Donald Anspaugh – Surgical Attending Physician and Hospital Board Member
- Elizabeth Mitchell as Dr. Kim Legaspi – Psychiatrist
- David Brisbin as Dr. Alexander Babcock – Anesthesiologist
- John Doman as Dr. Carl DeRaad – Chief of Psychiatry
- Megan Cole as Dr. Alice Upton – Pathologist
- Iqbal Theba as Dr. Zagerby – Ophthalmologist

Nurses

- Ellen Crawford as Nurse Lydia Wright
- Conni Marie Brazelton as Nurse Conni Oligario
- Deezer D as Nurse Malik McGrath
- Laura Cerón as Nurse Chuny Marquez
- Yvette Freeman as Nurse Manager Haleh Adams
- Lily Mariye as Nurse Lily Jarvik
- Gedde Watanabe as Nurse Yosh Takata
- Dinah Lenney as Nurse Shirley
- Kyle Richards as Nurse Dori Kerns
- Lucy Rodriguez as Nurse Bjerke
- Morris Chestnut as ICU Nurse Frank 'Rambo' Bacon
- Elizabeth Rodriguez as Nurse Sandra
- Mary Heiss as Nurse Mary

Staff, paramedics and officers

- Troy Evans as Desk Clerk Frank Martin
- Kristin Minter as Desk Clerk Miranda "Randi" Fronczak
- Pamela Sinha as Desk Clerk Amira
- Erica Gimpel as Social Worker Adele Newman
- Skip Stellrecht as Chaplain Miller
- Emily Wagner as Paramedic Doris Pickman
- Montae Russell as Paramedic Dwight Zadro
- Lynn Alicia Henderson as Paramedic Pamela Olbes
- Demetrius Navarro as Paramedic Morales
- Brian Lester as Paramedic Brian Dumar
- Michelle Bonilla as Paramedic Christine Harms
- Claudine Claudio as Paramedic Silva
- Meg Thalken as Chopper EMT Dee McManus
- Ed Lauter as Fire Captain Dannaker
- Chad McKnight as Officer Wilson
- David Roberson as Officer Durcy
- Joe Basile as Officer Tom Bennini

Family

- Frances Sternhagen as Millicent Carter
- Jonathan Scarfe as Chase Carter
- George Plimpton as Grandpa Carter
- Sally Field as Maggie Wyczenski
- Mark Valley as Richard Lockhart
- Nancy Kwan as Mrs. Chen
- Christine Harnos as Jennifer Simon
- Khandi Alexander as Jackie Robbins
- Andrew McFarlane as Jesse Robbins
- Lisa Nicole Carson as Carla Simmons
- Victor Williams as Roger McGrath
- Matthew Watkins as Reese Benton
- Paul Freeman as Dr. Charles Corday
- Judy Parfitt as Isabelle Corday
- Keith Robinson as William White

=== Notable guest stars ===
- Wentworth Miller as Mike Palmieri
- Alan Dale as Al Patterson
- Chris Sarandon as Dr. Burke (New York)
- James Cromwell as Bishop Lionel Stewart
- Zachery Ty Bryan as Upsilon Psi Lambda Frat Brother
- Lourdes Benedicto as Rena Trujillo
- Jim Belushi as Dan Harris
- Jared Padalecki as Paul Harris
- Jeffrey Dean Morgan as Larkin
- Eric Stonestreet as Willie
- Josh Peck as Nick Stevens
- Alan Young as Archie Mellonston

== Production ==
Original executive producers John Wells and Michael Crichton reprised their roles. Sixth season co-executive producers Neal Baer and Jack Orman were promoted to executive producers for the seventh season. Baer left the crew mid-season. Previous executive producer Christopher Chulack remained a consulting producer while working on Wells' Third Watch. Meredith Stiehm joined the crew as a co-executive producer mid-season.

R. Scott Gemmill returned as supervising producer and was joined by new supervising producer Dee Johnson. Long-time crew member Joe Sachs joined the production team as a co-producer for the seventh season and was promoted to producer mid-season. Wendy Spence Rosato and Richard Thorpe returned as producers. Jonathan Kaplan began the seventh season as a consulting producer but returned to his previous role as producer mid-season. Regular director Christopher Misiano joined the crew as a producer for the seventh season only. Michael Salamunovich returned as a co-producer and Teresa Salamunovich continued in her role as associate producer until the mid-season break.

Wells wrote two further episodes. Orman was the series' most prolific writer with seven episodes. Baer contributed a single episode. Gemmill wrote four further episodes and new producers Johnson and Stiehm each wrote three episodes. Sachs wrote a further episode. Former producer Walon Green wrote a single episode. Tom Garrigus joined the writing staff as an executive story editor and contributed to two episodes but left the crew with the close of the season. New writer Elizabeth Hunter contributed a single episode.

Producers Kaplan, Thorpe, and Misiano served as the seasons regular directors. Kaplan helmed six episodes while Thorpe and Misiano directed three each. Chulack directed a further episode. Returning directors were executive producer John Wells, cast members Anthony Edwards and Laura Innes, series veterans Lesli Linka Glatter, Félix Enríquez Alcalá, David Nutter, Marita Grabiak, and Tom Moore. Guy Norman Bee was the season's only new director.

== Episodes ==
No. overall	No. in season	Title	Directed by	Written by	Original release date	Prod. code	US viewers (millions)
136	1	"Homecoming"	Jonathan Kaplan	Jack Orman	October 12, 2000	226251	29.33
Cleaning employees and construction workers strike at County General, Carter comes back out of rehab, a football game riot continues in the ER, and Greene and Corday come back from their vacation only to find out they have a terrible rash. Abby finds out that her ex-husband did not pay her tuition and therefore she cannot continue her ER clerkship. Chen is pregnant.
137	2	"Sand and Water"	Christopher Misiano	Jack Orman	October 19, 2000	226252	25.92
Carter returns to County General and accepts Greene and Weaver's stringent terms for him to return to work. Abby becomes his AA sponsor, and she clashes with several doctors while helping a couple whose premature baby boy will die within hours. Greene and Corday are buying a bigger house and decide to get married. Benton has trouble with Romano over a surgery for a patient whose insurance does not cover him anymore, and Luka and Kerry agree in spirit but disagree in policy over a case where a woman's same-sex partner is not legally allowed to make medical decisions on her behalf.
138	3	"Mars Attacks"	Paris Barclay	R. Scott Gemmill	October 26, 2000	226253	26.09
On a short-staffed day, Weaver limits Carter's tasks but leads him to spend a useful day with a paralyzed kid, Kovač needs Abby to do medical procedures she is no longer cleared to do, Benton finds out Romano retaliated against him over the previous episode's insurance issue, and injured attendees from a sci-fi convention are rushed in.
139	4	"Benton Backwards"	Richard Thorpe	Dee Johnson	November 2, 2000	226254	27.81
Romano offers a per diem position to Benton with no benefits and no stature. After being unable to both find a job elsewhere and remain Reese's father, a broken Benton is forced to accept. Kovač and Abby go on a date and are attacked by a mugger whom Kovač ends up unintentionally killing in the scuffle. Carter is allowed to handle trauma patients again, within reasons. Right after he saves a serious gunshot wound, a young girl enters the room and murders the victim, leaving Carter, the only one in the room at the time, shaken and in shock. Kovač later encourages him to leave early, and he commiserates with a kind Gamma over how he and not the hospital is responsible for his issues.
140	5	"Flight of Fancy"	Lesli Linka Glatter	Joe Sachs & Walon Green	November 9, 2000	226255	28.40
The tragedy of teens diagnosed as HIV-positive is compounded by a fatal street accident. A med-emergency flight with Mark is followed by the transported patient's wedding in the ER. Benton is forced by Romano to run the ER with predictably unimpressive results.
141	6	"The Visit"	Jonathan Kaplan	John Wells	November 16, 2000	226256	31.03
Abby is visited by her bipolar mother Maggie, Benton's nephew comes into the ER with a serious gunshot wound, and Kovač suspects a young girl is being abused by her father. Corday achieves her desire for a weekend getaway with Greene by treating one patient, a Zambian surfer (Alan Dale), too quickly.
142	7	"Rescue Me"	Christopher Chulack	Neal Baer	November 23, 2000	226257	25.79
It is a rainy day at County. Corday is sued for malpractice. Maggie will not leave until Abby talks to her, and Abby gives Maggie some hard truths about what her mom's mental illness and refusal to address it has done to her. Chen's mother (Nancy Kwan) learns of her daughter's pregnancy, and Corday also learns she is pregnant, but Greene has the worst feeling of all when he loses control of his faculties while suturing a patient's laceration and gets extremely bad medical news. Kerry has a "date" with Kim Legaspi but can't fully accept the idea of being attracted to another woman. Additionally, tensions rise between Benton and Cleo and a med tech who had a secret meth lab in the basement pharmacy is treated for a drug overdose. Things come to a head when a patient's smoking ignites the ether smuggled by the tech in IV bags, causing an explosion that injures Abby and evacuates the ER.
143	8	"The Dance We Do"	Christopher Misiano	Jack Orman	December 7, 2000	226258	28.08
Greene reveals to Corday that he had a biopsy and says the tumor is inoperable. While arguing with Carter, Mark goes into a seizure. Abby's mother causes a major ruckus at a department store. Corday attends her deposition for malpractice on her previous patient, the surfer. Benton's nephew's girlfriend comes into the ER.
144	9	"The Greatest of Gifts"	Jonathan Kaplan	Elizabeth Hunter	December 14, 2000	226259	29.84
Chen gives birth, and struggles with the decision to give her baby up for adoption, while Carter's assistance to her and brutal work shift lead to a covert relapse. Benton helps a young girl who is being forced to donate white blood cells to her ill sister. A young boy is brought in for a dog bite to the face and eventually reveals that it was his fault as he shot at the responsible dog with a BB gun he was getting for Christmas. Corday and Greene travel to New York in search of a surgeon who may be able to cure Greene's tumor with a new procedure. After being left to wait for several hours and beginning to lose hope, the surgeon brings the news that Greene's tumor is operable with his procedure.
145	10	"Piece of Mind"	David Nutter	Tom Garrigus & R. Scott Gemmill	January 4, 2001	226260	30.41
On New Year's Eve, County General is absorbed in the case of father and son (James Belushi and Jared Padalecki) who were in a car accident. Both father and son, who were fighting before the accident, experience complications with the father becoming worried that he is going to be responsible for his son's death after learning that the accident occurred following him running a red light. The father reveals that he lost another son to SIDS twenty years before. The father suffers a heart attack; his blocked artery is determined to have caused him to pass out at the wheel, resulting in the accident. Both father and son survive and in the aftermath make up from their fight and become closer. At the same time, Greene undergoes surgery in New York to remove his brain tumor. Despite having a seizure on the operating table and an altered state for a short time afterwards, the surgery is successful and Greene begins his recovery.
146	11	"Rock, Paper, Scissors"	Jonathan Kaplan	Dee Johnson	January 11, 2001	226261	28.35
Kovač treats a bishop (James Cromwell) who took a fall and questions Kovač over the Croatian's loss of faith, with Luka losing his temper when treating a drunk driver who killed or injured several pedestrians. Abby pressures Carter to tell Weaver about the Vicodin he nearly took and tells him that she cannot be his sponsor anymore. After Kynesha is placed with a foster family, Benton and Finch discover their home trashed by her. Corday's malpractice suit is settled on terms that leave her career and finances intact; Mr. Patterson later visits her at the hospital to remind her that her failures led to his paralysis, causing Corday to panic with another patient. Weaver and Legaspi are divided over personal and professional issues. Carter treats a woman smuggling drugs by swallowing a condom full of cocaine.
147	12	"Surrender"	Félix Enríquez Alcalá	Story by : R. Scott Gemmill & Joe Sachs; Teleplay by : Jack Orman	February 1, 2001	226262	26.54
Weaver and Legaspi have spent the night together, although Weaver appears shy of beginning a relationship. She also battles Kovač over calling the authorities (OSHA) about an illegal sweatshop employing one of his patients, which causes the owners to torch the place. Greene is back to work, but is mixing up his pronouns, referring to a male patient as a "she." Corday freezes again during surgery, but is able to overcome her fears. Romano talks Benton into taking a job as County's director of diversity. In the wake of his Vicodin slip and admission to Weaver, Carter is banned from prescribing drugs and starts his probation over again. Later, Benton finds out about his relapse and gets angry at him. He later visits Chase at his home, and admits his addiction. Abby treats two horny old men (Tom Bosley and Tom Poston).
148	13	"Thy Will Be Done"	Richard Thorpe	Story by : Joe Sachs & Meredith Stiehm; Teleplay by : Meredith Stiehm	February 8, 2001	226263	28.20
Bishop Stewart returns, seeking pain medication from Kovač, who also has his hands full dealing with the parents of a 16-year-old (Josh Peck) who has had two heart transplants and doesn't want to live in agonizing pain and have another one. Abby fills in as Carter's date for a Carter family function and sees her ex-husband there, later making sure to ruin his evening. Malucci treats a gay man who wants to contract HIV from his positive partner. Greene continues an abrupt personality change in the wake of his surgery. Weaver makes an appointment for a competency review for Greene.
149	14	"A Walk in the Woods"	John Wells	John Wells	February 15, 2001	226264	26.19
Weaver spends an evening with Legaspi and her lesbian friend (Megan Follows). Greene is furious to learn about his competency review; Corday screams at Weaver about ordering it. Chen returns from maternity leave and treats a young boy with measles that leads her and Carter to confront anti-vaccination parents while dealing with the possibility of more people becoming infected. The boy later dies of his measles infection despite the doctors best efforts. Benton struggles to get a young med student applicant an interview after learning that he himself was only accepted due to affirmative action. Bishop Stewart returns in even worse condition and talks about faith and his decisions with Luka.
150	15	"The Crossing"	Jonathan Kaplan	Jack Orman	February 22, 2001	226265	27.14
Carter meets a new pedes intern, Rena Trujillo. He and Kovač are then dispatched to the site of a major train wreck. Carter must perform a tricky double amputation on an injured firefighter after Corday goes into early contractions at the scene. He is assisted by Dr Benton on the phone. After Corday returns to the hospital, Abby and Chen treat Corday, who is told to stay on bed rest. Benton lets prospective med student William White follow him around the ER. Weaver calls Legaspi for a psych consult on a suicidal girl who caused the train crash by driving her car onto the tracks. Kovač wrestles with his faith, revealing that in Vukovar he could have saved his wife after their building was hit by artillery fire by sacrificing his daughter but instead stayed with his family as they all died. Bishop Stewart grants him absolution before his death.
151	16	"Witch Hunt"	Guy Norman Bee	R. Scott Gemmill	March 1, 2001	226266	25.57
After Abby leaves the room for a second, an infant disappears from the hospital. The baby is later found unharmed on the L-station platform, presumably abandoned by her panicked kidnapper who is never found. After spending the night at her place, Carter is shocked to find out that Rena is a 19-year-old undergraduate. Greene gets his competency results—he passed. Malucci and Greene treat a young boy injecting steroids who is frightened of his father, with Dave's sincere desire to help the kid leading to violence with the parent and a suspension from an unmoved Mark. Legaspi has been accused of sexual misconduct by the teenager who caused the train crash. Weaver is more concerned with hiding their relationship from a prejudiced and wrathful Romano than hiding herself, so Kim dumps her.
152	17	"Survival of the Fittest"	Marita Grabiak	Story by : Elizabeth Hunter; Teleplay by : Joe Sachs	March 29, 2001	226267	24.49
A police officer shoots and kills an elderly patient with dementia, and Benton and Finch deal with the fallout. Carter misinforms Rena and tells her that he and Abby had a past liaison. April Fool's Day causes the staffers to play pranks on each other; Malucci gets the worst of it when Kovač injects him with Haldol, rendering him useless for the rest of the shift and getting his hand glued to his forehead while asleep. Corday endures a particularly long surgery just to prove that she can despite her pregnancy. After the surgery, Corday decides to go on maternity leave while Romano buys her dinner in an unexpected but genuine gesture of kindness. Greene treats three young students who have been huffing carpet cleaner, causing an asthma attack in another bullied student. Though most of the students are fine, one suffers irreparable damage to his liver and will need a liver transplant to live. At the same time, Greene also treats a young woman on fertility drugs who was involved in a car accident. The patient later suffers a stroke that leaves her quadriplegic. It turns out she was planning to sell her eggs to help herself and her husband out of dire financial straits; the husband agrees to allow the procedure to go forward in honor of his wife's wishes. Kovač treats another pregnant teenager who is only having the child to collect welfare checks.
153	18	"April Showers"	Christopher Misiano	Story by : Tom Garrigus & Dee Johnson; Teleplay by : Tom Garrigus	April 19, 2001	226268	24.32
Greene must overcome numerous obstacles, mostly weather-related, in order to get to the church to marry Elizabeth, who is stuck with both of her bickering, divorced parents. Abby has a major cold, but cannot leave the hospital, due to most of the nurses being at the wedding. Many patients come into the ER from an accident involving a prison van; Kovač and Carter clash over the treatment of an injured cop and a prisoner with a dislocated shoulder. While waiting for a flight to Vegas, Weaver (who was not invited to the wedding), strikes up a conversation with a friendly man. Chen misses her son. Cleo does not want to go to the wedding because the bride is Benton's ex-girlfriend.
154	19	"Sailing Away"	Laura Innes	Jack Orman & Meredith Stiehm	April 26, 2001	226269	25.41
Corday goes into labor and delivers a baby girl named Ella. Benton treats his junior high school science teacher (Roger Robinson). Numerous college students come into the ER, victims of fraternity/sorority pledging pranks and hazing rituals. Carter and Abby take a road trip to Oklahoma to pick up Maggie, who has locked herself in a motel room; then she steals sleeping pills from a convenience store and attempts suicide. Rena dumps Carter over the phone.
155	20	"Fear of Commitment"	Anthony Edwards	R. Scott Gemmill	May 3, 2001	226270	21.85
Abby goes to court to argue for a 90-day psych hold for her mother which doesn't happen because Maggie's lies get her released, but Abby's tearful monologue to Maggie about how her mother's untreated mental problems have devastated her seems to finally get through to her mother. Weaver treats an old children's television show host (Bette Ford) and a pair of furries. Carla checks into the hospital after a fall. Benton treats Carl Ferris again after he suffers a heart attack. Malucci clashes with Chen and Cleo when his past track record gets him in trouble with angry or uncommunicative patients. Carter treats a young girl whose boyfriend has been interfering with her pregnancy by feeding her herbal root extracts to cause a miscarriage. Chen treats a patient with a talent for numbers. Malucci later calls in a priest to perform an exorcism.
156	21	"Where the Heart Is"	Richard Thorpe	Dee Johnson & Meredith Stiehm	May 10, 2001	226271	23.17
Abby is flabbergasted when Maggie reveals her plans to move back to her birthplace of Minneapolis. Abby reveals to her mother that she was pregnant once, but had an abortion, scared about the genetic possibility of herself or her child turning out bipolar. Meanwhile, Carter and Chen are both shot down in their bids for chief resident, after which she tells Weaver she is a victim of discrimination. Weaver meets Legaspi's new girlfriend. Carla hits on Benton and freaks out at Cleo after she turns her back on Reese for a second and he injures himself. Greene treats a young abused boy with an extremely irate father. Most of the ER staff play in a softball game after work.
157	22	"Rampage"	Jonathan Kaplan	Story by : Jack Orman & Joe Sachs; Teleplay by : Jack Orman	May 17, 2001	226272	30.72
Derek Fossen, the father of the abused boy that Greene treated the previous episode, goes on a shooting rampage throughout the city, looking for anyone connected with the placing of his son in a foster care facility. Greene fears for Corday and baby Ella's safety when Corday does not answer her pager. Chen moves one step closer to the chief resident position. Romano fires Legaspi for not answering his calls. Weaver confronts Romano, and comes out to him, threatening that she will quit if Kim is not rehired. Carla's husband, Roger, accuses Benton of sleeping with Carla. Cleo cuts her hand while treating an HIV-positive patient. Kovač draws unhappiness from Abby when he sends in her med school reapplication without her consent. Carter expresses his feelings to Abby and begins thinking about his future at another hospital. Fossen's homicidal rampage ends after he has killed nine people and wounded over a dozen others, when a shooting victim at a park uses his gun and shoots Fossen in the chest and arms, leaving him wounded. When Mark is taking Fossen up to the OR, the gunman goes in to ventricular tachycardia, and Mark responds by taking the defibrillator paddles and shocking into the air as Fossen watches in shock and then horror as he dies.
