= Amelia Rose =

American film and television actress (born 1986)

Amelia Rose Baldwin
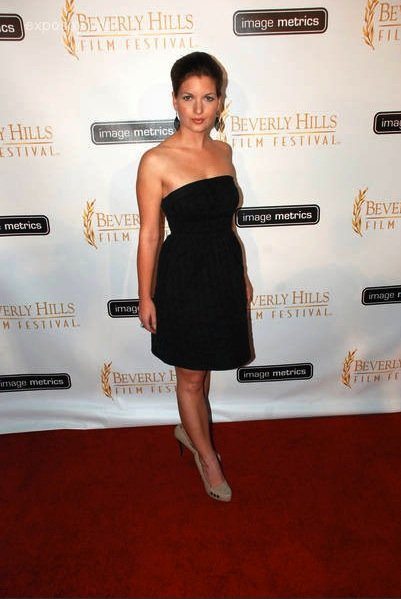
- Born: Amelia Rose Baldwin; August 1, 1986 (age 39); Austin, Texas, U.S.
- Occupation: Actress
- Years active: 2009–present

Amelia Rose Baldwin (born August 1, 1986) is an American film and television actress, well known for her portrayal of southern sweetheart Sarah-Sue in the Cannes Film Festival film "FSNF". She has also guest starred on Hawaii Five-0, Grimm, Criminal Minds, Sullivan & Son, Zach Stone Is Gonna Be Famous, CSI: NY and others.

== Early life ==
Rose was born Amelia Rose Baldwin in Austin, Texas. Rose graduated Valedictorian of her high school class, while simultaneously receiving her associate degree and a 4-year full paid scholarship to college. She then moved to study Mathematics and Theatre in Denver, Colorado. While in school, Rose participated in an abundance of theatre as well as commercials and independent films. She was discovered by a former NBC Network Casting Director turned agent and subsequently moved to Los Angeles, California.

Baldwin Rose is a verified member of Mensa International.

== Career ==
She has guest starred on the hit show Hawaii Five-0, as well as Grimm, Criminal Minds, Sullivan & Son, and CSI: NY. She most notably starred opposite Gary Busey in the film Freaky Saturday Night Fever, which has been recognized at the Cannes Film Festival, New York International Independent Film and Video Festival, Philadelphia Film Festival, Beverly Hills Film Festival. On October 27, 2012, Rose's most recent Lifetime film Stalked at 17 aired. Rose screen-tested for multiple television pilots across major studios. In interviews, Rose has stated that she paused her acting career to start a family. Rose is represented by Hervey/Grimes Talent Agency and managed by Torque Entertainment. Rose has been featured in many commercials and print ads.

== Theatre ==
Rose was featured in the Los Angeles Times for her theatre production WAR BRIDE, for which she received the Scenie award for Outstanding Performance by a Supporting Actress in a Drama from Stage Scene LA.

== Filmography ==
=== Films ===
Year	Title	Role	Notes
2012	Dr. Gutman's Eulogy	Jessica	
2012	One More Round	Emma	Ambush Entertainment
2012	Girl on the Edge	Sammy	Lifetime
2011	American Trash	Jane Kensington	
2011	The Interview	Ms. Parker	
2010	Subprime	Gang Girl	
2010	Love Naturally	Sara Sue	
2010	The Moving Picture	Daughter	Independent film
2010	Grace Bedell	Victorian Woman	
2010	Freaky Saturday Night Fever	Sarah-Sue	Cannes 2011
2010	The Man From Jalisco	Kate Tucker	
2009	Tangerine Sky	Diedre	Independent film

=== Television ===
Year	Title	Role	Notes
2013	Grimm	Olivia Sutton	
2013	Hawaii Five-0	Bride-to-Be	
2012	Stalked at 17	Sammy the Tour Guide	
2012	Sullivan & Son	Attractive Woman	
2012	Zach Stone Is Gonna Be Famous	Twenty-Something	
2011	Take 180	Britney	Electric Spoofaloo
2011	Blood Lies	News Anchor	
2011	Workshop	Female TV Host	
2010	Criminal Minds	Taylor Conwright	
2009	My Real Life	Jogger	
