= Road Kill (1999 film) =

- Directed by: Matthew Leutwyler
- Written by: Matthew Leutwyler
- Starring: Jennifer Rubin; Erik Palladino; Billy Jayne
- Cinematography: Steve Gainer
- Edited by: Matthew Leutwyler
- Release date: 1999
- Running time: 89 minutes
- Country: United States
- Language: English

Road Kill is a 1999 American low-budget black comedy film directed by Matthew Leutwyler and starring Jennifer Rubin and Erik Palladino. It won two awards in 1999, including the Audience Award for Best Film at the Santa Barbara International Film Festival.

== Cast ==
- Jennifer Rubin as Blue
- Erik Palladino as Alex
- Billy Jayne as Lars
- Anthony John Denison as "Mr. Z"
- Richard Portnow as Charbonneau
- Catherine Dyer as Sara
- Jon Polito as "Jelly"
- Chris Codol as Jordy
- Matthew Brannan as Ronnie
- Amanda Foreman as Shayla
- Jeffrey Dean Morgan as Bobby
- Jason MacDonald as Frank

== Production ==
Filming locations for Road Kill included Los Angeles, Bakersfield, California, and Palm Springs, California.
