= Dead & Breakfast =

- Directed by: Matthew Leutwyler
- Screenplay by: Matthew Leutwyler
- Story by: Matthew Leutwyler; Jun Tan; Billy Burke
- Produced by: Jun Tan; EJ Heiser
- Starring: Ever Carradine; Gina Philips; Erik Palladino; Bianca Lawson; Jeremy Sisto; Oz Perkins
- Cinematography: David Scardina
- Edited by: Peter Devaney Flanagan
- Music by: Zach Selwyn; Brian Vander Ark
- Distributed by: Anchor Bay Entertainment (United States); VMI Worldwide (International)
- Release dates: March 2004 (SXSW); August 19, 2005
- Running time: 88 minutes
- Country: United States
- Language: English
- Budget: $500,000

Dead & Breakfast is a 2004 musical zombie comedy film directed by Matthew Leutwyler starring Ever Carradine, Gina Philips, Erik Palladino, Bianca Lawson, Jeremy Sisto and Oz Perkins. The film premiered at the South by Southwest Film Festival and went on to win over a dozen awards. It was also nominated for a Saturn Award.

== Plot ==
Six friends, Christian, David, Kate, Johnny, Sara, and Melody, are traveling in an RV to get to the wedding of their friend, Kelly, in Galveston, Texas. However they become lost in a small town called Lovelock, and decide to spend the night at the local bed and breakfast, owned by the creepy Mr. Wise. While staying, the group insult the chef, Henri, causing an argument to break out. After everyone goes to bed, David goes to the kitchen to get a snack, only to discover Henri brutally murdered, before Mr. Wise has a heart attack.

With the phone line broken, it takes until morning for the sheriff, and his deputy, Enus, to be summoned for help. The sheriff is quick to suspect the group, and takes the keys to the RV away, so they can not leave the town until the investigation is over. The group goes into town, while the sheriff arrests a mysterious drifter, who quickly becomes the prime suspect. The drifter warns Christian and Sara of ancient exotic wooden box, that Sara realizes belongs to Mr. Wise. However it is too late, as Johnny arrives back at the bed and breakfast and opens the box, unleashing the "Kuman Thong" which possesses him, causing him to savagely murder various people. Meanwhile, Christian and Sara meet town local Lisa Belmont who swears she saw Mr. Wise dig up the body of his dead son and perform a form of black magic on the body. Sara and Christian return to the bed and breakfast and discover Johnny has opened the box.

Sara and Christian alert the sheriff, who drives them to a local party, that David, Kate and Melody are attending with the rest of the town folk. The possessed Johnny arrives and a bloody massacre ensues, with the town folk, including Enus, becoming zombies as Johnny puts various body parts of his victims in the box. In the chaos, Christian is decapitated as David, Kate, Sara and Melody escape with the sheriff in a truck. They accidentally run over the drifter, knocking him unconscious after he escapes from his prison cell. Taking him with them, the radiator soon blows in the truck, forcing the group to take shelter in the bed and breakfast. They gather weapons, before the drifter tells them they must retrieve the body of Mr. Wise to kill Johnny. The zombies arrive at the bed and breakfast and the group fend them off, before the sheriff, Melody and the drifter sneak out the back door to retrieve the bones of Mr. Wise.

At the bed and breakfast, the zombies retrieve some of David's blood that was on the step of the house, placing it in the box causing him to become possessed. David beats Kate to death with a metal pole, before attacking Sara. However Sara manages to kill David with a chainsaw. At the cemetery, the sheriff, Melody and the drifter retrieve the body of Mr. Wise and perform a black magic spell, taking the bones from the body. As they travel to the bed and breakfast they encounter a group of zombies. The sheriff has his neck snapped, killing him, before Lisa arrives and rescues the drifter and Melody, who continue on to the bed and breakfast. Meanwhile, at the bed and breakfast, the zombies break in. Sara fights them, but is soon cornered. The drifter, and Melody arrive outside, where Melody shoots Johnny through the heart with a bone from the body of Mr. Wise, killing him and the other zombies. Sara reunites with Melody and the drifter, and together they leave Lovelock in their RV

== Cast ==
- Ever Carradine as Sara
- Brent David Fraser as The Drifter
- Bianca Lawson as Kate
- Jeffrey Dean Morgan as The Sheriff
- Erik Palladino as David
- Oz Perkins as Johnny
- Gina Philips as Melody
- Jeremy Sisto as Christian
- Miranda Bailey as Lisa Belmont
- David Carradine as Mr Wise
- Diedrich Bader as Chef Henri
- Devon Gummersall as Orange Cap
- Mark Kelly as Enus
- Vincent Ventresca as The Doc
- Padraic Aubrey as The Mullet Man
- Luiggi Debiasse as The Gardener
- Zach Selwyn as Randall Keith Randall
- Portia de Rossi as Kelly the Bride
- Evan Helmuth as The Bass Player

== Release ==
Dead & Breakfast debuted in March 2004 at the SXSW Film Festival and opened in other film festivals on the dates given below.

Region	Release date	Festival
United States	March 2004	SXSW Film Festival
United Kingdom	April 26, 2004	Dead by Dawn Edinburgh Horror Film Festival
United States	July 10, 2004	Maine International Film Festival
Canada	July 12, 2004	Fantasia Festival
Germany	August 12, 2004	Hamburg Fantasy Filmfest
Germany	September 11, 2004	Filmfest Oldenburg
United States	September 12, 2004	Boston Film Festival
United States	September 24, 2004	Sidewalk Moving Picture Festival
Canada	September 25, 2004	Calgary Film Festival
Belgium	October 8, 2004	Flanders International Film Festival
United States	October 15, 2004	Hollywood Film Festival
Belgium	March 18, 2005	Brussels International Festival of Fantasy Films
France	January 26, 2006	Gerardmer Film Festival

== Reception ==
Rotten Tomatoes, a review aggregator, reports that 50% of 18 surveyed critics gave the film a positive rating; the average rating is 5.75/10. Metacritic rated it 34/100 based on seven reviews. Dennis Harvey of Variety compared it negatively to The Evil Dead and Braindead, which he said had more wit mixed in with their splatter. In a negative review, Anita Gates of The New York Times wrote, "Clearly Mr. Leutwyler was going for parody, but the film doesn't even come close." Time Out New York wrote that the film is comparable but not quite equal to Shaun of the Dead. Michael Atkinson of The Village Voice wrote, "The blood is raspberry syrup, the gags gag, and the film virtually falls over itself informing us how lame it is." Maitland McDonagh of TV Guide rated it 2/4 stars and called it "a goofball gore picture with aspirations to cult status" that is "extremely uneven". Nathan Rabin of The A.V. Club wrote, "Writer-director Matthew Leutwyler keeps tongue planted firmly in cheek throughout, but the film's attempts at humor mostly sputter." Eric Campos of Film Threat rated it 3.5/5 stars and wrote that the "goofball comedy" and "stellar gore" are reminiscent of Peter Jackson's early films. Joshua Siebalt of Dread Central rated it 3.5/5 stars and said that it would become a cult film among horror fans that understand it.

Reviewing the film on DVD, Steve Barton, also of Dread Central, rated it 4/5 stars and wrote, "It's clever, witty, and ultra-violent; I couldn't be more pleased." Beyond Hollywood wrote: "It's a very, very silly movie that just happens to also be insanely funny and creative." Mike Snoonian of Brutal as Hell wrote that although it is not as funny as Shaun of the Dead, it is still underrated. Mac McEntire of DVD Verdict wrote, "Dead and Breakfast is why we love low budget horror movies." Bruce G. Hallenbeck razed the film in his book Comedy-Horror Films: A Chronological History, 1914-2008, citing the numerous unamusing references to other genre films, annoying characters, routine zombie attacks, rural stereotyping, and lack of genuine wit. He concluded, "Leutwyler doesn't understand the genre well enough to effectively satirize it."

=== Awards ===
Ceremony	Year	Result	Award	Category/Recipient(s)
Shriekfest	2004	Won	Best Film	Horror Feature; Matthew Leutwyler
Rhode Island International Horror Film Festival	2004	Won	Best Feature	Matthew Leutwyler
San Francisco Horrorfest	2004	Won	Audience Award	Best Feature Film; Matthew Leutwyler
Weekend of Fear, Nuremberg, Germany	2004	Won	Audience Award	Matthew Leutwyler; Tied with Una de zombis
Weekend of Fear, Nuremberg, Germany	2004	Won	Golden Glibb	Matthew Leutwyler
Academy of Science Fiction, Fantasy & Horror Films, USA	2006	Nominated	Saturn Award	Best DVD Release
