= Hear Me (song) =

Single by Imagine Dragons

from the album Night Visions, the EP Hell and Silence and Continued Silence
- Released: November 24, 2012
- Recorded: 2010
- Studio: Battle Born Studios (Paradise, Nevada)
- Genre: Pop
- Length: 3:55
- Label: Interscope
- Songwriters: Ben McKee; Dan Reynolds; Daniel Wayne Sermon
- Producers: Alex da Kid; Imagine Dragons

Imagine Dragons singles chronology
"Radioactive" (2012)	"Hear Me" (2012)	"Demons" (2013)

Audio
- "Hear Me" on YouTube

"Hear Me" is a song by American rock band Imagine Dragons, originally written and recorded for their second extended play, Hell and Silence (2010). It appears as the third track on the EP. The song was re-recorded and mastered for their debut studio album, Night Visions (2012), on which it appears as the seventh track.

The song was released as the lead single from Night Visions in the United Kingdom and Ireland on November 24, 2012, since the multi-selling platinum single, "It's Time", was not released there until August 2013. The song debuted at number 37 on the UK Singles Chart.

The cover art for the single comes from their earlier EP Continued Silence.

== Live performances ==
"Hear Me" was first played live on March 6, 2010. During the "Fall 2012 Tour", "Hear Me" would occasionally be played toward the beginning of the set. "Hear Me" was first performed live on PBS' Vegas In Tune, broadcast in early 2012. The song has so far been performed on every date of their "Europe Tour 2012", appearing in the middle of the setlist, after "Cha-Ching (Till We Grow Older)" or "Round and Round".

== Usage in media ==
"Hear Me" is featured on the soundtrack to the 2011 feature film, Answers to Nothing. It is also occasionally used on MTV's reality show, The Real World: Las Vegas.

== Music video ==
Fans on Instagram contributed to the lyric video.

No music video was produced for "Hear Me", although a lyric video was uploaded by the band to YouTube on November 12, 2012. The video features pictures uploaded and submitted by followers of the band on the online photo-sharing, video-sharing and social networking service Instagram, where fans would feature lyrics from "Hear Me" in their pictures, whether the lyrics were transcribed metaphorically, literally or simply written. The video was the second video to be co-produced by fans, with the music video for "Tokyo", a song off their 2011 extended play It's Time being the first, featuring fans dancing along to the song.

The lyric video also featured simple fan pictures, such as selfies and pictures of the band taken at various concerts. The idea of a video taking place at an Imagine Dragons concert later inspired and was implemented in the music video for "Demons". Over 300 different Instagram photos from users were featured in the video.

== Track listing ==
CD
No.	Title	Length
1.	"Hear Me"	3:55
2.	"Round and Round"	3:17

Stream
No.	Title	Length
1.	"Hear Me"	3:55
2.	"Radioactive"	3:07

== Charts ==
Weekly chart performance for "Hear Me"
Chart (2012)	Peak position
UK Singles (Official Charts Company)	37

== Certifications ==
Certifications and sales for "Hear Me"
Region	Certification	Certified units/sales
United States (RIAA)	Gold	500,000^{‡}
^{‡} Sales+streaming figures based on certification alone.

== Release history ==
Release dates for "Hear Me"
Country	Date	Format	Label
Ireland	November 24, 2012	CD	Interscope Records
United Kingdom	November 24, 2012	CD	Interscope Records
Australia	December 6, 2012	Streamed audio	Interscope Records; KIDinaKORNER
United Kingdom	December 6, 2012	Streamed audio	Interscope Records; KIDinaKORNER
United States	December 6, 2012	Streamed audio	Interscope Records; KIDinaKORNER
