= Hangman (2015 film) =

- Official poster
- Directed by: Adam Mason
- Written by: Simon Boyes; Adam Mason
- Produced by: Simon Boyes; Mary Church; Adam Mason; Jeremy Sisto
- Starring: Jeremy Sisto; Kate Ashfield; Ryan Simpkins; Ty Simpkins
- Cinematography: Tobias Deml
- Edited by: Adam Mason; Jeremy Sisto
- Music by: Antoni Maiovvi
- Production company: Hiding in the Attic
- Distributed by: Alchemy
- Release dates: 14 March 2015 (SXSW); 9 February 2016 (United States)
- Running time: 85 minutes
- Country: United Kingdom
- Language: English

Hangman is a 2015 British thriller film, directed by Adam Mason, and co-written by Mason and Simon Boyes. The film stars Jeremy Sisto, Kate Ashfield, Ryan Simpkins, Ty Simpkins, Eric Michael Cole, and Amy Smart. The film had its world premiere at SXSW on 14 March 2015. The film was released on video on demand and home media formats on 9 February 2016 by Alchemy.

== Plot ==
A woman calls 911 to report an intruder in her home. Having already hanged the man of the house with a noose, serial killer Hangman instructs the woman to say she loves him before violently stabbing her.

Hangman secretly records Aaron Miller, his wife Beth, their daughter Marley, and young son Max as they embark on vacation at the Burbank airport. Once they leave, Hangman breaks into the Miller family's minivan and uses the vehicle's GPS to drive back to their house. There, Hangman watches their home movies, installs hidden cameras, establishes a surveillance suite in the attic, and begins secretly living inside the Miller home.

The Millers return home to find their house ransacked. Aaron also discovers a hangman drawn in ketchup on the shower tiles as well as a mannequin torso hanging from a rope in the attic.

As the Millers put the house back together and resume their regular lives, Hangman continues living there in secret while regularly stalking the family members as they sleep. Hangman also secretly follows Beth and Marley when they go out in public. Beth starts hearing noises and seeing clues around the house suggesting that someone might still be there as Hangman deliberately moves and manipulates items to keep the family suspicious and unsettled.

While alone in the house to fix the toilet, handyman Miguel finds one of Hangman's cameras embedded in the bathroom wall. Hangman surprises Miguel from behind and suffocates him with a plastic bag.

Hangman scares Beth with a popped light bulb to stop her from investigating the attic after she hears another strange sound. Beth suggests purchasing a gun to feel safe and Aaron agrees.

Marley notices Hangman recording her while she makes out with her boyfriend Miles at a Lovers’ Lane. Miles confronts Hangman, but the teenage couple drives away when they become creeped out by his unresponsiveness.

Aaron and Beth host dinner for Beth's friend Melissa and Melissa's husband. While the quartet dines, Hangman goes through Melissa's purse. Max is woken by banging on the roof. Beth notices that someone urinated on the floor in the upstairs hallway and assumes it was Max.

Hangman steals the report card Marley was hiding from her parents and puts it on Aaron and Beth's bed. Marley blames Max for giving the report card to their parents.

While cleaning Max's bedroom, Beth finds a drawing of a faceless man dressed in black. Max explains that the figure is Jimmy, a man who sometimes visits him in his dreams. Max also claims that Jimmy told him Melissa is not the good person that she seems to be.

Hangman masturbates and cries to himself while watching Aaron and Beth have sex. Hangman drugs a bottle of wine and does something unseen to Beth while she is unconscious.

Hangman has an emotional breakdown while perusing a Miller family photo album. He later puts lipstick on one of Aaron's shirts and also places a condom in the pocket to present an appearance of infidelity.

Hangman follows Marley and Miles to the carousel at Griffith Park and murders Miles in the bathroom. He then sends Marley a text from Miles’ phone to make it look like the boy stormed off in anger.

Beth discovers that she is pregnant. After Beth finds the shirt Hangman tampered with, Max tells his mother that Jimmy saw Aaron kissing Melissa.

Beth confronts Aaron over his presumed affair when Aaron comes home. Their argument is interrupted by noises upstairs. Aaron grabs the gun when he realizes that there is an intruder in their home. He investigates the attic, but Hangman kills Aaron and drops his body from a noose. Holding Beth at gunpoint, Hangman assumes Aaron's identity and instructs Beth to say she loves him. After Beth says, “I love you,” Hangman shoots her in the head.

Hangman returns to the airport with his video camera and begins stalking another family as they leave for vacation.

== Cast ==
- Jeremy Sisto as Aaron Miller
- Kate Ashfield as Beth Miller
- Ryan Simpkins as Marley Miller
- Ty Simpkins as Max Miller
- Eric Michael Cole as Hangman
- Amy Smart as Melissa
- Ross Partridge

== Production ==
Sisto and Mason had worked together previously on music videos. Sisto was excited when Mason contacted him to see if he was interested in collaborating on a feature film, as it was the first time Sisto had produced a film.

== Release ==
Hangman was selected for the 2015 South by Southwest Film Festival. It premiered there on 14 March 2015. In September 2015, it was announced Alchemy had acquired distribution rights to the film. The film was released on 9 February 2016 through video on demand and home media formats.

== Soundtrack ==
Antoni Maiovvi's soundtrack was released digitally and on vinyl via Giallo Disco Records in 2016.

== Reception ==
The film received mixed reviews from film critics. Frank Scheck of The Hollywood Reporter wrote: "Unfortunately, despite its provocative premise, the film, which recently received its world premiere at SXSW, offers only sporadic moments of creepiness." Dennis Harvey of Variety wrote: "An effectively creepy spin on found-footage horror, Hangman finds a family unwittingly playing host to a malevolent intruder who's broken into their home – and stayed there, unseen, while watching their every move on surveillance cameras he's installed." Patrick Cooper of Bloody Disgusting rated it 2/5 stars and wrote, "Hangman looks better than most found footage films. But the lack of characters to attach ourselves to, the drab killer, and the predictability really hamper what could've been an interesting little film." Dominick Suzanne-Mayer of Consequence of Sound rated it C and wrote that "you've seen this movie before, and you've absolutely seen better iterations".

== See also ==
- List of films featuring home invasions
