= The Oh in Ohio =

2006 film by Billy Kent

- Promotional movie poster
- Directed by: Billy Kent
- Screenplay by: Adam Wierzbianski
- Story by: Billy Kent; Sarah Bird; Adam Wierzbianski
- Produced by: Matthew Leutwyler; Debra Grieco; Jun Tan
- Starring: Parker Posey; Paul Rudd; Danny DeVito; Mischa Barton; Chandra Wilson; Keith David; Liza Minnelli; Heather Graham
- Cinematography: Ramsey Nickell
- Edited by: Paul Bertino; Michael R. Miller
- Music by: Bruno Coon; Michael Muhlfriedel
- Distributed by: Cyan Pictures
- Release date: July 14, 2006 (limited)
- Running time: 88 minutes
- Country: United States
- Language: English
- Budget: $5 million
- Box office: $648,183

The Oh in Ohio is a 2006 American comedy film directed by Billy Kent and starring Parker Posey, Paul Rudd, Mischa Barton and Danny DeVito. The picture was screened at several US film festivals from March to May 2006 and was released theatrically by Cyan Pictures on July 14, 2006. Set in Cleveland, much of the film was shot on location at well-known Cleveland area landmarks such as Coventry Village and Case Western Reserve University.

== Plot ==
Frustrated with the fact that he cannot give his wife Priscilla (Parker Posey) an orgasm, Jack (Paul Rudd) moves out of the house and starts a relationship with Kristen (Mischa Barton), his student. Unfulfilled, Priscilla forms an unlikely partnership with Wayne (Danny DeVito), a businessman more than twice her age.

== Cast ==
- Parker Posey as Priscilla Chase
- Paul Rudd as Jack Chase
- Danny DeVito as Wayne the Pool Guy
- Mischa Barton as Kristen Taylor
- Chandra Wilson as Sherri
- Keith David as Coach Popovich
- Liza Minnelli as Alyssa Donahue
- Heather Graham as Justine
- Tim Russ as Douglas
- Adam Nelson as Kid at Vending Machine

== Reception ==
The film was a commercial failure, earning $648,183 on a $5 million budget at the box office. On Rotten Tomatoes, it has a 23% approval rating based on 70 reviews, with an average score of 4.7/10 and the website's consensus reads, "A muddled sex-comedy that feels oddly sexless, The Oh in Ohio packs in too many ideas without establishing a clear identity or objective." Dan Callahan of Slant gave the film 0 stars out of 4, calling it an "implausible, weirdly depressed comedy", adding "there isn't one laugh in it". Entertainment Weekly was more favorable, giving the film a 'B−', with Owen Gleiberman describing it as "a silly, amusing trifle". And Joe Leydon of Variety praised it in his upbeat review as an "amusing indie comedy [that] blithely blurs the line between risqué and raunchy, often to hilarious effect."

== See also ==
- List of Ambush Entertainment Films
