= Population 436 =

- Directed by: Michelle MacLaren
- Written by: Michael Kingston
- Produced by: Gavin Polone
- Starring: Jeremy Sisto; Fred Durst; Charlotte Sullivan; Peter Outerbridge; R.H. Thomson; David Fox; Monica Parker
- Cinematography: Thomas Burstyn
- Edited by: Gabriel Wrye
- Music by: Glenn Buhr
- Production companies: Destination Films; Pariah
- Distributed by: Sony Pictures Home Entertainment
- Release date: September 5, 2006
- Running time: 92 minutes
- Countries: Canada; United States
- Language: English

Population 436 is a 2006 mystery-horror film directed by Michelle MacLaren and starring Jeremy Sisto, Fred Durst, Peter Outerbridge and Charlotte Sullivan. Despite the credited location of the film as Steinbach Manitoba, The film was filmed on location in Austin, Manitoba, including scenes shot at the historic Manitoba Agricultural Museum village. The museums buildings such as the Muir House and the Arizona Church are frequently seen during the film. The film was released direct-to-video.

== Plot ==
Steve Kady, a US Census Bureau enumerator, is sent to the remote and seemingly idyllic village of Rockwell Falls, North Dakota, to interview residents concerning the population. On the way to Rockwell Falls, he is distracted by a woman falling off a horse and his vehicle hits a pothole and bursts two tires. He is eventually picked up by Bobby Caine, the Sheriff's Deputy, who drives him into Rockwell Falls and helps him find a place to stay.

During his stay, Kady notices a number of disturbing things about the town, including its people acting strangely. He begins to have eerie dreams. There is also talk of the "fever" from townsfolk, several of whom treat him as though he was not just a visitor, but a permanent new resident. His research reveals that the town's population has remained at exactly 436 for over 100 years. People who try to leave Rockwell Falls seem to meet with bizarre and deadly accidents or just vanish, which the residents believe to be the work of God.

Kady becomes romantically involved with Courtney Lovett, a local woman and the daughter of his host, much to the chagrin of Caine, who is also in love with her. He also befriends Amanda, a young girl whose father was killed trying to escape from the town, and who is being held at the clinic of Dr. Greaver, the town physician, on the pretext of treating her for schizophrenia. Courtney and Amanda both express a desire to leave the town but are afraid of the consequences of trying.

After stumbling upon some books on biblical numerology, Kady realizes that the townspeople attach mystical importance to the number 436 and are willing to go to extreme lengths to keep the population at that number. Anyone who expresses a desire to leave is treated for the "fever" by Dr. Greaver with electroshock therapy. It gradually becomes apparent to Kady that the residents of Rockwell Falls have no intention of allowing him to leave.

After witnessing the execution of a seemingly willing woman at a town feast, Kady becomes hysterical and is taken to the clinic to be treated for the "fever". He escapes from his host and finds a sympathetic resident who came to the town eight years earlier and was once in the same predicament. He helps Kady plan his escape. After setting fire to the town garage as a diversion, Kady rescues Amanda from the clinic but is forced to leave Courtney behind after discovering that she has been lobotomized by Dr. Greaver. As Kady and Amanda flee the town in a stolen tow truck, a storm is brewing with dark clouds and lightning strikes. Kady then realizes that the cross hanging from the truck's rearview mirror and a doll on its dashboard both appeared in his dreams. The pair then hit a semi head-on, dying immediately after leaving town.

The film ends with Frank, one of Kady's co-workers who has come in search of him, being picked up by the sheriff after his car hits the same pothole that Kady's had, blowing his tires in an echo of the beginning of the film.

== Cast ==
- Jeremy Sisto as Steve Kady
- Fred Durst as Deputy Bobby Caine
- Charlotte Sullivan as Courtney Lovett
- Peter Outerbridge as Deputy Christian Hecker
- R.H. Thomson as Sheriff Jim Calcutt
- David Fox as Dr. Harold James Greaver
- Monica Parker as Belma Lovett
- Frank Adamson as Mayor Gus Grateman
- Marina Stephenson Kerr as Ruby Flynn
- Reva Timbers as Amanda Jacobs

== Reception ==
Dread Central gave it 3 out of 5 and wrote: "File this one under fun while it lasts, but easily forgettable."
