= Night Vision (disambiguation) =

Night vision is the ability to see in a dark environment.

Night Vision may also refer to:

- Night Vision (Bruce Cockburn album), 1973
- Night Vision (Kayak album), 2001
- "Nightvision", a song by Daft Punk from Discovery
- "Night Vision", a song by Ian Chan, 2023
- "Night Vision", a song by Suzanne Vega from Solitude Standing
- "Night Vision", a song by Electric Six from Switzerland
- "Night Vision", a 2014 novel by Ella West, shortlisted for the Hampshire Book Awards
- "Nightvision", a 2002 public information film about fire safety made by Fire Kills for HM Government

== See also ==
- Night Visions (disambiguation)
- Scotopic vision
