= The Movie Hero =

- Directed by: Brad T. Gottfred
- Written by: Brad T. Gottfred
- Produced by: Richard Middleton; Alexander Sulaimani
- Starring: Jeremy Sisto; Dina Meyer; Peter Stormare; Brian J. White
- Cinematography: Samuel Ameen; Joseph Labisi
- Edited by: Ryan Rothmaier
- Music by: Steven Thomas Cavit
- Distributed by: Elevation Properties
- Release date: 2003
- Running time: 98 minutes
- Country: United States
- Language: English

The Movie Hero is a 2003 American romantic comedy film starring Jeremy Sisto, Dina Meyer, and Peter Stormare. It was written and directed by Brad T. Gottfred.

== Plot ==
The concept of the film is that the protagonist is aware his life is a movie. He meets many people throughout his "storyline" including his audience, whom he talks to frequently, his sidekick, a woman he immediately calls his Love Interest, and a shady character known only as Suspicious Character whom he suspects to be villainous. The movie won Best Feature at the Tambay Video and Film Festival as well as numerous awards from festivals around the country. It premiered on DVD and the Showtime Cable channel in 2006.
