= Uncanny (film) =

- Film poster
- Directed by: Matthew Leutwyler
- Written by: Shahin Chandrasoma
- Produced by: Sim Sarna; Nora Bafus
- Starring: Mark Webber; Lucy Griffiths; David Clayton Rogers; Rainn Wilson
- Cinematography: Ross Richardson
- Edited by: Matthew Leutwyler
- Music by: Craig Richey
- Production company: Accelerated Matter
- Distributed by: RLJ Entertainment
- Release dates: January 31, 2015 (SBIFF); January 31, 2015 (United States)
- Running time: 85 minutes
- Country: United States
- Language: English

Uncanny is a 2015 American science fiction film directed by Matthew Leutwyler and based on a screenplay by Shahin Chandrasoma. It is about the world's first "perfect" artificial intelligence (David Clayton Rogers) that begins to exhibit startling and unnerving emergent behavior when a reporter (Lucy Griffiths) begins a relationship with the scientist (Mark Webber) who created it.

== Plot ==
David Kressen, a child prodigy, graduated MIT a decade ago at age 19, after receiving multiple degrees in mechanical and computer engineering. Since then, he has not been seen. On the day of his graduation, he was approached by Simon Castle, billionaire CEO and founder of Kestrel Computing. Castle made him an offer impossible to refuse. David went to Workspace 18, part of a program of intellectual angel investments that Castle makes to genius-level individuals to further the high level science they practice. For the last ten years, David has been working tirelessly in Workspace 18, perfecting his ultimate creation: Adam, an artificial intelligence that is indistinguishable from an actual human being.

Joy Andrews is a reporter brought in for a week of exclusive access to do a series of interviews about Adam and his creator. She initially regards the robot with curiosity but as their interactions build, Adam seems to respond to her presence. David, who she initially thought of as arrogant, emerges as naive, hiding behind a formidable existence. As their friendship develops and grows into something more, Adam begins exhibiting peculiar emergent behavior impossible to program.

== Cast ==
- Mark Webber as David Kressen
- Lucy Griffiths as Joy Andrews
- David Clayton Rogers as Adam Kressen
- Rainn Wilson as Simon Castle

== Release ==
Uncanny premiered at the Santa Barbara International Film Festival and made its international premiere at the 2015 Edinburgh International Film Festival.

== Reception ==
Ain't It Cool News called it "a rare breed of thoughtful, independent science fiction". Sight & Sound magazine wrote, "Confident, meticulously crafted... written with sharp brilliance and performed with perfect nuance." Justin Lowe of The Hollywood Reporter wrote that the script "remains too simplistic to become fully involving".
