= Unearthed (film) =

- Directed by: Matthew Leutwyler
- Written by: Matthew Leutwyler
- Produced by: TyRuben Ellingson; Miranda Bailey; D.J. Marini
- Starring: Emmanuelle Vaugier; Luke Goss
- Cinematography: Ross Richardson
- Edited by: Shawna Callahan
- Music by: Joseph Bishara
- Distributed by: After Dark Films
- Release date: November 9, 2007
- Running time: 93 minutes (U.S.); 90 minutes (Europe)
- Country: United States
- Language: English

Unearthed is a 2007 American horror film directed by Matthew Leutwyler and starring Emmanuelle Vaugier and Luke Goss. It opened on November 9, 2007 as one of the "8 Films to Die For" in the After Dark Films Horrorfest.

== Plot ==
After a sinister crash on the highway in a small New Mexican town, people start disappearing, and animals begin dying. The cause of the crash is later revealed to be a 900-year-old creature which was unearthed during an archaeological dig in the area.

Meanwhile, a gas station owner informs a group of people that the gas tank never arrived, so the small group needs to spend the night at the gas station. Sheriff Annie is called to investigate the crash and finds a strange piece of evidence.

Annie then takes it to the gas station, where Nodin investigates it. It is clearly not human and contains many elements of DNA. It is later explained that the creature is an alien weapon, devised by an extremely ancient civilization to collect DNA, like a probe or exploration device built using biotechnology. It tends to do so in a decidedly lethal manner.

At the bar, Carla finds male customers dead in the back lot. She runs back into the bar, and the creature then breaks in. It first injures her arm (and also causes her to shoot herself in the foot), and then it eventually butchers her.

Back at the gas station, Caya and Charlie are flirting inside the motel room. Ally goes outside to throw out some garbage and encounters Grandpa, thinking Ally was a coyote rustling through the trash. Ally then returns to the motel, but before she can enter, the creature rips its claw into her torso.

Ally's dead body is thrown back into the room and onto the stove. Her dead body burns, causing a fire and a gas leak. Annie, Nodin, and Grandpa go into the room where the creature is outside, banging on the walls. Grandpa is then killed, and Nodin begins to panic.

Annie then knocks her unconscious, and they go out to the truck after the room explodes into flames.

After countless battles with the monster, most of the group is killed. At the end, Annie confronts the monster and believes she kills it by smashing it against a water tank with her car, but the monster is only knocked unconscious for a while. Annie injects herself with the poison containing uranium (the only substance that makes the poison work against the monster) that was prepared by Nodin in order to kill the monster. The monster kills Annie and dies as soon as it comes in contact with the uranium in the poison. The remaining survivors, Caya and Nodin, place Annie's body in the back of their truck. They then drive off, leaving the monster in the dirt, where it is most likely going to become buried again.

== Cast ==
- Emmanuelle Vaugier as Sheriff Annie Flynn
- Luke Goss as Kale
- Tonantzin Carmelo as Nodin
- Beau Garrett as Caya
- Charles Q. Murphy as Hank
- Tommy Dewey as Charlie
- M. C. Gainey as Rob Horn
- Miranda Bailey as Carla
- Whitney Able as Ally
- Russell Means as Grandpa
- Isait De La Fuente as Deputy Luis
- Ric Barbera as Curtis
- Chris Andrew Ciulla as Kelly
