= Answers to Nothing (film) =

- Theatrical release poster
- Directed by: Matthew Leutwyler
- Written by: Matthew Leutwyler; Gillian Vigman
- Produced by: Amanda Marshall; Sim Sarna
- Starring: Elizabeth Mitchell; Dane Cook; Julie Benz; Barbara Hershey; Kali Hawk; Zach Gilford
- Cinematography: David Robert Jones
- Edited by: Matthew Leutwyler
- Music by: Craig Richey
- Production companies: Cold Iron Pictures; Ambush Entertainment
- Distributed by: Roadside Attractions
- Release dates: September 22, 2011 (WFF); December 2, 2011
- Running time: 124 minutes
- Country: United States
- Language: English
- Budget: $1.5 million
- Box office: $22,029

Answers to Nothing is a 2011 American mystery drama film written and directed by Matthew Leutwyler. The film stars Elizabeth Mitchell, Dane Cook, Julie Benz, and Barbara Hershey as part of an ensemble cast. The story revolves around multiple characters searching for meaning in their lives in Los Angeles. Distributed by Roadside Attractions, the film premiered at the Woodstock Film Festival on September 22, 2011, and was theatrically released on December 2. Answers to Nothing garnered negative reviews from critics for lazily cribbing the template of interconnective stories and characters from similar films.

It is the last film that starred Elsa Raven before her death on November 3, 2020.

== Plot ==
Against the backdrop of a child abduction case the film follows five days in the life of a variety of people living in Los Angeles. Kate is a lawyer arguing in a custody battle on behalf of Drew, who cares for her completely disabled brother. He was an accomplished marathoner. After celebrating his top 30% finish in the San Francisco marathon, the two had drinks to celebrate, and an accident in the car ride home caused the brother's disability. Her parents want their son put in a home, but Drew's overwhelming guilt compels her to tend to her brother. She is training to run a marathon while pushing her brother in a wheelchair. After losing custody of her brother, she loses heart and drinks some whiskey the night before the race. During the race, memories of the accident overwhelm her, and she crashes her brother's wheelchair into a curb. Her fall dislocates her shoulder, but she decides to finish the race regardless of the fact that all the other runners have gone home.

Kate is struggling to conceive with her husband Ryan, who is a psychologist. Ryan is having an affair with a singer named Tara (Volkman). At the same time, he struggles to convince his mother that his father is never returning from France, after nine years away. Ryan grows increasingly conflicted over his affair, and on Tara's birthday, he is unable to climax with her. At a fertility clinic, Kate sees a romantic text message from Tara on Ryan's phone right before she goes under anesthesia. Ryan struggles to produce a sperm sample in the clinic, and he has to call Tara to climax. Finally, when Tara is playing Club Tatou in Westlake, Ryan sits in the parking lot, unsure of what to do. He drives home and calls his father in France. His father refuses to tell his mother the truth, which convinces Ryan of what to do. He goes inside to comfort Kate, who has found out that the IV treatment did not work, but she is relieved that Ryan has come home to her.

One of Ryan's patients is a young, African-American TV writer, who picks up a young man from her neighborhood, but on their first date, she confesses that she "hates black people". Ryan urges her to work through her identity issues by doing something nice to people who make her uncomfortable.

The main detective on the abduction case is a single mother and Kate's best friend. She initially suspects the young girl's neighbor, Beckworth, of taking her, but when porn is found on the father's computer, he becomes the main person of interest. The media coverage attracts the interest of Carter, a lonely school teacher who spends his free time playing EverQuest II. As the days drag on, with the girl still missing, Carter finds himself unable to stay immersed in his game, and he eventually confronts his neighbor Jerry, who everyone knows from around the neighborhood where he walks the beat in a policeman's uniform. Carter urges Jerry to confront the neighbor. When Jerry urges Carter to go back to his apartment and let the police handle it, Carter drives off determined to actually do something.

At the Beckworth's house, Carter is trying to get up the nerve to ring the doorbell when Jerry arrives and begs him to leave. Beckworth comes to the door and grows indignant as he realizes what is going on. Carter flies into a rage and attacks Beckworth. After Jerry separates them, Beckworth produces a gun and starts shooting at the intruders. Jerry manages to kill Beckworth with a fire poker but not before getting shot in the neck. As he dies, he tells Carter to flee, and he manages to flip up a rug, exposing a handle to a trap door. Carter watches the news coverage back at home, and learns that Beckworth had kept the girl alive in a soundproof room in his basement.

== Cast ==
- Elizabeth Mitchell as Kate
- Dane Cook as Ryan
- Julie Benz as Frankie
- Miranda Bailey as Drew
- Mark Kelly as Carter
- Erik Palladino as Jerry
- Greg Germann as Beckworth
- Barbara Hershey as Marilyn
- Kali Hawk as Allegra
- Zach Gilford as Evan
- Joel Michaely as Alfonso
- Aja Volkman as Tara
- Karley Scott Collins as Tina
- Sonya Eddy as Nurse

== Release ==
=== Box office ===
On August 9, 2011, Roadside Attractions garnered the film's U.S. distribution rights and planned it for a December 2 release. It made its world premiere at the 2011 Woodstock Film Festival on September 22. On its opening weekend, the film grossed $14,262 from 21 theatres, averaging $679 per theater and ranking number 54 at the box office. The film earned a total gross of $22,029 after two weeks of release, with a widest release of 21 theatres.

=== Critical reception ===
On the review aggregator website Rotten Tomatoes, 9% of 23 critics' reviews are positive, with an average rating of 3.3/10. Metacritic, which uses a weighted average, assigned the film a score of 29 out of 100, based on 14 critics, indicating "generally unfavorable" reviews.

Roger Ebert was critical of the "interlocking" tales and approach to short stories the film took from both Paul Haggis' Crash and Robert Altman's Short Cuts respectively, concluding with, "So the film, while well-made and acted, lacks the gathering power of the others that I've mentioned." Gary Goldstein of the Los Angeles Times said that despite a decent cast, he critiqued that "it can never fully surmount an overlong, largely underwhelming script that often swaps forced personality quirks and symbolic gestures for honest dimension." Dennis Harvey from Variety found the film to be "well crafted and watchable but lacks the distinctive story content, style and standout performances to become more than a serviceable reboot of familiar ideas." Newsday writer Rafer Guzman wrote about the movie overall, "[T]he performances are passable, but Leutwyler (who directed, co-wrote and edited) mixes his scenes with astounding tone-deafness, veering from fertility-clinic comedy to bloody violence to youthful romance. Moreover, the dialogue is filled with bogus sermons on random topics like kindness, faith, justice — anything you like, really."

The A.V. Club's Nathan Rabin rated the film with a D+ grade. He found Dane Cook "miscast and unconvincing" in his role, criticizing him for his use of "a dour expression and permanent frown" for his performance but said his appearance is the only thing in the movie that sets it apart from the numerous "everything-is-connected knock-offs" found in film festivals, saying "[I]t doesn't build to a climax so much as it winds down with a halfhearted shrug and a few feeble false shots of hope. (Maybe we aren't so different after all!)"

R. Kurt Osenlund of Slant Magazine heavily lambasted Leutwyler for his "amateurish delusions" of having idiosyncratic characters and misguided philosophising being taken as having depth, only for it to be "tasteless and out of touch right down to its foundation," calling the film "a shoddy urban pastiche jam-packed with the same sophomoric, faux profundity of that irksome, half-ambiguous title." Neil Genzlinger of The New York Times felt the film's overall plot connecting the vignettes came out of a "cheesy police thriller" but said that it proved satisfactory enough to warrant "some fine performances and an embrace of understatement." He also singled out Miranda Bailey's performance, saying that she "expertly conveys both the exhaustion and the loneliness of that role." Joseph Airdo of AXS praised the ensemble cast for giving "powerfully nuanced" performances, highlighting Cook's contribution for "melting away any preconceived notions one might have about his dramatic abilities" and Leutwyler for his handling of the film's multiple storylines, calling it "a spectacular – if sobering – cinematic effort."

=== Home media ===
Answers to Nothing was released on DVD on February 28, 2012.
