= Jeremy Sisto =

American actor (born 1974)

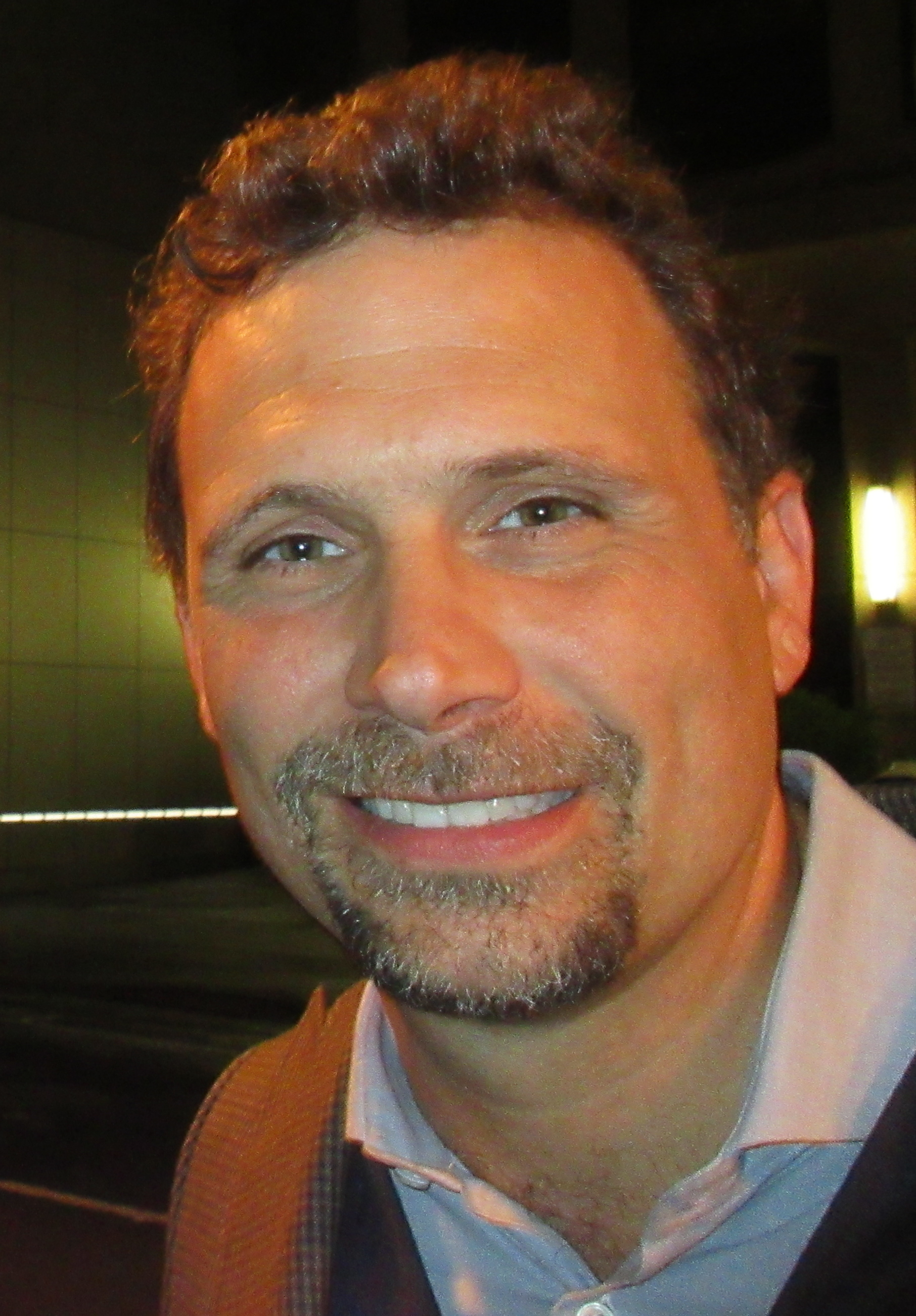
- Sisto in 2018
- Born: Jeremy Merton Sisto; October 6, 1974 (age 51); Grass Valley, California, U.S.
- Occupations: Actor; film producer
- Years active: 1991–present
- Spouses: Marisa Ryan (m. 1993; div. 2002) Addie Lane (m. 2009)
- Children: 2
- Relatives: Meadow Sisto (sister)

Jeremy Merton Sisto (born October 6, 1974) is an American actor. He is known for his roles as Billy Chenowith in HBO's Six Feet Under (2001–2005), NYPD Detective Cyrus Lupo in NBC's Law & Order (2008–2010), George Altman in the ABC sitcom Suburgatory (2011–2014), for which he was nominated for a Critics' Choice Television Award for Best Actor in a Comedy Series, and Jubal Valentine in the CBS drama series FBI (2018–present). He has appeared in such films as Clueless (1995), May (2002), Thirteen (2003), Wrong Turn (2003), Waitress (2007), and Frozen II (2019).

In 2004, he portrayed bigoted baseball player Shane Mungitt in Take Me Out, for which he was nominated for a Los Angeles Drama Critics Circle Award for Featured Performance in a Play. Sisto co-wrote the screenplay for the comedy film Break Point (2014), in which he also starred.

== Early life ==
Jeremy Sisto was born in Grass Valley, California, the son of Reedy Gibbs, an actress, and Richard "Dick" Sisto, a jazz musician and educator. Sisto has an older sister, Meadow Sisto, who is an actress mostly known for playing Caroline in the 1992 film Captain Ron. Sisto's parents divorced and his father then married fabric artist Penny Sisto. Sisto lived with his mother and sister and has said that his father's absence made parenting his own son more difficult. He was raised in the lower Sierra Nevada Mountains before moving to Chicago at age seven. While in Chicago, Sisto and his sister appeared in the final play by Tennessee Williams A House Not Meant to Stand in 1982 at the Goodman Theatre. He attended Hayfield Montessori School in Louisville, Kentucky for first grade, then Francis W. Parker School in Chicago. Sisto worked with local theater companies Cherry Street Theater and the Absolute Theater Company. He appeared in the film Grand Canyon while attending high school. Despite his lack of academic achievement in high school, Sisto was accepted into the University of California, Los Angeles (UCLA) with the stipulation that he sign a kind of non-disclosure statement to keep his acceptance quiet unless/until he became a well-known actor. However, his career took off, so he did not attend UCLA (or any other college), and he began acting full-time.

== Career ==
=== 1991–99: Beginnings and Clueless ===
Sisto made his film debut in the 1991 drama Grand Canyon, starring Kevin Kline and Steve Martin. He followed this with roles in the television films Desperate Choices: To Save My Child (1992) and The Shaggy Dog (1994). In his early film and television career, Sisto played a killer in Hideaway (1995); a rich teen in Clueless (1995); a 20-something kidnapper in Suicide Kings (1997); Olympic gold medalist long-distance runner Frank Shorter in Without Limits (1998); Jesus Christ in the CBS miniseries Jesus (1999); and a widowed filmmaker in This Space Between Us (1999). He has also starred in the films Moonlight and Valentino (1995), White Squall (1996), Bongwater (1997), Some Girl (1998), and Playing by Heart (1998). In 1996, Sisto screen tested for the character of Jack Dawson in the James Cameron film Titanic alongside Kate Winslet but ultimately lost out on the role to Leonardo DiCaprio. In 1998, he portrayed Frederick W. Seward in the TNT television film The Day Lincoln Was Shot.

=== 2000–10: Six Feet Under and Law & Order ===
From 2001 to 2005, he portrayed Billy Chenowith in the HBO drama series Six Feet Under. For that work, he was twice nominated for the Screen Actors Guild Award for Outstanding Performance by an Ensemble in a Drama Series along with his co-stars. Sisto starred in the 2001 drama film Angel Eyes, alongside Jennifer Lopez. In 2003, Sisto starred in the drama film Thirteen, the romantic comedy The Movie Hero, and the horror film Wrong Turn. That same year, he also appeared in the series finale of The WB's teen drama series Dawson's Creek. Sisto then performed on the Los Angeles stage, playing the role of bigoted Southerner Shane Mungitt in Richard Greenberg's play Take Me Out, about a baseball player who announces he is gay; Sisto was nominated for a Los Angeles Drama Critics Circle Award for his role.

In 2006, he appeared in the Broadway play Festen at the Music Box Theatre. In the same year, he starred in the short-lived NBC drama series Kidnapped, top-lined the direct-to-video mystery horror film Population 436, and starred in the crime-thriller film Unknown. In July 2007, Sisto was featured in the Maroon 5 video for the song "Wake Up Call". He played a man who was sleeping with the girlfriend of Adam Levine. That same year, he appeared as Earl Hunterson opposite Keri Russell in the comedy-drama film Waitress.

In 2008, Sisto joined the cast of the NBC crime drama series Law & Order, as Detective Cyrus Lupo, replacing Milena Govich's Detective Nina Cassady as the partner of Jesse L. Martin's Ed Green. Sisto had already appeared on the show, as a lawyer, in the previous season's finale. Sisto stayed on for the series' next three seasons, and his character became partners with Anthony Anderson's Detective Kevin Bernard after Martin left the series near the end of season 18. Also in 2008, Sisto starred in the drama film Gardens of the Night, and voiced the role of Batman in the direct-to-video film Justice League: The New Frontier. In 2009, he played a Catholic priest, alongside Kristin Chenoweth as a prostitute, in the independent drama film Into Temptation. The following year, he starred in the Manhattan Theatre Club production of Spirit Control at the New York City Center, gaining rave reviews for his performance as Adam Wyatt.

=== 2011–present: Suburgatory, screenwriting debut and FBI ===
From 2011 to 2014, Sisto starred in the ABC comedy series Suburgatory, which premiered on September 28, 2011. He played the role of George Altman, the divorced father of the series' main character, for three seasons, after which the series was cancelled. Sisto was nominated for the 2013 Critics' Choice Television Award for Best Actor in a Comedy Series for his performance as George. In 2011, he starred in the drama film Sironia, directed by Brandon Dickerson. In 2012, he starred as Sheriff Rowlings in the critically acclaimed science-fiction comedy-drama Robot & Frank. The following year, Sisto co-starred as Guy Karlsburg, alongside James Marsden and Claire Danes, in the comedy-drama As Cool as I Am.

In 2014, Sisto co-wrote the screenplay for the comedy film Break Point with Gene Hong. He also starred in the film and served as a producer. On June 5, 2014, it was announced that Sisto had joined the cast of Carlton Cuse's remake of The Returned for the cable channel A&E. The series lasted one season before it was cancelled by the network. He then voiced Talon in the animated direct-to-video film Batman vs. Robin. In 2015, Sisto produced and starred as Aaron Miller in the British thriller film Hangman, which had its premiere at South by Southwest. That same year, he joined the cast of ABC's crime drama series Wicked City. Sisto portrayed Detective Jack Roth, an LAPD officer searching for a serial killer on the Sunset Strip. The role was originally portrayed by Adam Rothenberg, but after the series was given its premiere date, the role was recast. It was poorly received by critics and was cancelled by ABC after airing only three episodes following weak ratings.

Sisto was then cast alongside Archie Panjabi in ABC's drama pilot The Jury, but the project was not picked up to series. From 2016 to 2018, Sisto starred as Freddy Green in Antoine Fuqua's Audience Network drama series Ice, opposite Cam Gigandet and Donald Sutherland. Sisto currently portrays Assistant Special Agent-in-Charge Jubal Valentine in Dick Wolf's CBS drama series FBI.

== Personal life ==
On August 30, 1993, Sisto married actress Marisa Ryan in Las Vegas; both were 18 years old at the time. Sisto and Ryan separated two days later but remained legally married until June 21, 2002, when their divorce was finalized. Sisto had dated Navi Rawat.

In 2009, Sisto and then-girlfriend Addie Lane had their first child. Sisto and Lane married on October 13, 2009, at New York City Hall. They had a second child in 2012. The family resides in Laurel Canyon, Los Angeles.

== Filmography ==
=== Film ===
| Year | Title | Role | Notes |
|---|---|---|---|
| 1991 | Grand Canyon | Roberto | |
| 1994 | The Crew | Timothy Grant | |
| 1995 | Hideaway | Jeremy "Vassago" Nyebern | |
| 1995 | Clueless | Elton Tiscia | |
| 1995 | Moonlight and Valentino | Steven | |
| 1996 | White Squall | Frank Beaumont | |
| 1997 | Bongwater | Robert | |
| 1997 | Suicide Kings | T. K. Lawrence | |
| 1997 | Three Women of Pain | Lance | Short film, also executive producer |
| 1997 | Oakland Underground | Nox Iluminata Leader | |
| 1998 | Some Girl | Chad | |
| 1998 | Without Limits | Frank Shorter | |
| 1998 | Playing by Heart | Malcolm | Uncredited |
| 1999 | This Space Between Us | Alex Harty | |
| 1999 | No Fear | Sonny James | |
| 1999 | The Bible Collection: Jesus | Jesus | Television film |
| 1999 | The Auteur Theory | Jules | "The Crap Shoot of Life" segment only |
| 1999 | Little Servant | Flamingo | |
| 2000 | Track Down | Lance Petersen | |
| 2000 | Men Named Milo, Women Named Greta | Deke Masters | Short film |
| 2001 | Don's Plum | Bernard | |
| 2001 | Angel Eyes | Larry Pogue, Sr. | |
| 2001 | Dead Dog | Tom Braeburn | |
| 2002 | May | Adam Stubbs | |
| 2002 | Showboy | Himself – Actor, Six Feet Under | |
| 2002 | Inside | Daniel | Short film |
| 2002 | Now You Know | Jeremy | |
| 2002 | Robbing 'Hef | Jackie | |
| 2003 | Thirteen | Brady | |
| 2003 | The Movie Hero | Blake Gardner | |
| 2003 | Manfast | Mica | |
| 2003 | Wrong Turn | Scott Korbee | |
| 2003 | Something More | Luke | Short film |
| 2004 | Paranoia 1.0 | Simon J. | Also co-producer |
| 2004 | In Enemy Hands | Jason Abers | |
| 2004 | Dead & Breakfast | Christian | |
| 2004 | The Heart Is Deceitful Above All Things | Chester | |
| 2004 | Method | Jake Fields | |
| 2004 | Film Trix 2004 | Himself | Documentary short |
| 2005 | The Nickel Children | The Doctor | |
| 2005 | A Lot Like Love | Ben Miller | |
| 2005 | In Memory of My Father | Jeremy | |
| 2005 | Clueless. Suck N' Blow – A Tutorial | Himself | Video documentary short |
| 2006 | Population 436 | Steve Kady | Video |
| 2006 | The Thirst | Darius | |
| 2006 | Unknown | Handcuffed Man | |
| 2006 | Broken | Will | |
| 2007 | Waitress | Earl Hunterson | |
| 2007 | Kidnapped: Ransom Notes | Himself | Video short |
| 2007 | The War Prayer | The Stranger | Short film |
| 2008 | Gardens of the Night | Jimmy | |
| 2008 | Justice League: The New Frontier | Batman | Voice, direct-to-video |
| 2008 | A Cat's Tale | Squirrel | Voice, direct-to-video |
| 2009 | Rosencrantz and Guildenstern Are Undead | Detective Wimbly | |
| 2009 | Into Temptation | Father John Buerlein | |
| 2010 | Asleep in the Park | | Producer, writer, director, cinematographer, editor |
| 2010 | Slippage | | Composer, short film |
| 2011 | Hook, Line and Sinker | Gordon | Short film, also executive producer |
| 2011 | Sironia | Tucker | |
| 2012 | Robot & Frank | Sheriff Rowlings | |
| 2012 | Blow Me | GoldenBoy | Short film |
| 2013 | Kids Like You & Me | | Producer |
| 2013 | As Cool as I Am | Guy Karlsburg | |
| 2014 | Break Point | Jimmy Price | Also writer and producer |
| 2015 | Batman vs. Robin | Talon | Voice, direct-to-video |
| 2015 | Hangman | Aaron Miller | Also producer |
| 2015 | H8RZ | Mr. Faustin | |
| 2016 | The Other Side of the Door | Michael Harwood | |
| 2016 | Love Is All You Need? | Mr. Thompson | |
| 2016 | The Second Sound Barrier | Roger Valour | Short film |
| 2016 | Girl Trip | Jonah | Short film |
| 2016 | Girl Flu. | Arlo | |
| 2017 | Star Citizen: Lost and Found | Sam Doherty | Voice, Video short Uncredited |
| 2017 | Ferdinand | Raf | Voice |
| 2018 | Hidden Heroes Gala: Alicia Silverstone Tribute | Himself | Short film |
| 2019 | Frozen II | King Runeard | Voice |
| 2020 | In the Footsteps of Elephant | Narrator | Documentary |
| 2020 | Wichita | Josh | Short film |
| 2021 | Last Night in Rozzie | Joey Donovan | |
| 2021 | Adrianne | Himself | Documentary |
| 2022 | Captain Tsunami's Army | Captain Tsunami | |
| 2023 | Last Straw | Edward Osborn | |
| 2026 | Rain Reign | TBA | |

=== Television ===
| Year | Title | Role | Notes |
|---|---|---|---|
| 1992 | Desperate Choices: To Save My Child | Josh Ryan | Television film |
| 1994 | The Shaggy Dog | Trey Miller | Television film |
| 1996 | Out of Order | | Episode: "Familiar Bonds" |
| 1997 | Duckman | Bobby | Voice, episode: "With Friends Like These" |
| 1997 | Rugrats | Larry | Voice, episode: "Angelica Orders Out/Let It Snow" |
| 1998 | Real Life | James Barrett III | Unaired pilot |
| 1998 | The Day Lincoln Was Shot | Frederick W. Seward | Television film |
| 1998–1999 | The Wild Thornberrys | Radio Announcer, D.J. | Voice, 2 episodes |
| 1999 | The '60s | Kenny Klein | Television film |
| 1999 | Jesus | Jesus | Television film |
| 2001 | The Outer Limits | Thomas | Episode: "A New Life" |
| 2001–2005 | Six Feet Under | Billy Chenowith | Main role (11 episodes); Recurring role (20 episodes) |
| 2003 | Julius Caesar | Gaius Julius Caesar | Television film |
| 2003 | The Twilight Zone | Grady Finch | Episode: "The Executions of Grady Finch" |
| 2003 | Dawson's Creek | Christopher | Episode: "All Good Things..." |
| 2003–2004 | Ancient Egyptians | Narrator | 2 episodes |
| 2004 | Punk'd | Himself | 1 episode |
| 2004 | Celebrity Poker Showdown | Himself | Episode: "Tournament 2, Game 3" |
| 2005 | World Poker Tour | Himself | Episode: "Hollywood Home Game VIII" |
| 2006–2015 | American Dad! | Mitch | Voice, 2 episodes |
| 2006 | Nightmares & Dreamscapes: From the Stories of Stephen King | Willie Evans | Episode: "The Fifth Quarter" |
| 2006–2007 | Kidnapped | Lucian Knapp | Main role, 13 episodes |
| 2007 | Numbers | AUSA Alvin Brickle | Episode: "The Art of Reckoning" |
| 2007 | Law & Order | Clint Glover | Episode: "The Family Hour" |
| 2007 | My Boys | Thorn | 2 episodes |
| 2008–2010 | Law & Order | Detective Cyrus Lupo | Main role, 63 episodes |
| 2010 | Saturday Night Live | Himself | Uncredited; Episode: "Zach Galifianakis/Vampire Weekend" |
| 2010 | Spy Wars | Narrator | |
| 2011–2014 | Suburgatory | George Altman | Main role, 57 episodes |
| 2013 | Air Force One Is Down | Fergus Markey | Television film |
| 2013 | Hell's Kitchen | Himself – Restaurant Patron | Episode: "7 Chefs Compete: Part 2" |
| 2013 | BlackBoxTV Presents | Jonathan | Episode: "Inside" |
| 2013 | Hollywood Help | Jeremy | |
| 2015 | The Returned | Peter Lattimore | Main role, 10 episodes |
| 2015 | Rent Control | George | Episode: "George" |
| 2015 | CollegeHumor Originals | Jeremy | Episode: "The Guy Who's Way Too Competitive (with Jeremy Sisto)" |
| 2015 | Last Week Tonight with John Oliver | Cop | Episode: "Public Defenders" |
| 2015 | Wicked City | Detective Jack Roth | Main role, 8 episodes |
| 2016 | The Jury | Dan | Television film |
| 2016–2018 | Ice | Freddy Green | Main role, 20 episodes |
| 2017 | The Long Road Home | Sgt. Robert Miltenberger | Miniseries |
| 2017 | Heroes of the Long Road Home | Himself | Television film documentary |
| 2018–present | FBI | Assistant Special Agent in Charge Jubal Valentine | Main role |
| 2019 | Awokened | Dretti | Television film |
| 2020 & 2023 | FBI: Most Wanted | Assistant Special Agent in Charge Jubal Valentine | 2 episodes |
| 2020 & 2023 | Hollywood Game Night | Himself – Celebrity Player | Episode: "7 Seconds of Kressley" |
| 2020 & 2023 | Robot Chicken | Marv Merchants, Tywin Lannister | Voice, episode: "Buster Olive in: The Monkey Got Closer Overnight" |
| 2020 & 2023 | To Tell the Truth | Himself – Panelist | Episode: "Yara Shahidi, Russell Peters, Michelle Buteau, Jeremy Sisto" |
| 2021–25 | FBI: International | Assistant Special Agent in Charge Jubal Valentine | 11 episodes |
| 2026 | CIA | Assistant Special Agent in Charge Jubal Valentine | 6 episodes |

== Other credits ==
=== Music videos ===
| Year | Title | Artist |
|---|---|---|
| 2007 | "Wake Up Call" (Original and Director's Cut versions) | Maroon 5 |
| 2012 | "Just Cuz" | Himself (as Escape Tailor) |

=== Soundtrack ===
- Six Feet Under – (performer: "Daddy Sang Bass") Episode: "Time Flies"

=== Stage ===
| Year | Title | Role | Location |
|---|---|---|---|
| 2004 | Take Me Out | Shane Mungitt | Geffen Playhouse, Los Angeles |
| 2006 | Festen | Mr. Klingenfelt | Music Box Theatre, Broadway |
| 2010 | Spirit Control | Adam Wyatt | New York City Center, Off-Broadway |

== Awards and nominations ==
| Year | Award | Category | Work | Result |
|---|---|---|---|---|
| 2002 | Screen Actors Guild Awards | Outstanding Ensemble in a Drama Series | Six Feet Under | Nominated |
| 2003 | Dahlonega International Film Festival | Jury Award for Best Actor – Feature Film | The Movie Hero | Won |
| 2003 | Cinequest Film Festival | Special Jury Maverick Acting Award | The Movie Hero | Won |
| 2004 | Los Angeles Drama Critics Circle Award | Featured Performance in a Play | Take Me Out | Nominated |
| 2006 | Screen Actors Guild Awards | Outstanding Ensemble in a Drama Series | Six Feet Under | Nominated |
| 2009 | Newport Beach Film Festival | Achievement Award | Into Temptation | Won |
| 2013 | Critics' Choice Television Awards | Best Actor in a Comedy Series | Suburgatory | Nominated |
