= Dave Malucci =

Fictional character from ER

- Erik Palladino as Dave Malucci
- First appearance: October 7, 1999 (6x02, "Last Rites")
- Last appearance: October 25, 2001 (8x04, "Never Say Never")
- Portrayed by: Erik Palladino
- Duration: 1999–2001

In-universe information
- Nickname: Dr. Dave
- Gender: Male
- Title: Resident (1999–2001)
- Occupation: Physician
- Children: Unnamed Child
- Born: 1972

Dr. Dave Malucci is a fictional character on the NBC prime time drama ER. He was portrayed by Erik Palladino.

== Season 6 ==
Dave Malucci first appears as a second-year resident. Though well-meaning, he often disregards rules, makes awkward social faux pas, speaks before thinking and sometimes appears to lack sensitivity for patients, but relates well with and is kind towards child patients. A story in the episode "Loose Ends" implies that Malucci was abused as a child. He usually has a cheerful disposition, and is proactive and eager to help or to take the lead on a problem, sometimes to his own detriment. In "Last Rites," Malucci convinces John Carter to help take medical gear from an ambulance to treat construction workers injured at a site not far from the hospital; later, Kerry Weaver reprimands them for violating emergency protocols. Malucci attended medical school in Grenada, and in "Great Expectations" his knowledge of the region helps him accurately diagnose a patient with Jamaican vomiting sickness. He also is fluent in Spanish and occasionally helps translate for Spanish-speaking patents; in one such case he learns from a patient the Hispanic community were purchasing banned and dangerous prescription drugs from an unscrupulous pharmacist on Halsted Street. Malucci tracks down the pharmacist and returns with a black eye and a vial of the illegal drugs, enabling the police to pursue charges. In "Such Sweet Sorrow," Malucci allows Abby Lockhart to discharge a female patient without examining her personally. The patient later suffers an internal injury and nearly dies. After performing surgery to save the patient, Elizabeth Corday bluntly tells Malucci the staff considers him a sloppy, lazy physician and that "[none of us] think you're much of a doctor."

Although his errors and glib manner were the source of several dramatic events, he was most often used for comic relief due to his offbeat personality and tendency to get pranked, injured, or end up doing odd things like eating cereal out of an emesis basin (with milk that, he didn't realize, was breast-pumped by Carol Hathaway). He and Jing-Mei Chen had a somewhat-tense relationship that hinted at possible signs of attraction between the two.

== Season 7 ==
Malucci continues to clash with other staff members in Season 7. In one early episode, Carter asks him to speak to a gay patient about his HIV positive partner and implores him to be sensitive to the topic. Malucci handles the situation delicately, but becomes visibly distraught upon learning the patient is bugchasing, indicating that he is not the insensitive oaf the others often perceive him to be. When Mark Greene discounts his view that a teenage patient is being mistreated by his father, Malucci (whose empathy toward victims of child abuse is a recurring theme) makes a snide remark about Greene's brain tumor, leading to friction between the two, though he does attend Mark and Elizabeth's wedding later in the season and is happy and congratulatory upon learning they will have a child. In "The Visit," Peter Benton's nephew Jesse dies in the ER from gunshot wounds, and Malucci's insensitive comments about gangs and subsequent attempt to apologize provoke Benton to physically assault him, resulting in a brawl between the two. Nonetheless, the two continue to work together and in the season finale, Malucci is quick to intervene and defend Peter when he is assaulted by his ex-girlfriend's husband. By this point his flirtations with Dr. Chen have disappeared; in one episode, Chen refuses to help Malucci with an uncooperative patient who winds up spraying Malucci with pepper spray.

== Season 8 ==
In "The Longer You Stay", Chen and Malucci attempt to treat a patient having failed to recognize his illness as Marfan syndrome; Malucci mistakenly believes the patient is a drug user and the procedure he and Chen perform proves to be fatal despite intervention by Carter. Kerry Weaver, the on-duty attending physician during this incident, was at Doc Magoo's across the street, misplaced her pager and so failed to respond to attempts to summon her. When she returns and learns of Chen and Malucci's procedure, which required her authorization to be performed, instead of owning up to misplacing her pager she becomes angry and tells Malucci "in a perfect world, Dr. Malucci, I would never subject any patients to your care." Chen becomes angry and resigns over the incident, though she later returns after learning about Weaver's complicity.

In "Blood, Sugar, Sex, Magic", Malucci is caught having sex with a paramedic in an ambulance; Weaver uses this as a pretext to fire him and makes him a scapegoat to cover her own failure to properly supervise Malucci and Chen. Mark Greene tells Weaver that she cannot fire Malucci simply because they dislike each other, since by that criterion "You'd have to fire all of us!". Weaver cites several letters of reprimand and two failed rotations on file, promising that even if the hospital chooses not to fire Malucci she will ensure he never works in the ER again. In a last-ditch effort to save his job Malucci reveals to Weaver that he has a child to support. Weaver implies he is lying and Malucci responds that she knows nothing about him because she never asked. Weaver insists he is still fired and Malucci retorts that the only reason she wants to control the ER is because she has nothing else in her life; he also says that although she dislikes him nobody at the hospital likes her. He leaves after calling her a "Nazi dyke". Malucci appears for the final time in "Never Say Never" when Weaver enters the doctor's lounge as he is cleaning out his locker. After an awkward moment he leaves the hospital and is never seen again.

Malucci was the first of four characters to leave in season 8. He is mentioned in the episode "Brothers and Sisters", when Dr. Carter tells medical student Michael Gallant that Malucci was "a hotshot who thought he knew everything" and "killed a patient". This was the last time Malucci's name was mentioned by any of the characters on the show.

Palladino stated on a 2021 ER-focused podcast that he left the series by choice after he told producers he wanted Malucci to develop into a more serious and competent character. The producers declined this request and rather than signing an offered long-term deal, he chose a shorter series of episodes leading to Malucci's exit from the series.

== Season 15 ==
During the 15th and final season of ER, at the end of the episode "The Book of Abby", long-serving nurse Haleh Adams shows the departing Abby Lockhart a closet wall where all the past doctors and employees have put their locker name tags before leaving County for good. Amongst them, the tag "Malucci" can be seen. Palladino was contacted by producers to make a guest appearance in the show's 15th and final season but he declined.
