= Against the Current (film) =

- Official film poster
- Directed by: Peter Callahan
- Written by: Peter Callahan
- Produced by: Mary Jane Skalski; Joshua Zeman
- Starring: Joseph Fiennes; Pell James; Justin Kirk; Elizabeth Reaser; Martin Shakar; Mary Tyler Moore; Michelle Trachtenberg
- Cinematography: Sean Kirby
- Edited by: Michael Taylor
- Music by: Anton Sanko
- Distributed by: Ambush Entertainment
- Release date: January 18, 2009
- Running time: 98 minutes
- Country: United States
- Language: English
- Budget: $3 million

Against the Current is a 2009 American drama film released by Ambush Entertainment directed by Peter Callahan and starring Joseph Fiennes, Pell James, Justin Kirk, Elizabeth Reaser, Martin Shakar, Michelle Trachtenberg, and Mary Tyler Moore in her final film role.

== Plot ==
Paul Thompson is a writer who lost his wife and child a few years back. He and his best friend, Jeff, have talked about swimming the length of the Hudson River since they were kids. Paul asks Jeff to come along with him on his trip to finally swim the river. Jeff agrees and brings along one of his friends, Liz. Paul is determined to reach the end of the river by a certain date, August 28.

Jeff and Liz have no idea the importance of the date Paul has chosen until they realize that the date they are supposed to finish the swim is the anniversary of his family's death. Paul tells them that on that date, he is planning on killing himself. Paul's confession causes Jeff to remember a moment about five years ago when he saved Paul from committing suicide. Jeff told him that he should wait five years and if he still wanted to end his life, he would support him in it. Now, five years later, Jeff and Liz have to decide whether they should let Paul continue with his plan or try to convince him to keep living.

== Cast ==
- Joseph Fiennes as Paul Thompson
- Justin Kirk as Jeff Kane
- Elizabeth Reaser as Liz Clark
- Michelle Trachtenberg as Suzanne
- Pell James as Amy Thompson
- Constance Barron as Aunt Karen
- Amy Hargreaves as Sarah Kane
- Mary Tyler Moore as Liz's Mom
- Samantha Sherman as Katie
- Martin Shakar as Boatyard Owner
- Avery Glymph as Fisherman #1
- Chad Brigockas as Fisherman #2
- Tom O'Rourke as Dock Man #1
- John Rue as Dock Man #2
- Douglas Odell as Dock Man #3
- Seth Kanor as Officer Lefurgy
- Nimo Gandhi as Pasthule
- Maggie Brown as Little Girl on Waterfront
- Perry Callahan as Older Girl on Waterfront
