= Radioactive (Imagine Dragons song) =

2012 single by Imagine Dragons

Single by Imagine Dragons

from the album Night Visions
- Released: October 29, 2012
- Recorded: December 2011 – April 2012
- Studio: Westlake Recording Studios (Los Angeles, CA)
- Genre: Electronic rock; alternative rock; stadium rock
- Length: 3:07
- Label: KidinaKorner; Interscope
- Songwriters: Alex da Kid; Ben McKee; Dan Reynolds; Daniel Wayne Sermon; Josh Mosser
- Producer: Alex da Kid

Imagine Dragons singles chronology
"It's Time" (2012)	"Radioactive" (2012)	"Hear Me" (2012)

Music video
- "Radioactive" on YouTube

"Radioactive" is a song by American pop rock band Imagine Dragons from their major-label debut EP Continued Silence and later on their debut studio album, Night Visions (2012), as the lead single. It was first sent to modern rock radio on October 29, 2012, and then released to contemporary hit radio on April 9, 2013. Musically, "Radioactive" is an electronic rock and alternative rock song with elements of dubstep.

The song received positive reviews from critics, who praised the production, lyrics, and vocals, calling it a highlight on the album. Due to heavy rotation on various commercials and trailers, the song became a sleeper hit, peaking at number three on the US Billboard Hot 100 chart and becoming the band's first top 10 single as well as being the third best selling song in the US in 2013. It remains the band’s highest charting single on the chart. It also broke the record for slowest ascension to the top 5 in chart history and held the record for most weeks spent on the Billboard Hot 100 at 87 weeks, a record for over seven years. The song has also reached number one in Sweden and in the top 20 in several countries including Australia, Canada, New Zealand and the United Kingdom, becoming Imagine Dragons' most successful single to date. It has since been certified Diamond (17× Platinum) in the US, making it one of the best selling singles ever.

"Radioactive" received two Grammy Awards nominations for Record of the Year and Best Rock Performance, winning the latter. This was Imagine Dragons' first time being nominated. During the broadcast, they presented a remix of the song with their Interscope label-mate, rapper Kendrick Lamar. The remix was later released for purchase on iTunes.

== Composition ==
"Radioactive" was written by Imagine Dragons and producer Alex da Kid. It is one of the more electronically influenced tracks on Night Visions as well as one of the darkest, similar to fourth track "Demons". The song is an electronic rock, alternative rock and stadium rock song with elements of dubstep.

The song's lyrics speak of apocalyptic themes: 'I'm waking up to ash and dust' and 'This is it, the apocalypse'. Though the band has publicly maintained its secularity, NPR music critic Ann Powers has opined that the song features strong "religious or spiritual imagery", the likes of which have been common throughout the history of rock music.

Speaking on the song, lead singer Dan Reynolds said:

"Radioactive, to me, it's very masculine, powerful-sounding song, and the lyrics behind it, there's a lot of personal story behind it, but generally speaking, it's a song about having an awakening; kind of waking up one day and deciding to do something new, and see life in a fresh way."

— Dan Reynolds

In a 2021 interview, Reynolds revealed that, on looking back at the song after almost a decade, he had realized that its lyrics were actually about him not giving up hope after losing faith in Mormonism.

Sheet music for "Radioactive" shows the key of B Dorian (a mode of F# minor or A major, in which B is used as the tonic), in 4/4 common time, and a tempo of 132bpm, with a chord progression of Bm-DSus2-A-E, and vocals spanning from E3 to B4.

== Critical reception ==
"Radioactive"
"Radioactive" is one of the more electronically influenced tracks on Night Visions.

"Radioactive" was released to positive reviews. Anne Erickson of Audio Ink Radio gave the song a rating of 4.5 out of 5, calling it "hook-y [and] emotional", and stated that the "drama" and "excitement" of the song would allow "Radioactive" to appeal to both alternative pop fans and hard rockers. AbsolutePunk gave a positive review, calling the acoustic section of the song "haunting", and called the chorus "hypnotizing". Dara Hickey of Unreality Shout also reacted positively, calling the song the "darkest moment" on the album, and stated that, like all the other songs on the album, "Radioactive" was successful in creating a sound that "never fails to take off and send fists skyward". IGN lauded the song, calling it "strangely intense and abrasive", and stated that "Radioactive" was "perhaps the greatest calling card of Imagine Dragons".

Crave Online called the song an "opening throb", saying that the song "sexes up the dub-flirtation with a verse hingeing on the line 'this is it, the apocalypse' and a triumphant chorus, with more than a few shades of Hip-Hop in the production", and that the song was as "radio-ready as they come". Our Vinyl stated that the "power of this song is outstanding with heavy drums and more of an electronic feel than the rest of the album and strong, impressive vocals from front-man Dan Reynolds which are reciprocated throughout the LP." Jon Dolan of Rolling Stone was critical of the song, calling it "a dour moaner that sound[s] like Chris Martin trying to write an Eminem ballad about the end of the world."

In 2018, Billboard and Louder Sound ranked the song number two and number one, respectively, on their lists of the 10 greatest Imagine Dragons songs.

It is also on the soundtrack for NBA 2K14, the first NBA 2K game on PlayStation 4 and Xbox One.

The song also appeared in the 2023 video game Fortnite Festival.

== Chart performance ==
"Radioactive" debuted at 96 on the Billboard Hot 100 after the release of Night Visions in September 2012 and remained at the lower ends of the chart for some time. In April 2013, the song made its top ten entry at number seven, besting the number 15 position set by previous single "It's Time". In mid-June, the song reached number four, breaking the record for the slowest ascension to the top five, besting the previous holder Florida Georgia Line's song "Cruise", which broke the record just three weeks earlier. Two weeks later, the song reached its peak at number three. The song formerly held the record for the longest reign atop the Billboard Hot Rock Songs chart at 23 weeks before being surpassed by Walk the Moon's "Shut Up and Dance". "Radioactive" held the record for the longest reign atop the Billboard Rock Airplay chart, with 24 weeks, until "Ensenada" by Sublime broke the record in 2026. It also spent 13 weeks at number one on the Alternative Airplay component chart. In late 2023, for Alternative Airplay's 35th anniversary, Billboard placed "Radioactive" at number eight on its ranking of the top 100 largest hits in the chart's history.

The song is also the best-selling rock song in US digital history. It was the No. 2 Song of the Summer according to Billboard and spent 87 weeks on the Billboard Hot 100, breaking the all-time chart longevity record, previously held by Jason Mraz's 2008 single "I'm Yours", and overtaken by the Weeknd's 2019 single "Blinding Lights", which spent 90 weeks on the Hot 100 as of the chart issue dated September 4, 2021. However, it still holds the record for most consecutive weeks on the Hot 100, at 85. It has sold more copies in a calendar year than any other song by a rock act in digital history. "Radioactive" was the third best selling song of 2013 with sales of 5,496,000 for the year. It has gone on to sell 8,234,360 digital copies in the nation as of September 2017, and was certified Diamond by the Recording Industry Association of America (RIAA).

The song has reached number one in Sweden and in the top twenty of several countries such as Australia, Canada, New Zealand as well as several parts of Europe. In the UK, the song debuted at 35 thanks to strong downloads from the Hear Me EP in November. After the release of Night Visions in April, the song peaked at number 12, becoming their highest charting single there.

== Music video ==
The music video debuted on December 10, 2012. Directed by Syndrome and featuring puppeteers from Puppet Heap, the video revolves around a mysterious female drifter, played by actress Alexandra Daddario, on a quest to save her friends in Imagine Dragons from the perils of a sinister, underground puppet-fighting ring, the ringleader of which is played by Lou Diamond Phillips. The Champion of the fight, Gorigula, a large purple beast, beats and kills innocent stuffed animals and puppets forced to fight. After one puppet, Screaming Richard, is killed, the woman's pink teddy bear puppet enters the ring and fights Gorigula, initially being beaten up. After rising from the ground, the teddy bear knocks out Gorigula with a single superpower punch. The ringleader sends two bodyguards to subdue the teddy, whose laser vision disintegrates both of them. The remaining spectators flee, leaving the drifter with the stunned ringleader. The drifter takes a key off the chain around the ringleader's neck and the pink bear pulls the lever, causing the ringleader to fall in the dungeon. The drifter unlocks the door and frees the band. They climb out as the puppets and stuffed animals bid them farewell. The ringleader is left in the dungeon where the earlier-defeated puppets and stuffed animals soon surround and attack him.

Speaking of the video to MTV, Reynolds said "We read through a ton of scripts from really talented directors, and we came across one that stood out to us in particular, because it put into visuals the general theme of the song, which is kind of an empowering song about an awakening, but it did it in a way that was very different". "A lot of people probably see a post-apocalyptic world when they hear 'Radioactive', understandably, but we wanted to deliver something that was maybe a little different from that ... a lot different from that."

The music video reached one billion views on YouTube in February 2019.

== Credits and personnel ==
Adapted from Night Visions liner notes.

Imagine Dragons

- Dan Reynolds – lead and backing vocals
- Wayne Sermon – guitars, backing vocals
- Ben McKee – synthesizers, bass guitar, backing vocals
- Daniel Platzman – drums, drum machine

Additional musicians

- J Browz – guitar

Additional personnel

- Alexander Grant – co-writer, producer
- Josh Mosser – co-writer
- Manny Marroquin – mixing
- Joe LaPorta – mastering

== Live performances ==
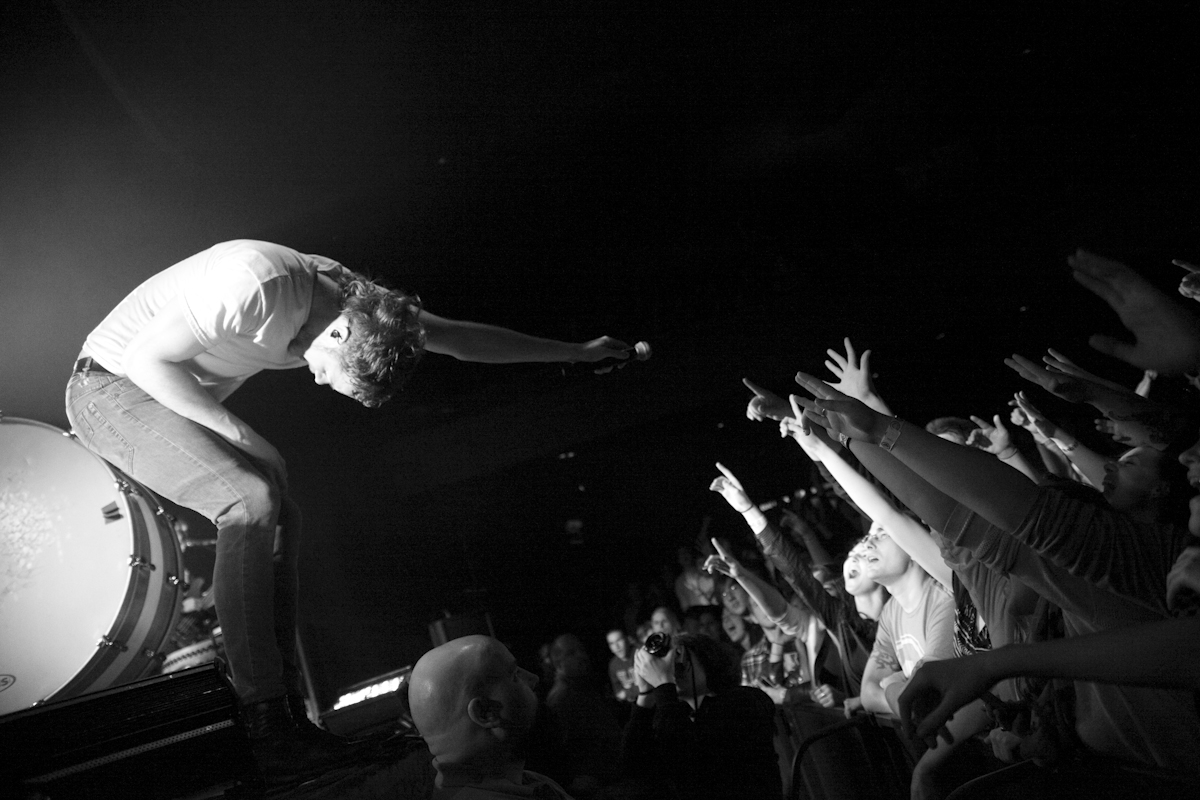
Imagine Dragons performing "Radioactive" at The Pageant in St. Louis, Missouri.

The first televised performance of "Radioactive" was on the September 4, 2012 airing of ABC late-night talk show Jimmy Kimmel Live!. The song was performed alongside then-current single "It's Time".

In February 2013, the band started the 145-date Night Visions Tour, which saw the band perform across North America and Europe. During the North American leg, the band made their first national television appearance, performing "Radioactive" on the February 22, 2013 airing of CBS late-night talk show Late Show with David Letterman.

In addition to performing the song on the March 28, 2013 airing of NBC late-night talk show The Tonight Show with Jay Leno, the band also performed "Radioactive" on the July 29, 2013 airing of NBC late-night talk show Late Night with Jimmy Fallon, following the historic performance of "It's Time" to an empty audience during Hurricane Sandy on the October 29, 2012 airing of Late Night. They performed the song on Saturday Night Live with a guest performance by Kendrick Lamar on February 2, 2014, recreating their teamed performance of the song at the Grammy Awards the previous month.

As one of Taylor Swift's many guest appearances on her 1989 World Tour, frontman Dan Reynolds performed the song with her in Detroit, Michigan.

Typical live performances of the song now have incorporated a drum solo and a guitar solo.

== Remixes and covers ==
"Weird Al" Yankovic recorded a parody version entitled "Inactive" for his 2014 album Mandatory Fun. "Radioactive" was covered by American violinist Lindsey Stirling with Texan a cappella group Pentatonix and uploaded to Stirling's YouTube channel, becoming immensely successful and as of July 2026 has over 198 million views. The recording subsequently earned a 2013 YouTube Award. Jason Derulo covered the song live on BBC. Daughtry covered the song live on SiriusXM. Lady Antebellum covered the song live backstage on their Take Me Downtown Tour and put the video on their YouTube channel. Jake Bugg covered the song live on BBC Radio 1.

Dutch symphonic metal band Within Temptation recorded a version on their cover album The Q-Music Sessions released in April 2013, which was released again on their album Hydra. American post-hardcore band Our Last Night covered the song. Masha covered "Radioactive" on her popular YouTube channel on May 25, 2013; the video has received 130,000 views as of December 2018. The Radioactive Chicken Heads recorded a punk rock cover of "Radioactive" and released a music video for their version on YouTube. Ed Kowalczyk (of Live) covered the song for an Australian radio station. Country music artist Dallas Smith covered the song on his Tippin' Point tour.

American singer Madilyn Bailey recorded an acoustic cover that reached number 36 on SNEP, the official French singles chart, in June 2015. Kelly Clarkson covered the song as part of her "Fan Requests" on July 12, 2015, during her Piece by Piece Tour.

Welsh metalcore band Bullet for My Valentine recorded a cover in 2018 on their sixth studio album Gravity.

The song is included as a playable routine in the 2022 dance rhythm game Just Dance 2023 Edition. The choreography features the first Just Dance performer to use a wheelchair. The routine won the award for Best Representation at The Game Accessibility Conference on January 25, 2023.

== Charts ==
=== Weekly charts ===
Weekly chart performance for "Radioactive"
Chart (2012–2015)	Peak position
Australia (ARIA)	6
Austria (Ö3 Austria Top 40)	4
Belgium (Ultratip Bubbling Under Flanders)	11
Belgium (Ultratop 50 Wallonia)	13
Canada Hot 100 (Billboard)	5
Canada AC (Billboard)	33
Canada CHR/Top 40 (Billboard)	7
Canada Hot AC (Billboard)	10
Canada Rock (Billboard)	7
Czech Republic Airplay (ČNS IFPI)	11
Czech Republic Singles Digital (ČNS IFPI)	8
Denmark (Tracklisten)	6
Euro Digital Song Sales (Billboard)	8
France (SNEP)	28
Germany (GfK)	4
Hungary (Single Top 40)	24
Hungary (Stream Top 40)	24
Ireland (IRMA)	16
Italy (FIMI)	11
Japan Hot 100 (Billboard)	77
Lebanon (Lebanese Top 20)	13
Luxembourg Digital Song Sales (Billboard)	3
Netherlands (Single Top 100)	42
New Zealand (Recorded Music NZ)	4
Norway (VG-lista)	2
Scottish Singles Sales (Official Charts)	13
Slovakia Singles Digital (ČNS IFPI)	40
Slovenia (SloTop50)	33
Spain (Promusicae)	22
Sweden (Sverigetopplistan)	1
Switzerland (Schweizer Hitparade)	5
UK Singles (Official Charts)	12
US Billboard Hot 100	3
US Adult Contemporary (Billboard)	20
US Adult Pop Airplay (Billboard)	2
US Dance Airplay (Billboard)	15
US Pop Airplay (Billboard)	2
US Rhythmic Airplay (Billboard)	32
US Rock & Alternative Airplay (Billboard)	1
US Hot Rock & Alternative Songs (Billboard)	1

=== Year-end charts ===
2012 year-end chart performance for "Radioactive"
Chart (2012)	Position
Sweden (Sverigetopplistan)	72

2013 year-end chart performance for "Radioactive"
Chart (2013)	Position
Australia (ARIA)	20
Austria (Ö3 Austria Top 40)	14
Canada (Canadian Hot 100)	9
France (SNEP)	96
Germany (Media Control AG)	9
New Zealand (Recorded Music NZ)	7
Sweden (Sverigetopplistan)	15
Switzerland (Schweizer Hitparade)	24
UK Singles (Official Charts Company	30
US Billboard Hot 100	3
US Adult Pop Songs (Billboard)	10
US Mainstream Top 40 (Billboard)	7
US Rock Airplay (Billboard)	1
US Hot Rock Songs (Billboard)	1

2014 year-end chart performance for "Radioactive"
Chart (2014)	Position
Belgium (Ultratop 50 Wallonia)	31
Canada (Canadian Hot 100)	77
France (SNEP)	65
Italy (FIMI)	60
Sweden (Sverigetopplistan)	65
US Billboard Hot 100	57
US Hot Rock Songs (Billboard)	9

2015 year-end chart performance for "Radioactive"
Chart (2015)	Position
France (SNEP)	174

=== Decade-end charts ===
Decade-end chart performance for "Radioactive"
Chart (2010–19)	Position
Australia (ARIA)	55
Germany (Official German Charts)	47
UK Singles (Official Charts Company)	71
US Billboard Hot 100	36
US Hot Rock Songs (Billboard)	3

== Certifications ==
Certifications and sales for "Radioactive"
Region	Certification	Certified units/sales
Australia (ARIA)	10× Platinum	700,000^{‡}
Austria (IFPI Austria)	2× Platinum	60,000^{*}
Belgium (BRMA)	Gold	15,000^{*}
Brazil (Pro-Música Brasil)	4× Diamond	1,000,000^{‡}
Canada (Music Canada)	Diamond	800,000^{‡}
Denmark (IFPI Danmark)	Gold	15,000^{^}
Germany (BVMI)	4× Platinum	1,200,000^{‡}
Italy (FIMI)	4× Platinum	200,000^{‡}
Mexico (AMPROFON)	Platinum	60,000^{*}
New Zealand (RMNZ)	7× Platinum	210,000^{‡}
Norway (IFPI Norway)	2× Platinum	20,000^{*}
Spain (Promusicae)	3× Platinum	180,000^{‡}
Sweden (GLF)	6× Platinum	240,000^{‡}
Switzerland (IFPI Switzerland)	Platinum	30,000^{^}
United Kingdom (BPI)	4× Platinum	2,400,000^{‡}
United States (RIAA)	17× Platinum	17,000,000^{‡}
Streaming
Denmark (IFPI Danmark)	4× Platinum	7,200,000^{†}
Norway (IFPI Norway)	5× Platinum	15,000,000^{†}
Spain (Promusicae)	Platinum	8,000,000^{†}
^{*} Sales figures based on certification alone.^{^} Shipments figures based on certification alone.^{‡} Sales+streaming figures based on certification alone.^{†} Streaming-only figures based on certification alone.

== Accolades ==
Awards and nominations for "Radioactive"
Year	Ceremony	Award	Result
2013	Capricho Awards	Best International Hit	Nominated
2013	MTV Video Music Awards	Best Rock Video	Nominated
2013	MuchMusic Video Awards	International Video of the Year (Group)	Nominated
2013	Teen Choice Awards	Choice Rock Song	Won
2013	UK Festival Awards	Anthem of the Summer	Nominated
2014	Billboard Music Awards	Top Hot 100 Song	Nominated
2014	Billboard Music Awards	Top Digital Song	Nominated
2014	Billboard Music Awards	Top Streaming Song	Won
2014	Billboard Music Awards	Top Rock Song	Nominated
2014	Grammy Awards	Record of the Year	Nominated
2014	Grammy Awards	Best Rock Performance	Won
2014	iHeartRadio Music Awards	Song of the Year	Nominated
2014	International Dance Music Awards	Best Alternative/Indie Rock Dance Track	Won
2014	People's Choice Awards	Favorite Song	Nominated

Accolades for "Radioactive"
Publication	Country	Accolade	Year	Rank
Nielsen SoundScan	United States	The 15 Most Downloaded Songs in Rock History	2015	1
Pandora Radio	Worldwide	Most Liked Tracks of All Time (World)	2015	3
Spotify	United States	Most Streamed Tracks of 2013 (U.S.)	2013	1
Spotify	United Kingdom	Most Streamed Tracks of 2013 (UK)	2013	4
Bing	United States	Most Searched Tracks of 2013 (U.S.)	2013	4
Bing	Canada	Most Searched Tracks of 2013 (CAN)	2013	5
Google	Worldwide	Most Searched Songs of 2013 (World)	2013	10
Rdio	Worldwide	Top Global Tracks	2013	4
Rdio	United States	Top U.S. Tracks	2013	2
SoundHound	Worldwide	Top Songs of 2013	2013	7
105.7 The Point	United States	Top 105 of 2013	2013	1
106.7 KROQ	United States	KROQ's Top 50 Songs of 2013	2013	1

== Release history ==
Release dates and formats for "Radioactive"
Country	Date	Format	Label	Catalog no.
United States	October 29, 2012	Modern rock radio	Interscope	none
United States	March 25, 2013	Adult contemporary radio	Interscope	none
United States	April 9, 2013	Contemporary hit radio	Interscope	none
Italy	April 19, 2013	Contemporary hit radio	Universal	none
Germany	May 3, 2013	CD	Interscope; KIDinaKORNER	0602537399185
Canada	June 4, 2013	Digital download (Grouplove and Captain Cuts remix)	Interscope; KIDinaKORNER	none
United States	June 4, 2013	Digital download (Grouplove and Captain Cuts remix)	Interscope; KIDinaKORNER	none

== Kendrick Lamar remix ==
"Radioactive"

Single by Imagine Dragons featuring Kendrick Lamar

from the album Night Visions (Deluxe)
- Released: January 27, 2014
- Genre: Alternative rock; electronic rock; rap rock
- Length: 4:43
- Label: KIDinaKORNER; Interscope
- Songwriters: Alexander Grant; Ben McKee; Josh Mosser; Daniel Platzman; Dan Reynolds; Wayne Sermon; Kendrick Duckworth
- Producer: Alexander Grant

Imagine Dragons singles chronology
"Monster" (2013)	"Radioactive" (2014)	"Battle Cry" (2014)

Kendrick Lamar singles chronology
"Forbidden Fruit" (2013)	"Radioactive" (2014)	"Nosetalgia" (2014)

Audio
- "Radioactive" (Remix) on YouTube

The Night Visions track was remixed by the band, featuring guest vocals from American rapper Kendrick Lamar. The remix, while retaining most of the original track from Continued Silence, was recorded by the band and Kendrick Lamar for release as a single. The single was released on January 27, 2014.

=== Live performances ===
"Radioactive" was first performed by Imagine Dragons and Kendrick Lamar at the 56th Annual Grammy Awards, held at the Staples Center, Los Angeles on January 26, 2014. The song was performed in a mashup with Kendrick Lamar's "M.A.A.D City", a track from his Grammy-nominated album Good Kid, M.A.A.D City. It was the second most-tweeted music moment of 2014. The song was performed by the duo again on the February 1, 2014 airing of NBC late-night live television sketch comedy and variety show Saturday Night Live.

=== Track listing ===
Digital download
No.	Title	Writer(s)	Producer(s)	Length
1.	"Radioactive" (featuring Kendrick Lamar)	McKee; Platzman; Reynolds; Sermon; Grant; Mosser; Kendrick Duckworth	Grant	4:43

=== Credits and personnel ===
Partly adapted from Night Visions liner notes.

Imagine Dragons

- Dan Reynolds – vocals
- Wayne Sermon – guitar
- Ben McKee – bass
- Daniel Platzman – drums, viola

Additional personnel

- Alexander Grant – co-writer, producer
- Josh Mosser – co-writer
- Timmy 2Tone – co-writer
- Manny Marroquin – mixing
- Joe LaPorta – mastering

Additional musicians

- Kendrick Lamar – vocals
- J Browz – guitar

=== Charts ===
Chart performance for "Radioactive"
Chart (2014)	Peak position
UK Singles (Official Charts)	32

=== Accolades ===
Accolades and formats for "Radioactive"
Year	Ceremony	Award	Result
2014	mtvU Woodie Awards	Best Collaboration Woodie	Nominated

=== Release history ===
Release dates and formats for "Radioactive"
Country	Date	Format	Label
Australia	January 27, 2014	Digital download	Interscope; KIDinaKORNER
Canada	January 27, 2014	Digital download	Interscope; KIDinaKORNER
Germany	January 27, 2014	Digital download	Interscope; KIDinaKORNER
United Kingdom	January 27, 2014	Digital download	Interscope; KIDinaKORNER
United States	January 27, 2014	Digital download	Interscope; KIDinaKORNER

== See also ==
- List of best-selling singles in Australia
