= Erik Palladino =

American actor (born 1968)

- Palladino in 2026
- Born: May 10, 1968 (age 58); Yonkers, New York, U.S.
- Occupation: Actor
- Years active: 1994–present
- Children: 3

Erik Palladino (born May 10, 1968) is an American film and television actor. He is best known for his portrayal of Dr. Dave Malucci on the NBC medical drama ER, Frank in the Amazon Prime Video series The Marvelous Mrs. Maisel, and Pino, the head of the Genovese crime family, in the MGM+ series Godfather of Harlem. Over his career, Palladino has appeared in a wide range of film and television roles, including U-571, Finders Fee, Can’t Hardly Wait, and the 2024 thriller Skincare opposite Elizabeth Banks.

== Career ==
Palladino began his career in the early 1990s, playing the role of Nick on Comedy Central’s Short Attention Span Theater opposite comedian Marc Maron. He went on to star in Amy Sherman’s FOX sitcom Love and Marriage, his first series-regular role.

He gained national recognition in 1999 when he joined NBC’s long-running medical drama ER as Dr. Dave Malucci, appearing during the show’s sixth and seventh seasons. During his tenure on ER, Palladino co-starred with Harvey Keitel, Matthew McConaughey, and Bill Paxton in the World War II submarine drama U-571 (2000), which opened at number one at the U.S. box office.

Over the following years, he built a steady career across film and television, taking on recurring and starring roles in series including the FX war drama Over There, in which he played Sergeant Scream, CBS’s Joan of Arcadia, USA Network’s Suits, and the CBS series NCIS and NCIS: Los Angeles. In 2008 he played a lead role in Hotel California, a thriller set in Los Angeles.

From 2019 to 2023, Palladino portrayed Frank in the Emmy-winning Amazon Prime Video series The Marvelous Mrs. Maisel. He later joined the MGM+ crime drama Godfather of Harlem as Pino, head of the Genovese crime family, acting opposite Forest Whitaker and Vincent D’Onofrio.

His feature-film credits include Finders Fee, The New Daughter, Hotel California, and Skincare. He was cast in Peter Farrelly’s I Play Rocky, distributed by Amazon MGM Studios, and in the action thriller Father Joe.
