= Alex da Kid production discography =

British discography

The following list is a discography of production by Alex da Kid, a British hip hop and pop music producer from London. It includes a list of songs produced, co-produced and remixed by year, artist, album and title.

== Singles produced ==
List of singles as either producer or co-producer, with selected chart positions and certifications, showing year released, performing artists and album name
Title	Year	Peak chart positions										Certifications	Album
Title	Year	US	US R&B	US Rap	AUS	CAN	FRA	GER	NZ	SWE	UK	Certifications	Album
"Hello Heartbreak" (Michelle Williams)	2008	—	—	—	—	—	—	—	—	—	—		Unexpected
"Massive Attack" (Nicki Minaj)	2010	122	65	—	—	—	—	—	—	—	—		non-album single
"Airplanes" (B.o.B featuring Hayley Williams)	2010	2	65	2	2	2	89	8	1	10	1	RIAA: 4× Platinum; ARIA: 3× Platinum; BVMI: Gold; MC: 3× Platinum; BPI: Platinum; RIANZ: Platinum	B.o.B Presents: The Adventures of Bobby Ray
"Love the Way You Lie" (Eminem featuring Rihanna)	2010	1	1	1	1	1	1	1	1	1	2	RIAA: 11× Platinum (Diamond); ARIA: 9× Platinum; BPI: 2× Platinum; BVMI: Platinum; IFPI SWI: 3× Platinum; RIANZ: 2× Platinum	Recovery
"Coming Home" (Diddy-Dirty Money featuring Skylar Grey)	2010	11	83	21	4	7	8	4	5	8	4	RIAA: 2× Platinum; ARIA: 3× Platinum; BPI: Silver	Last Train to Paris
"I Need a Doctor" (Dr. Dre featuring Eminem and Skylar Grey)	2011	4	124	16	12	8	29	25	23	56	8	RIAA: 2× Platinum; BPI: Silver	non-album single
"Words I Never Said" (Lupe Fiasco featuring Skylar Grey)	2011	89	—	—	—	—	—	—	—	—	—		Lasers
"Rise Above 1" (Reeve Carney featuring Bono and The Edge)	2011	74	—	—	—	71	—	—	—	—	—		Spider-Man: Turn Off the Dark
"Dance Without You" (Skylar Grey)	2011	—	—	—	—	—	—	—	—	—	—		non-album singles
"Invisible" (Skylar Grey)	2011	—	—	—	—	—	—	86	—	—	63		non-album singles
"Invincible" (MGK featuring Ester Dean)	2011	108	110	—	—	—	—	—	—	—	—		Lace Up
"Under the Sun" (Cheryl)	2011	—	—	—	—	—	—	—	—	—	13		A Million Lights
"C'mon Let Me Ride" (Skylar Grey featuring Eminem)	2012	—	—	—	—	82	—	—	17	—	—		Don't Look Down
"Radioactive" (Imagine Dragons)	2012	3	—	—	6	2	28	4	4	1	12	RIAA: 9× Platinum; ARIA: 4× Platinum; BPI: Platinum; BVMI: Platinum; IFPI SWE: 6× Platinum; IFPI SWI: Platinum; MC: 3× Platinum; RMNZ: 3× Platinum	Night Visions
"Demons" (Imagine Dragons)	2013	6	—	—	11	4	15	15	12	7	13	ARIA: 2× Platinum; BPI: Silver; IFPI SWE: 4× Platinum; IFPI SWI: Gold; MC: Platinum; RMNZ: Platinum	Night Visions
"On Top of the World" (Imagine Dragons)	2013	79	—	—	10	43	35	13	10	40	34	ARIA: 3× Platinum; BPI: Silver; IFPI SWE: 2× Platinum; RMNZ: Platinum	Night Visions
"Final Warning" (Skylar Grey)	2013	—	—	—	—	—	—	—	—	—	—		Don't Look Down
"Monster" (Imagine Dragons)	2013	78	—	—	—	41	—	—	—	—	—		non-album single
"Jungle (Remix)" (X Ambassadors & Jamie N Commons featuring JAY Z)	2014	—	—	—	—	—	—	—	—	—	—		non-album single
"I Bet My Life" (Imagine Dragons)	2014	28	—	—	36	15	42	65	28	—	27	MC: Platinum; RIAA: Platinum	Smoke + Mirrors
"Bed of Lies" (Nicki Minaj featuring Skylar Grey)	2014	62	19	—	7	41	134	—	13	11	73	ARIA: Platinum; RMNZ: Gold; GLF: 2× Platinum	The Pinkprint
"Gold" (Imagine Dragons)	2014	—	—	—	—	—	—	—	—	—	—		Smoke + Mirrors
"Burning Bridges" (Ludacris featuring Jason Aldean)	2014	—	—	—	—	—	—	—	—	—	—		Ludaversal
"American Oxygen" (Rihanna)	2015	78	—	—	65	59	25	39	—	11	71	GLF: Platinum	non-album single
"Renegades" (X Ambassadors)	2015	17	—	—	43	6	10	10	—	70	38	ARIA: Gold; MC: 4× Platinum; SNEP: Gold; BVMI: Gold; BPI: Silver; RIAA: Platinum	VHS
"Unsteady" (X Ambassadors)	2015	20	—	—	94	61	—	—	—	—	—	MC: Platinum; RIAA: 2× Platinum	VHS
"Sucker for Pain" (Lil Wayne, Wiz Khalifa, Imagine Dragons, Logic, Ty Dolla Sign and X Ambassadors)	2016	15	3	—	7	19	18	8	5	9	11	ARIA: Platinum; SNEP: Gold; RMNZ: Gold; BPI: Silver; RIAA: 2× Platinum	Suicide Squad
"Not Easy" (Alex da Kid featuring X Ambassadors, Elle King and Wiz Khalifa)	2016	---	---	---	73	---	---	---	---	---	---		non-album singles
"American Funeral" (Joseph Angel)	2017	---	---	---	---	---	---	---	---	---	---		non-album singles
"Thunder" (Imagine Dragons)	2017	4	---	---	12	44	181	3	4	10	26	FIMI: Gold; RMNZ: Gold; IFPI: Gold	EVOLVE

== Writing and production credits ==
Title	Year	Artist(s)	Album	Writer(s)	Producer(s)	Ref
"Going In"	2008	Kardinal Offishall	Not 4 Sale	Alexander Grant, Jason Harrow	Alex da Kid	
"I'm Leavin'"	2008	Rock City, Akon, Swizz Beatz	—N/a	Timothy Thomas, Theron Thomas, Aliaune Thiam, Kasseem Dean, Alexander Grant	Alex da Kid, Swizz Beatz	
"All Out of Tune"	2009	Alesha Dixon	The Alesha Show		Alex da Kid	
"Massive Attack"	2010	Nicki Minaj, Sean Garrett	—N/a	Alexander Grant, Sean Garrett, Onika Maraj	Alex da Kid, Sean Garrett	
"Airplanes"	2010	B.o.B, Hayley Williams	B.o.B Presents: The Adventures of Bobby Ray	Jeremy Dussolliet, Justin Franks, Ian Brieck (piano), Alexander Grant, Bobby Ray Simmons, Jr., Tim Sommers	Alex da Kid, DJ Frank E	
"Airplanes, Part II"	2010	B.o.B, Eminem, Hayley Williams	B.o.B Presents: The Adventures of Bobby Ray	Jeremy Dussolliet, Justin Franks, Alexander Grant, Marshall Mathers, Luis Resto, Bobby Ray Simmons, Jr., Tim Sommers	Alex da Kid, DJ Frank E, Luis Resto	
"Love the Way You Lie"	2010	Eminem, Rihanna	Recovery	Alexander Grant, Holly Hafermann, Marshall Mathers	Alex da Kid	
"Love the Way You Lie (Part II)"	2010	Rihanna, Eminem	Loud	Alexander Grant, Holly Hafermann, Marshall Mathers	Alex da Kid	
"Castle Walls"	2010	T.I., Christina Aguilera	No Mercy	Alexander Grant, Holly Hafermann, Clifford Harris	Alex da Kid	
"Coming Home"	2010	Diddy – Dirty Money, Skylar Grey	Last Train to Paris	Shawn Carter, Jermaine Cole, Alexander Grant, Holly Hafermann	Alex da Kid, Jay-Z	
"I Need a Doctor"	2011	Dr. Dre, Eminem, Skylar Grey	—N/a	Alexander Grant, Holly Hafermann, Marshall Mathers, Andre Young	Alex da Kid	
"Words I Never Said"	2011	Lupe Fiasco, Skylar Grey	Lasers	Alexander Grant, Holly Hafermann, Wasalu Jaco	Alex da Kid	
"Rise Above 1"	2011	Reeve Carney, Bono, The Edge	Spider-Man: Turn Off the Dark		Alex da Kid, Bono, The Edge	
"Dance Without You"	2011	Skylar Grey	—N/a	Alexander Grant, Holly Hafermann	Alex da Kid	
"Invisible"	2011	Skylar Grey	—N/a	Alexander Grant, Holly Hafermann, Robert Thomas	Alex da Kid	
"Farewell"	2011	Rihanna	Talk That Talk	Esther Dean, Alexander Grant	Alex da Kid	
"Love the Way You Lie, Pt. III (Original Demo)"	2012	Skylar Grey	The Buried Sessions of Skylar Grey	Alexander Grant, Holly Hafermann, Marshall Mathers	Alex da Kid	
"Coming Home, Pt. II"	2012	Skylar Grey	The Buried Sessions of Skylar Grey	Shawn Carter, Jermaine Cole, Alexander Grant, Holly Hafermann	Alex da Kid	
"Words"	2012	Skylar Grey	The Buried Sessions of Skylar Grey	Alexander Grant, Holly Hafermann	Alex da Kid	
"Radioactive"	2012	Imagine Dragons	Continued Silence	Alexander Grant, Benjamin McKee, Joshua Mosser, Daniel Reynolds, Wayne Sermon	Alex da Kid	
"Demons"	2012	Imagine Dragons	Continued Silence	Alexander Grant, Benjamin McKee, Joshua Mosser, Daniel Reynolds, Wayne Sermon	Alex da Kid	
"On Top of the World"	2012	Imagine Dragons	Continued Silence	Alexander Grant, Benjamin McKee, Daniel Reynolds, Wayne Sermon	Alex da Kid	
"Round and Round"	2012	Imagine Dragons	Continued Silence	Alexander Grant, Benjamin McKee, Daniel Reynolds, Wayne Sermon	Alex da Kid	
"Radioactive"	2012	Imagine Dragons	Night Visions	Alexander Grant, Benjamin McKee, Joshua Mosser, Daniel Reynolds, Wayne Sermon	Alex da Kid	
"Demons"	2012	Imagine Dragons	Night Visions	Alexander Grant, Benjamin McKee, Joshua Mosser, Daniel Reynolds, Wayne Sermon	Alex da Kid	
"On Top of the World"	2012	Imagine Dragons	Night Visions	Alexander Grant, Benjamin McKee, Daniel Reynolds, Wayne Sermon	Alex da Kid	
"Round and Round"	2012	Imagine Dragons	Night Visions	Alexander Grant, Benjamin McKee, Daniel Reynolds, Wayne Sermon	Alex da Kid	
"Bleeding Out"	2012	Imagine Dragons	Night Visions	Alexander Grant, Benjamin McKee, Joshua Mosser, Daniel Reynolds, Wayne Sermon	Alex da Kid	
"Beautiful Sinner"	2012	Nicki Minaj	Pink Friday: Roman Reloaded	Esther Dean, Alexander Grant, Onika Maraj	Alex da Kid	
"Under the Sun"	2012	Cheryl Cole	A Million Lights		Alex da Kid	
"Our House"	2012	Slaughterhouse, Eminem, Skylar Grey	Welcome to: Our House		Alex da Kid	
"Rescue Me"	2012	Slaughterhouse, Skylar Grey	Welcome to: Our House		Alex da Kid, Eminem	
"Lost Cause"	2012	Imagine Dragons	Frankenweenie Unleashed!		Alex da Kid	
"Building a Monster"	2012	Skylar Grey	Frankenweenie Unleashed!	Alexander Grant, Holly Hafermann	Alex da Kid	
"Invincible"	2012	MGK, Ester Dean	Lace Up	Richard Baker, Alexander Grant, Esther Dean	Alex da Kid	
"Lotus Intro"	2012	Christina Aguilera	Lotus		Alex da Kid, Dem Jointz	
"Make the World Move"	2012	Christina Aguilera, Cee Lo Green	Lotus		Alex da Kid, Mike Del Rio, Jayson DeZuzio	
"Cease Fire"	2012	Christina Aguilera	Lotus		Alex da Kid	
"Circles"	2012	Christina Aguilera	Lotus		Alex da Kid	
"Best of Me"	2012	Christina Aguilera	Lotus		Alex da Kid, Jayson DeZuzio	
"Light Up the Sky"	2012	Christina Aguilera	Lotus		Alex da Kid	
"Shut Up"	2012	Christina Aguilera	Lotus		Alex da Kid, Mike Del Rio, Nate Campany	
"Ready, Aim, Fire"	2013	Imagine Dragons	Iron Man 3: Heroes Fall (Music Inspired by the Motion Picture)	Dan Reynolds, Wayne Sermon, Ben McKee, Daniel Platzman, Alex Da Kid	Alex da Kid	
"Rumble and Sway"	2013	Jamie N Commons	Rumble and Sway EP		Alex da Kid	
"Wash Me in the Water"	2013	Jamie N Commons	Rumble and Sway EP		Alex da Kid	
"Worth Your While"	2013	Jamie N Commons	Rumble and Sway EP		Alex da Kid	
"Have a Little Faith"	2013	Jamie N Commons	Rumble and Sway EP		Alex da Kid	
"Caroline (Early Demo)"	2013	Jamie N Commons	Rumble and Sway EP		Alex da Kid	
"The Preacher"	2013	Jamie N Commons	Rumble and Sway EP		Alex da Kid	
"Final Warning"	2013	Skylar Grey	Don't Look Down	Holly Brook Haferman, Alex Da Kid	Alex da Kid	
"C'mon Let Me Ride" (featuring Eminem)	2013	Skylar Grey	Don't Look Down	Hafermann, Grant, Mike Del Rio, Marshall Mathers, Freddie Mercury	Alex da Kid	
"Sunshine"	2013	Skylar Grey	Don't Look Down	Hafermann, Grant, Jayson DeZuzio	Alex da Kid DeZuzio Hafermann	
"Glow in the Dark"	2013	Skylar Grey	Don't Look Down	Hafermann, Grant, Del Rio	Alex da Kid, Del Rio	
"Shit, Man!" (featuring Angel Haze)	2013	Skylar Grey	Don't Look Down	Hafermann Grant, DeZuzio, Raykeea Wilson	Alex da Kid, Dezuzio	
"Clear Blue Sky"	2013	Skylar Grey	Don't Look Down	Hafermann, Grant, Lauren Christy, Clare Maguire	Alex da Kid	
"Tower (Don't Look Down)"	2013	Skylar Grey	Don't Look Down	Hafermann, Grant	Alex da Kid	
"Unconsolable"	2013	X Ambassadors	Love Songs Drug Songs EP		Alex da Kid	
"Love Songs Drug Songs"	2013	X Ambassadors	Love Songs Drug Songs EP	Noah Feldshuh, Casey Harris, Sam Harris, Alex da Kid, Adam Levin	Alex da Kid	
"Down With Me"	2013	X Ambassadors	Love Songs Drug Songs EP		Alex da Kid	
"Stranger"	2013	X Ambassadors	Love Songs Drug Songs EP	Noah Feldshuh, Casey Harris, Sam Harris, Alex da Kid, Adam Levin, Dan Reynolds	Alex da Kid	
"Litost"	2013	X Ambassadors	Love Songs Drug Songs EP		Alex da Kid	
"Brother"	2013	X Ambassadors	Love Songs Drug Songs EP		Alex da Kid	
"(Don't Turn on Me) Warning You"	2013	50 Cent	—N/a	Alex da Kid, Holly Haferman, 50 Cent	Alex da Kid	
"Asshole"	2013	Eminem	The Marshall Mathers LP 2		Alex da Kid	
"Desperation"	2013	Eminem	The Marshall Mathers LP 2		Alex da Kid	
"Wicked Ways"	2013	Eminem	The Marshall Mathers LP 2		Alex da Kid	
"Witch Doctor"	2013	Tinie Tempah	Demonstration		Alex da Kid	
"Monster"	2013	Imagine Dragons	—N/a		Alex da Kid	
"Who We Are"	2013	Imagine Dragons	The Hunger Games: Catching Fire – Original Motion Picture Soundtrack		Alex da Kid	
"Free and Lonely"	2014	X Ambassadors	The Reason EP	Noah Feldshuh, Casey Harris, Sam Harris, Alex da Kid, Adam Levin	Alex da Kid	
"The Business"	2014	X Ambassadors	The Reason EP	Noah Feldshuh, Casey Harris, Sam Harris, Alex da Kid, Adam Levin	Alex da Kid	
"Giants"	2014	X Ambassadors	The Reason EP	Noah Feldshuh, Casey Harris, Sam Harris, Alex da Kid, Adam Levin	Alex da Kid	
"Unsteady"	2014	X Ambassadors	The Reason EP	Noah Feldshuh, Casey Harris, Sam Harris, Alex da Kid, Adam Levin	Alex da Kid	
"Shining"	2014	X Ambassadors	The Reason EP	Noah Feldshuh, Casey Harris, Sam Harris, Alex da Kid, Adam Levin	Alex da Kid	
"Jungle"	2014	X Ambassadors, Jamie N Commons	—N/a	Jamie N Commons, Sam Harris, Alex da Kid, Mike Del Rio	Alex da Kid	
"Jungle (Remix)" (featuring Jay-Z)	2014	X Ambassadors, Jamie N Commons	—N/a	Jamie N Commons, Sam Harris, Alex da Kid, Mike Del Rio, Sean Carter	Alex da Kid	
"Bed of Lies" (featuring Skylar Grey)	2014	Nicki Minaj, Skylar Grey	The Pinkprint	Nicki Minaj, Holly Hafermann, Alex da Kid	Alex da Kid	
"Gold"	2015	Imagine Dragons	Smoke + Mirrors	Dan Reynolds, Daniel Wayne Sermon, Ben McKee, Daniel Platzman, Alex da Kid	Alex da Kid	
"I Bet My Life"	2015	Imagine Dragons	Smoke + Mirrors	Dan Reynolds, Daniel Wayne Sermon, Ben McKee, Daniel Platzman, Alex da Kid	Alex da Kid	
"Yesterday"	2017	Imagine Dragons	EVOLVE	Dan Reynolds, Daniel Wayne Sermon, Ben McKee, Daniel Platzman, Alex da Kid, Jayson DeZuzio	Alex da Kid, Jayson DeZuzio	
Thunder"	2017	Imagine Dragons	EVOLVE	Dan Reynolds, Daniel Wayne Sermon, Ben McKee, Daniel Platzman, Alex da Kid, Jayson DeZuzio	Alex da Kid, Jayson DeZuzio	
Dancing in the Dark"	2017	Imagine Dragons	EVOLVE	Dan Reynolds, Daniel Wayne Sermon, Ben McKee, Daniel Platzman, Alex da Kid	Alex da Kid	
