= List of awards and nominations received by Imagine Dragons =

Imagine Dragons awards and nominations
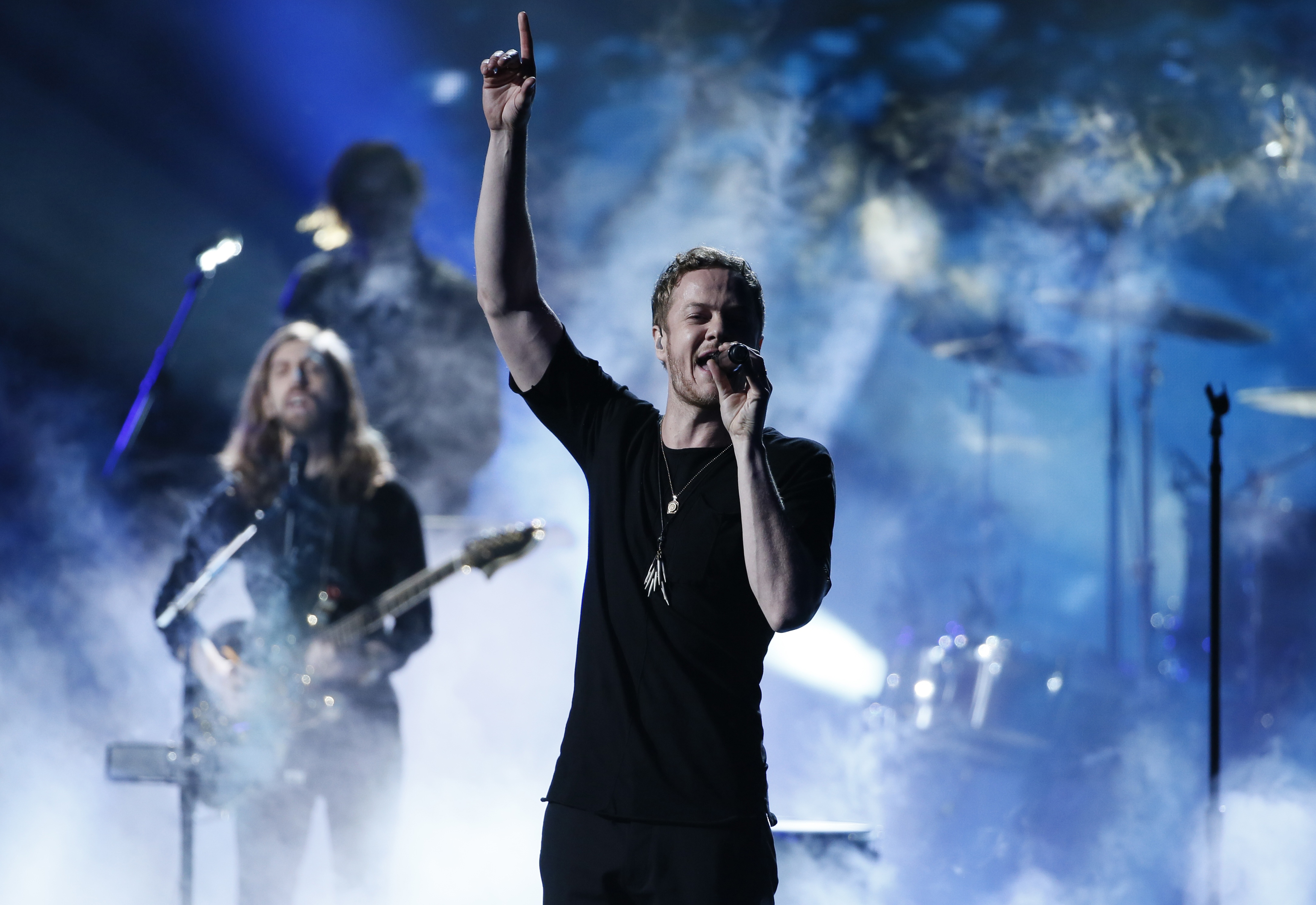
- Imagine Dragons performing at American Music Awards of 2013
Awards and nominations
Award	Wins	Nominations
American Music Awards	3	12
Billboard Music Awards	10	35
BMI Pop Music Awards	4	4
ECHO Music Awards	1	4
European Festival Awards	1	2
GAFFA Awards (Denmark)	0	4
Grammy Awards	1	4
iHeartRadio Music Awards	5	15
International Dance Music Awards	1	1
Juno Awards	0	1
Premios 40 Principales/LOS40 Music Awards	1	4
MTV Europe Music Awards	1	11
MTV Video Music Awards	1	12
mtvU Woodie Awards	0	2
MuchMusic Video Awards	3	6
Nickelodeon Kids' Choice Awards	1	7
NRJ Music Awards	2	3
People's Choice Awards	0	5
Pollstar Awards	1	1
Teen Choice Awards	5	16
UK Festival Awards	0	2
VEVO Hot This Year Awards	0	1
World Music Awards	1	4

Totals (Note: Certain award groups do not simply award one winner. They acknowledge several different recipients, have runners-up, and have third place. Since this is a specific recognition and is different from losing an award, runner-up mentions are considered wins in this award tally. For simplification and to avoid errors, each award in this list has been presumed to have had a prior nomination.)
- Wins: 57
- Nominations: 191

Imagine Dragons is an American pop rock band from Las Vegas, Nevada, consisting of lead vocalist Dan Reynolds, lead guitarist Wayne Sermon, bassist Ben McKee, and drummer Daniel Platzman. The band is the recipient of a Grammy Award, three American Music Awards, ten Billboard Music Awards, eight BMI Pop Music Awards, an Echo Award, a MTV Video Music Award, five Teen Choice Awards and a World Music Award.

The band's first studio album Night Visions was released in 2012. It debuted at number two on the Billboard 200 and was the fourth best-selling album in the US in 2013 with over 1.4 million copies sold for the year. The album received the 2014 Billboard Music Award for Top Rock Album and was nominated for the Juno Award for International Album of the Year. The second single from the album, "Radioactive", peaked at number three on the US Billboard Hot 100, and peaked at number one on the Billboard Hot Rock Songs. The single received various awards, including the Grammy Award for Best Rock Performance, the Teen Choice Award for Choice Music - Rock Song, the Billboard Music Award for Top Streaming Song (Audio) and was nominated for the MTV Video Music Award for Best Rock Video. During this era MTV called them "the year's biggest breakout band", Billboard named them their "Breakthrough Band of 2013" and placed them at the top of their "Year In Rock" rankings for 2013. Their second studio album, Smoke + Mirrors, reached number one in the US, Canada and the UK. and sold over one million copies worldwide. The band's third album, Evolve, became their third album to reach the top three on the Billboard 200 and was nominated for the Grammy Award for Best Pop Vocal Album. It spawned the singles, "Believer" and Thunder", which both went on to peak at number four on the Billboard Hot 100 and were nominated at the 2018 Billboard Music Award for Top Selling Song. Their fourth studio album, Origins, released in 2018, peaked at number one in Canada and reached the top ten in the US, Australia and the United Kingdom. The first single from the album, "Natural", peaked at number one on the Billboard Hot Rock Songs. The song received a Nickelodeon Kids' Choice Award nomination for Favorite Song and MTV Video Music Award nomination for Best Rock.

Imagine Dragons has received several Best Group nominations, including three at the People's Choice Awards, and won two NRJ Music Awards for International Group of the Year, and also was nominated two times at American Music Awards for Artist of the Year. Awarded 5 iHeartRadio Music Awards along with the accomplishment of reaching 1 Billion Total Audience Spins for "Thunder" & "Believer". The band has received a total of 52 awards and 190 nominations.

== Awards and nominations ==
Award	Year	Recipient(s)	Category	Result	Ref.
Alt Rock Awards	2014	Into The Night Tour	Tour of the Year	Won	
Alt Rock Awards	2018	Imagine Dragons	Band of the Year	Won	
American Music Awards	2013	Imagine Dragons	New Artist of the Year	Nominated	
American Music Awards	2013	Imagine Dragons	Favorite Pop/Rock Band, Duo or Group	Nominated	
American Music Awards	2013	Imagine Dragons	Favorite Alternative Artist	Won	
American Music Awards	2014	Imagine Dragons	Artist of the Year	Nominated	
American Music Awards	2014	Imagine Dragons	Favorite Pop/Rock Band, Duo or Group	Nominated	
American Music Awards	2014	Imagine Dragons	Favorite Alternative Artist	Won	
American Music Awards	2017	Imagine Dragons	Favorite Pop/Rock Band, Duo or Group	Won	
American Music Awards	2017	Imagine Dragons	Favorite Alternative Artist	Nominated	
American Music Awards	2018	Imagine Dragons	Artist of the Year	Nominated	
American Music Awards	2018	Imagine Dragons	Favorite Pop/Rock Band, Duo or Group	Nominated	
American Music Awards	2018	Imagine Dragons	Favorite Alternative Artist	Nominated	
American Music Awards	2019	Imagine Dragons	Favorite Alternative Artist	Nominated	
American Music Awards	2022	Imagine Dragons	Favorite Pop Duo or Group	Nominated	
American Music Awards	2022	Imagine Dragons	Favorite Rock Artist	Nominated	
American Music Awards	2022	"Enemy"	Favorite Rock Song	Nominated	
American Music Awards	2022	Mercury – Act 1	Favorite Rock Album	Nominated	
ARIA Music Awards	2018	Evolve	Best International Artist	Nominated	
The Arthur Awards	2026	Loom World Tour	The Top Tour Award	Nominated	
Billboard Music Awards	2014	Imagine Dragons	Top Artist	Nominated	
Billboard Music Awards	2014	Imagine Dragons	Top Duo/Group	Won	
Billboard Music Awards	2014	Imagine Dragons	Top Hot 100 Artist	Won	
Billboard Music Awards	2014	Imagine Dragons	Top Radio Songs Artist	Nominated	
Billboard Music Awards	2014	Imagine Dragons	Top Digital Songs Artist	Nominated	
Billboard Music Awards	2014	Imagine Dragons	Top Streaming Artist	Nominated	
Billboard Music Awards	2014	Imagine Dragons	Top Rock Artist	Won	
Billboard Music Awards	2014	Imagine Dragons	Milestone Award	Nominated	
Billboard Music Awards	2014	Night Visions	Top Rock Album	Won	
Billboard Music Awards	2014	"Radioactive"	Top Hot 100 Song	Nominated	
Billboard Music Awards	2014	"Radioactive"	Top Digital Song	Nominated	
Billboard Music Awards	2014	"Radioactive"	Top Streaming Song (Audio)	Won	
Billboard Music Awards	2014	"Radioactive"	Top Rock Song	Nominated	
Billboard Music Awards	2014	"Demons"	Top Rock Song	Nominated	
Billboard Music Awards	2017	"Sucker for Pain" (w/ Lil Wayne, Wiz Khalifa, Logic & Ty Dolla Sign)	Top Rock Song	Nominated	
Billboard Music Awards	2018	Imagine Dragons	Top Duo/Group	Won	
Billboard Music Awards	2018	Imagine Dragons	Top Hot 100 Artist	Nominated	
Billboard Music Awards	2018	Imagine Dragons	Top Song Sales Artist	Nominated	
Billboard Music Awards	2018	Imagine Dragons	Top Radio Songs Artist	Nominated	
Billboard Music Awards	2018	Imagine Dragons	Top Rock Artist	Won	
Billboard Music Awards	2018	Evolve	Top Rock Album	Won	
Billboard Music Awards	2018	"Believer"	Top Selling Song	Nominated	
Billboard Music Awards	2018	"Believer"	Top Radio Song	Nominated	
Billboard Music Awards	2018	"Believer"	Top Rock Song	Won	
Billboard Music Awards	2018	"Thunder"	Top Selling Song	Nominated	
Billboard Music Awards	2018	"Thunder"	Top Rock Song	Nominated	
Billboard Music Awards	2019	Imagine Dragons	Top Duo/Group	Nominated	
Billboard Music Awards	2019	Imagine Dragons	Top Song Sales Artist	Nominated	
Billboard Music Awards	2019	Imagine Dragons	Top Rock Artist	Won	
Billboard Music Awards	2019	Origins	Top Rock Album	Nominated	
Billboard Music Awards	2019	"Natural"	Top Rock Song	Nominated	
Billboard Music Awards	2019	"Whatever It Takes"	Top Rock Song	Nominated	
Billboard Music Awards	2020	Imagine Dragons	Top Rock Artist	Nominated	
Billboard Music Awards	2020	"Bad Liar"	Top Rock Song	Nominated	
Billboard Music Awards	2022	Imagine Dragons	Top Duo/Group	Nominated	
Billboard Music Awards	2022	Imagine Dragons	Top Rock Artist	Nominated	
Billboard Music Awards	2022	Mercury – Act 1	Top Rock Album	Nominated	
Billboard Music Awards	2022	"Follow You"	Top Rock Song	Nominated	
Billboard Live Music Awards	2015	Imagine Dragons	Concert Marketing & Promotion Award	Won	
BMI Pop Awards	2014	"It's Time"	Award-Winning Songs	Won	
BMI Pop Awards	2014	"Radioactive"	Award-Winning Songs	Won	
BMI Pop Awards	2015	"Demons"	Award-Winning Songs	Won	
BMI Pop Awards	2016	"I Bet My Life"	Award-Winning Songs	Won	
BMI Pop Awards	2018	"Believer"	Award-Winning Songs	Won	
BMI Pop Awards	2019	"Believer"	Award-Winning Songs	Won	
BMI Pop Awards	2019	"Natural"	Award-Winning Songs	Won	
BMI Pop Awards	2019	"Thunder"	Award-Winning Songs	Won	
Echo Awards	2018	Imagine Dragons	International Band of the Year	Won	
Echo Awards	2018	"Thunder"	International Hit of the Year	Nominated	
European Festival Awards	2013	Imagine Dragons	Newcomer of the Year	Won	
European Festival Awards	2014	Imagine Dragons	Best Headliner	Nominated	
GAFFA Awards Denmark (Prisen)	2015	Imagine Dragons	International Band of the Year	Nominated	
GAFFA Awards Denmark (Prisen)	2018	Imagine Dragons	International Band of the Year	Nominated	
GAFFA Awards Denmark (Prisen)	2018	Evolve	International Album of the Year	Nominated	
GAFFA Awards Denmark (Prisen)	2019	Imagine Dragons	International Band of the Year	Nominated	
Grammy Awards	2014	"Radioactive"	Record of the Year	Nominated	
Grammy Awards	2014	"Radioactive"	Best Rock Performance	Won	
Grammy Awards	2018	Evolve	Best Pop Vocal Album	Nominated	
Grammy Awards	2018	"Thunder"	Best Pop Duo/Group Performance	Nominated	
iHeartRadio Music Awards	2014	Imagine Dragons	Artist of the Year	Nominated	
iHeartRadio Music Awards	2014	Imagine Dragons	Best New Artist	Nominated	
iHeartRadio Music Awards	2014	"Radioactive"	Song of the Year	Nominated	
iHeartRadio Music Awards	2014	"Demons"	Alternative Rock Song of the Year	Won	
iHeartRadio Music Awards	2018	Imagine Dragons	Best Duo/Group of the Year	Nominated	
iHeartRadio Music Awards	2018	Imagine Dragons	Alternative Rock Artist of the Year	Won	
iHeartRadio Music Awards	2018	Evolve	Alternative Rock Album of the Year	Won	
iHeartRadio Music Awards	2018	"Believer"	Alternative Rock Song of the Year	Nominated	
iHeartRadio Music Awards	2018	"Thunder"	Alternative Rock Song of the Year	Nominated	
iHeartRadio Music Awards	2019	Imagine Dragons	Best Duo/Group of the Year	Nominated	
iHeartRadio Music Awards	2019	Imagine Dragons	Alternative Rock Artist of the Year	Won	
iHeartRadio Music Awards	2019	Imagine Dragons	Most Thumbed-Up Artist of the Year	Won	
iHeartRadio Music Awards	2019	"Natural"	Alternative Rock Song of the Year	Nominated	
iHeartRadio Music Awards	2020	Imagine Dragons	Best Duo/Group of the Year	Nominated	
iHeartRadio Music Awards	2020	Imagine Dragons	Alternative Rock Artist of the Year	Nominated	
iHeartRadio Music Awards	2023	"Enemy (from the series Arcane League of Legends)"	Song of the Year	Won	
iHeartRadio Music Awards	2023	Imagine Dragons	Best Duo/Group of the Year	Won	
iHeartRadio Titanium Award	2017	"Believer"	1 Billion Total Audience Spins on iHeartRadio Stations	Won	
iHeartRadio Titanium Award	2018	"Thunder"	1 Billion Total Audience Spins on iHeartRadio Stations	Won	
International Dance Music Awards	2014	"Radioactive"	Best Alternative/Indie Rock Dance Track	Won	
Los40 Music Awards	2013	Imagine Dragons	Best International Rock Band	Won	
Los40 Music Awards	2017	Evolve	International Album of the Year	Nominated	
Los40 Music Awards	2021	Imagine Dragons	Best International Act	Nominated	
Los40 Music Awards	2021	Imagine Dragons	Best International Live Act	Nominated	
Los40 Music Awards	2022	Imagine Dragons	Best International Act	Nominated	
Los40 Music Awards	2022	Imagine Dragons	Best International Live Act	Nominated	
Los40 Music Awards	2022	Mercury – Acts 1 & 2	Best International Album	Nominated	
Los40 Music Awards	2022	"Enemy"	Best International Song	Won	
Lunas del Auditorio	2015	Imagine Dragons	Best Foreign Rock	Nominated	
MTV Europe Music Awards	2013	Imagine Dragons	Best New Act	Nominated	
MTV Europe Music Awards	2013	Imagine Dragons	Best Push Act	Nominated	
MTV Europe Music Awards	2014	Imagine Dragons	Best Rock	Nominated	
MTV Europe Music Awards	2014	Imagine Dragons	Best World Stage Performance	Nominated	
MTV Europe Music Awards	2017	Imagine Dragons	Best Alternative	Nominated	
MTV Europe Music Awards	2018	Imagine Dragons	Best Rock	Nominated	
MTV Europe Music Awards	2018	Imagine Dragons	Best US Act	Nominated	
MTV Europe Music Awards	2019	Imagine Dragons	Best Rock	Nominated	
MTV Europe Music Awards	2021	Imagine Dragons	Best Group	Nominated	
MTV Europe Music Awards	2021	Imagine Dragons	Best Rock	Nominated	
MTV Europe Music Awards	2024	Imagine Dragons	Best Alternative	Won	
MTV Italian Music Awards	2015	Imagine Dragons	Best Band	Nominated	
MTV Millennial Awards	2018	"Whatever It Takes"	Global Hit	Nominated	
MTV Video Music Awards	2012	"It's Time"	Best Rock Video	Nominated	
MTV Video Music Awards	2013	"Radioactive"	Best Rock Video	Nominated	
MTV Video Music Awards	2014	"Demons"	Best Rock Video	Nominated	
MTV Video Music Awards	2017	"Thunder"	Best Cinematography	Nominated	
MTV Video Music Awards	2018	"Whatever It Takes"	Best Rock	Won	
MTV Video Music Awards	2019	"Natural"	Best Rock	Nominated	
MTV Video Music Awards	2021	"Follow You"	Best Alternative	Nominated	
MTV Video Music Awards	2022	"Enemy"	Best Alternative	Nominated	
MTV Video Music Awards	2022	Imagine Dragons	Group of the Year	Nominated	
MTV Video Music Awards	2023	"Crushed"	Video for Good	Nominated	
MTV Video Music Awards	2024	Imagine Dragons	Best Group	Nominated	
MTV Video Music Awards	2025	Imagine Dragons	Best Group	Nominated	
MTV Video Music Awards Japan	2015	"I Bet My Life"	Best International Group Video	Nominated	
MTV Woodie Awards	2015	Imagine Dragons	Woodie of the Year	Nominated	
MTV Woodie Awards	2015	"Radioactive" (Kendrick Lamar Remix)	Best Collaboration Woodie	Nominated	
Nickelodeon Kids' Choice Awards	2015	Imagine Dragons	Favorite Music Group	Nominated	
Nickelodeon Kids' Choice Awards	2016	Imagine Dragons	Favorite Music Group	Nominated	
Nickelodeon Kids' Choice Awards	2018	Imagine Dragons	Favorite Music Group	Nominated	
Nickelodeon Kids' Choice Awards	2018	"Thunder"	Favorite Song	Nominated	
Nickelodeon Kids' Choice Awards	2019	Imagine Dragons	Favorite Music Group	Nominated	
Nickelodeon Kids' Choice Awards	2019	"Natural"	Favorite Song	Nominated	
Nickelodeon Kids' Choice Awards	2024	Imagine Dragons	Favorite Music Group	Won	
NRJ Music Awards	2014	Imagine Dragons	International Duo/Group of the Year	Nominated	
NRJ Music Awards	2017	Imagine Dragons	International Duo/Group of the Year	Won	
NRJ Music Awards	2018	Imagine Dragons	International Duo/Group of the Year	Won	
NRJ Music Awards	2021	Imagine Dragons	International Duo/Group of the Year	Nominated	
NRJ Music Awards	2021	"Follow You"	International Song of the Year	Nominated	
People's Choice Awards	2014	Imagine Dragons	Favorite Breakout Artist	Nominated	
People's Choice Awards	2014	Imagine Dragons	Favorite Band/Group	Nominated	
People's Choice Awards	2014	Imagine Dragons	Favorite Alternative/Rock Band	Nominated	
People's Choice Awards	2014	"Radioactive"	Favorite Song	Nominated	
People's Choice Awards	2015	Imagine Dragons	Favorite Band/Group	Nominated	
People's Choice Awards	2016	Imagine Dragons	Favorite Band/Group	Nominated	
People's Choice Awards	2016	Smoke + Mirrors	Favorite Album	Nominated	
People's Choice Awards	2019	Imagine Dragons	Group of the Year	Nominated	
People's Choice Awards	2022	Imagine Dragons	Group of 2022	Nominated	
Pollstar Awards	2014	Imagine Dragons	Best New Touring Artist	Won	
Radio Disney Music Awards	2018	Imagine Dragons	Best Music Group	Nominated	
Spotify Awards	2020	Imagine Dragons	Most Popular Contemporary Rock Artist	Won	
Swiss Music Awards	2015	Imagine Dragons	Best International Breaking Act	Won	
Swiss Music Awards	2018	Imagine Dragons	Best International Group	Won	
Swiss Music Awards	2019	Imagine Dragons	Best International Group	Won	
Swiss Music Awards	2022	Imagine Dragons	Best International Group	Won	
Teen Choice Awards	2013	Imagine Dragons	Choice Music – Rock Group	Nominated	
Teen Choice Awards	2013	Imagine Dragons	Choice Music – Breakout Group	Nominated	
Teen Choice Awards	2013	Imagine Dragons	Choice Summer Music Star – Group	Nominated	
Teen Choice Awards	2013	"Radioactive"	Choice Music – Rock Song	Won	
Teen Choice Awards	2014	Imagine Dragons	Choice Music – Rock Group	Won	
Teen Choice Awards	2014	"On Top of the World"	Choice Music – Rock Song	Nominated	
Teen Choice Awards	2015	Imagine Dragons	Choice Music Group – Male	Nominated	
Teen Choice Awards	2015	"I Bet My Life"	Choice Music – Rock Song	Nominated	
Teen Choice Awards	2017	Imagine Dragons	Choice Rock Artist	Nominated	
Teen Choice Awards	2017	Imagine Dragons	Choice Summer Group	Nominated	
Teen Choice Awards	2017	"Believer"	Choice Song – Group	Nominated	
Teen Choice Awards	2017	"Believer"	Choice Rock/Alternative Song	Won	
Teen Choice Awards	2018	Imagine Dragons	Choice Rock Artist	Won	
Teen Choice Awards	2018	Imagine Dragons	Choice Summer Group	Nominated	
Teen Choice Awards	2018	"Whatever It Takes"	Choice Song – Group	Nominated	
Teen Choice Awards	2018	"Whatever It Takes"	Choice Rock/Alternative Song	Won	
UK Festival Awards	2013	Imagine Dragons	Breakout Act of the Year	Nominated	
UK Festival Awards	2013	"Radioactive"	Anthem of the Summer	Nominated	
UK Music Video Awards	2016	Smoke & Mirrors Live	Best Live Coverage	Nominated	
UK Music Video Awards	2022	"Sharks"	Best Rock Video - International	Nominated	
World Music Awards	2013	Imagine Dragons	World's Best Group	Nominated	
World Music Awards	2013	Imagine Dragons	World's Best Rock Act	Won	
World Music Awards	2013	Imagine Dragons	World's Best Live Act	Nominated	
World Music Awards	2013	"Demons"	World's Best Video	Nominated	
World Music Awards	2013	"It's Time"	World's Best Video	Nominated	
World Music Awards	2013	"Radioactive"	World's Best Video	Nominated	
ZD Awards	2018	Evolve World Tour	Tour of the Year	Won	
