= Smoke + Mirrors Tour =

2015–16 concert tour by Imagine Dragons

- World tour by Imagine Dragons
- Promotional poster for the tour
- Location: Asia; Europe; North America; Oceania; South America
- Associated album: Smoke + Mirrors
- Start date: April 12, 2015
- End date: February 5, 2016
- No. of shows: 109
- Supporting acts: The Mills; Vivanativa; Odiesso; Metric; Halsey; British India; The Rubens; Sunset Sons; Pravada; The Biebers; GJan; Lemon

Imagine Dragons concert chronology
- Night Visions Tour (2013–14); Smoke + Mirrors Tour (2015–16); Evolve World Tour (2017–19)

The Smoke + Mirrors Tour was the second worldwide concert tour by American alternative rock band Imagine Dragons in support of their second studio album Smoke + Mirrors (2015). The tour had a preview show in Sydney, Australia, on March 17, 2015, before the tour officially began in Santiago, Chile, on April 12, 2015. It continued through the Americas, Asia, Oceania and Europe until February 5, 2016, in Amsterdam, Netherlands. The band played 108 shows. For Pollstar's Year End Top 200 North American Tours of 2015, it was ranked forty-first, and grossed $25.2 million.

== Background and development ==
In 2012, Imagine Dragons released their debut studio album Night Visions, which launched the band into international mainstream commercial success. To promote the record, the band embarked on a world tour, named Night Visions Tour, consisting of over 170 shows all over the world. During this tour, the band had been working for their second album.

On December 16, 2014, Imagine Dragons announced that their second album Smoke + Mirrors would be released on February 17, 2015 and the tour was announced shortly later.

The arena tour in United Kingdom was announced on January 30, 2015. On the same day, the rest of the European leg was revealed through the band official Facebook with "more dates to come on". The North American leg was announced a week later, meanwhile the shows in Australia and New Zealand were confirmed in middle February.

The show that took place in Toronto, Ontario on July 4, was recorded and released as a concert DVD, Imagine Dragons: Smoke + Mirrors Live.

== Critical reception ==
=== North America ===
The concert at the Nationwide Arena in Columbus received a positive review from Curtis Schieber from The Columbus Dispatch, saying that whilst "no wheels were reinvented during the Imagine Dragons concert" he acknowledged that it "delivered all its considerable drama with bull's-eye accuracy in a very appealing package that featured a charismatic lead singer, an expert four-piece band [...] and a relatively restrained set that looked like a million bucks and skilfully built momentum." Gene Stout of The Seattle Times have a generally positive review of the concert at the Tacoma Dome in Tacoma, stating that "high-powered songs as 'On Top of the World', 'Radioactive' and the drum-laden 'I Bet My Life' were a bit overdone. But fans loved them." Stout noted that the "concertgoers spanned generations, from kids attending their first concert to middle-aged rockers who discovered the band in Vegas" as well as complimenting the opening acts, Metric and Halsey, calling them a "bonus".

=== Oceania ===
George Palathingal of The Sydney Morning Herald gave the show at the Qantas Credit Union Arena in Sydney four stars, summing up that "these Dragons do indeed breathe some fire". He also commented "I'm So Sorry" and "Friction" as highlights, with the latter dispelling "fears that Imagine Dragons might be a bit too "pop" and not nearly "rock" enough". Rachel Bache of The New Zealand Herald gave the concert at the Vector Arena in Auckland a positive review said from the opening of "Shots" the band "oozed energy", whilst also saying that the "bright white strobes did get a bit much".

== Opening acts ==
- The Mills (April 21, 2015)
- Vivanativa (April 23, 2015)
- Odiesso (April 27, 2015)
- Metric (June 3 – August 1, 2015)
- Halsey (June 3 – August 1, 2015)
- British India (September 2 – 5, 2015)
- The Rubens (September 8 & 10, 2015)
- Sunset Sons (October 11, 2015 – January 30, 2016 & February 5, 2016)
- Pravada (January 24 & 26, 2016)
- The Biebers (January 20, 2016)
- GJan (January 31, 2016)
- Lemon (February 2, 2016)

== Set list ==
This set list is representative of the performance on July 4, 2015, in Toronto, Ontario, Canada. It does not represent all concerts for the duration of the tour.

1. "Shots"
2. "Trouble"
3. "It's Time"
4. "Forever Young" (Alphaville cover)
5. "Smoke and Mirrors"
6. "Polaroid"
7. "I'm So Sorry"
8. "Thief"
9. "Gold"
10. "Bleeding Out" / "Warriors"
11. "Demons"
12. "Amsterdam"
13. "Hopeless Opus"
14. "On Top of the World"
15. "Friction"
16. "Release"
17. "I Bet My Life"
18. "Radioactive"

Encore

19. "The Fall"

== Tour dates ==
List of 2015 concerts
Date	City	Country	Venue
April 12, 2015	Santiago	Chile	Movistar Arena
April 14, 2015	Buenos Aires	Argentina	Tecnópolis
April 16, 2015	Rio de Janeiro	Brazil	Citibank Hall
April 18, 2015	São Paulo	Brazil	Arena Anhembi
April 21, 2015	Bogotá	Colombia	Simón Bolívar Park
April 23, 2015	San Juan	Puerto Rico	José Miguel Agrelot Coliseum
April 25, 2015 (Note: The April 25, 2015 concert in Monterrey is part of the Pa'l Norte Festival.)	Monterrey	Mexico	Fundidora Park
April 27, 2015	Mexico City	Mexico	Palacio de los Deportes
May 24, 2015 (Note: The May 24, 2015 concert in Norwich at is part of Radio 1's Big Weekend.)	Norwich	England	Earlham Park
May 29, 2015 (Note: The May 29, 2015 concert in Napa at is part of BottleRock Napa Valley Festival.)	Napa	United States	Napa Valley Expo
June 3, 2015	Portland	United States	Moda Center
June 5, 2015	Calgary	Canada	Scotiabank Saddledome
June 6, 2015	Edmonton	Canada	Rexall Place
June 8, 2015	Winnipeg	Canada	MTS Centre
June 9, 2015	St. Paul	United States	Xcel Energy Center
June 10, 2015	Omaha	United States	CenturyLink Center Omaha
June 12, 2015	St. Louis	United States	Scottrade Center
June 13, 2015	Milwaukee	United States	BMO Harris Bradley Center
June 15, 2015	Rosemont	United States	Allstate Arena
June 16, 2015	Louisville	United States	KFC Yum! Center
June 18, 2015	Columbus	United States	Nationwide Arena
June 19, 2015	Pittsburgh	United States	Consol Energy Center
June 22, 2015	Cleveland	United States	Quicken Loans Arena
June 23, 2015	Auburn Hills	United States	The Palace of Auburn Hills
June 24, 2015	Buffalo	United States	First Niagara Center
June 27, 2015	Philadelphia	United States	Wells Fargo Center
June 29, 2015	Newark	United States	Prudential Center
June 30, 2015	Brooklyn	United States	Barclays Center
July 1, 2015	Boston	United States	TD Garden
July 3, 2015	Montreal	Canada	Bell Centre
July 4, 2015	Toronto	Canada	Air Canada Centre
July 6, 2015	Washington, D.C.	United States	Verizon Center
July 7, 2015	Charlotte	United States	Time Warner Cable Arena
July 8, 2015	Nashville	United States	Bridgestone Arena
July 10, 2015	Tampa	United States	Amalie Arena
July 11, 2015	Sunrise	United States	BB&T Center
July 13, 2015	Memphis	United States	FedExForum
July 14, 2015	Atlanta	United States	Philips Arena
July 16, 2015	Houston	United States	Toyota Center
July 17, 2015	Dallas	United States	American Airlines Center
July 18, 2015	Lake Tahoe	United States	Harveys Outdoor Arena
July 20, 2015	Anaheim	United States	Honda Center
July 21, 2015	San Diego	United States	Viejas Arena
July 24, 2015	Inglewood	United States	The Forum
July 25, 2015	Phoenix	United States	Talking Stick Resort Arena
July 27, 2015	Denver	United States	Pepsi Center
July 28, 2015	Salt Lake City	United States	EnergySolutions Arena
July 30, 2015	Vancouver	Canada	Rogers Arena
July 31, 2015	Tacoma	United States	Tacoma Dome
August 1, 2015	Boise	United States	Taco Bell Arena
August 13, 2015	Seoul	South Korea	Olympic Gymnastics Arena
August 15, 2015 (Note: The August 15 and 16, 2016 concerts in Osaka and Chiba are part of Summer Sonic Festival.)	Osaka	Japan	Maishima Sports Island
August 16, 2015	Chiba	Japan	Chiba Marine Stadium
August 19, 2015	Shanghai	China	Shanghai Indoor Stadium
August 21, 2015	Taipei	Taiwan	Taipei Nangang Exhibition Center
August 23, 2015	Hong Kong	China	AsiaWorld–Arena
August 25, 2015	Singapore		Singapore Indoor Stadium
August 27, 2015	Pasay	Philippines	Mall of Asia Arena
August 29, 2015	Bangkok	Thailand	IMPACT Arena
September 2, 2015	Melbourne	Australia	Margaret Court Arena
September 4, 2015	Sydney	Australia	Qantas Union Credit Arena
September 5, 2015	Brisbane	Australia	Riverstage
September 8, 2015	Auckland	New Zealand	Vector Arena
September 10, 2015	Christchurch	New Zealand	Horncastle Arena
September 19, 2015 (Note: The September 15, 2015 concert in Cgicago at is part of Farm Aid.)	Chicago	United States	FirstMerit Bank Pavilion
September 26, 2015 (Note: The September 16, 2015 concert in Las Vegas at is part of Life Is Beautiful.)	Las Vegas	United States	Fremont Street
October 11, 2015	Oberhausen	Germany	König Pilsener Arena
October 12, 2015	Mannheim	Germany	SAP Arena
October 13, 2015	Munich	Germany	Olympiahalle
October 15, 2015	Hamburg	Germany	Barclaycard Arena
October 16, 2015	Berlin	Germany	Max-Schmeling-Halle
October 17, 2015	Stuttgart	Germany	Porsche-Arena
October 19, 2015	Copenhagen	Denmark	Forum Copenhagen
October 20, 2015	Oslo	Norway	Oslo Spektrum
October 21, 2015	Stockholm	Sweden	Ericsson Globe
October 24, 2015	Brussels	Belgium	Forest National
October 26, 2015	Lyon	France	Halle Tony Garnier
October 27, 2015	Lille	France	Zénith de Lille
October 28, 2015	Strasbourg	France	Zénith de Strasbourg
October 30, 2015	Madrid	Spain	Barclaycard Center
October 31, 2015	Bilbao	Spain	Bizkaia Arena
November 2, 2015	Paris	France	Le Zénith
November 4, 2015	London	England	The O_{2} Arena
November 5, 2015	London	England	The O_{2} Arena
November 6, 2015	Nottingham	England	Capital FM Arena
November 10, 2015	Leeds	England	First Direct Arena
November 11, 2015	Cardiff	Wales	Motorpoint Arena Cardiff
November 13, 2015	Manchester	England	Manchester Arena
November 14, 2015	Newcastle	England	Metro Radio Arena
November 15, 2015	Glasgow	Scotland	The SSE Hydro
November 17, 2015	Belfast	Northern Ireland	Odyssey Arena
November 18, 2015	Dublin	Ireland	3Arena
November 20, 2015	Birmingham	England	Barclaycard Arena
November 23, 2015	Milan	Italy	Mediolanum Forum
November 24, 2015	Zürich	Switzerland	Hallenstadion

List of 2016 concerts
Date	City	Country	Venue
January 14, 2016	Esch-sur-Alzette	Luxembourg	Rockhal
January 16, 2016	Prague	Czech Republic	O_{2} Arena
January 18, 2016	Vienna	Austria	Gasometer
January 19, 2016	Bratislava	Slovakia	Aegon Arena
January 20, 2016	Budapest	Hungary	Budapest Sports Arena
January 22, 2016	Minsk	Belarus	Čyžoŭka-Arena
January 24, 2016	Moscow	Russia	Olimpiyskiy
January 26, 2016	Saint Petersburg	Russia	Ice Palace Saint Petersburg
January 27, 2016	Helsinki	Finland	Hartwall Areena
January 29, 2016	Tallinn	Estonia	Saku Suurhall Arena
January 30, 2016	Riga	Latvia	Arena Riga
January 31, 2016	Vilnius	Lithuania	Siemens Arena
February 2, 2016	Łódź	Poland	Atlas Arena
February 5, 2016	Amsterdam	Netherlands	Ziggo Dome

=== Boxscores ===
List of reported boxscores, showing city, venue, attendance and gross revenue
City	Venue	Attendance	Gross revenue
San Juan	Coliseo de Jose Miguel Agrelot	7,174 / 7,174 (100%)	$579,860
Auburn Hills	Palace of Auburn Hills	10,650 / 10,650 (100%)	$608,130
Philadelphia	Wells Fargo Center	13,637 / 13,637 (100%)	$804,257
Newark	Prudential Center	11,464 / 11,683 (98%)	$581,428
Brooklyn	Barclays Center	12,598 / 12,598 (100%)	$743,850
Montreal	Bell Centre	15,601 / 15,601 (100%)	$718,606
Toronto	Air Canada Centre	14,899 / 14,899 (100%)	$692,691
Washington, D.C.	Verizon Center	11,179 / 14,205 (78%)	$661,696
Nashville	Bridgestone Arena	11,959 / 12,784 (93%)	$501,155
Houston	Toyota Center	11,064 / 11,165 (99%)	$617,771
Dallas	American Airlines Center	11,142 / 12,090 (92%)	$596,471
Lake Tahoe	Harveys Outdoor Arena	6,125 / 6,125 (100%)	$512,448
Melbourne	Margaret Court Arena	5,728 / 6,202 (92%)	$334,624
Sydney	Qantas Credit Union Arena	7,001 / 7,602 (92%)	$405,486
Brisbane	Riverstage	5,385 / 8,000 (67%)	$281,347
Hamburg	Barclaycard Arena	7,426 / 9,797 (75%)	$321,110
Brussels	Vorst Nationaal	8,388 / 8,400 (99%)	$285,899
London	O_{2} Arena	29,151 / 35,596 (81%)	$1,468,620
Manchester	Manchester Arena	13,311 / 14,687 (90%)	$607,365
Glasgow	SSE Hydro	12,542 / 12,712 (98%)	$572,950
Zürich	Hallenstadion	13,000 / 13,000 (100%)	$877,482
