= I'm So Sorry =

Promotional single by Imagine Dragons

from the album Smoke + Mirrors
- Released: February 17, 2015
- Recorded: 2014
- Studio: Imagine Dragons Studio, Las Vegas, Nevada
- Genre: Garage rock; blues rock
- Length: 3:50
- Label: KIDinaKORNER; Interscope
- Songwriters: Ben McKee; Daniel Platzman; Dan Reynolds; Wayne Sermon
- Producer: Imagine Dragons

Imagine Dragons promotional singles chronology
"Smoke and Mirrors" (2015)	"I'm So Sorry" (2015)	"Walking the Wire" (2017)

"I'm So Sorry" is a song by American rock band Imagine Dragons. The song serves as the second promotional single and fourth track from the band's second studio album Smoke + Mirrors (2015). Along with the songs "Hopeless Opus" and "Gold" on Smoke + Mirrors, the song touches upon lead-singer Dan Reynolds' depression struggles. The song has peaked at number 14 on the Billboard Hot Rock Songs chart.

== Critical reception ==
The song has been compared to the work of the Black Keys by music critics, with Mikael Wood of the Los Angeles Times comparing the song to the Black Keys' "fuzzy garage blues" sound, Jon Dolan of Rolling Stone describing the song as a "Black Keys-indebted garage-blues grinder", and Stephen Thomas Erlewine of AllMusic calling the song "a Black Keys number stripped of any sense of R&B groove".

== Track listing ==
Digital download
No.	Title	Writer(s)	Producer(s)	Length
1.	"I'm So Sorry"	Ben McKee; Daniel Platzman; Dan Reynolds; Wayne Sermon	Imagine Dragons	3:50

== Re-recordings and media usage ==
The song was sampled for the tracks "The Arrival of Kai", "The Hall of Heroes", "The Legend of Kai", "Po Belongs", "Kai is Closer", "The Battle of Legends", and "The Spirit Realm" in the Kung Fu Panda 3 (soundtrack).

It was also featured in the video game NBA 2K16 on DJ Mustard's Playlist.

== Chart performance ==
=== Weekly charts ===
Weekly chart performance for "I'm So Sorry"
Chart (2015)	Peak position
US Hot Rock & Alternative Songs (Billboard)	14

=== Year-end charts ===
Year-end chart performance for "I'm So Sorry"
Chart (2015)	Position
US Hot Rock Songs (Billboard)	97

== Certifications ==
Certifications for "I'm So Sorry"
Region	Certification	Certified units/sales
Brazil (Pro-Música Brasil)	Platinum	60,000^{‡}
New Zealand (RMNZ)	Gold	15,000^{‡}
United Kingdom (BPI)	Silver	200,000^{‡}
United States (RIAA)	Platinum	1,000,000^{‡}
^{‡} Sales+streaming figures based on certification alone.
