= Who We Are (Imagine Dragons song) =

Song by Imagine Dragons

from the album The Hunger Games: Catching Fire – Original Motion Picture Soundtrack and Smoke + Mirrors (Super deluxe)
- Released: June 19, 2013
- Recorded: 2013; Westlake Recording Studios (Los Angeles, California)
- Genre: Alternative rock
- Length: 4:09
- Label: Republic; Mercury
- Songwriters: Alexander Grant; Ben McKee; Josh Mosser; Daniel Platzman; Dan Reynolds; Wayne Sermon
- Producers: Alexander Grant; Josh Mosser

"Who We Are" is a song by American rock band Imagine Dragons. The song was originally recorded for the 2013 Soundtrack album The Hunger Games: Catching Fire – Original Motion Picture Soundtrack, which serves as the official soundtrack to the 2013 American science-fiction adventure film The Hunger Games: Catching Fire. It appears as the seventh track on the album.

== Composition ==
The song's lyrics allude to District 12, a region of the fictional country of Panem in The Hunger Games universe, subject to the nation's mining industry, and recounts the feelings of the rebels in District 12 at the onset of the rebellion towards the end of Catching Fire. In addition, the song makes several apparent references to The Hunger Games, especially the events of Catching Fire, including the attic where the protagonists of the novel meet during the rebellion of District 11 and "the view from up here", which references Katniss Everdeen's strategy of climbing trees to get a better view of the arena during the Hunger Games themselves.

== Charts ==
Chart (2013)	Peak position
Canada Hot 100 (Billboard)	89
UK Singles (Official Charts Company)	194
US Rock Songs (Billboard)	22

== Certifications ==
Region	Certification	Certified units/sales
United States (RIAA)	Gold	500,000^{‡}
^{‡} Sales+streaming figures based on certification alone.
