= Monster (Imagine Dragons song) =

Single by Imagine Dragons

from the album Smoke + Mirrors (Super deluxe)
- Released: September 19, 2013
- Recorded: 2013
- Length: 4:09
- Label: KIDinaKORNER; Interscope
- Songwriters: Ben McKee; Daniel Platzman; Dan Reynolds; Wayne Sermon; Alexander Grant
- Producers: Ben McKee; Daniel Platzman; Dan Reynolds; Wayne Sermon; Alexander Grant

Imagine Dragons singles chronology
"On Top of the World" (2013)	"Monster" (2013)	"Radioactive" (remix ft. Kendrick Lamar) (2014)

"Monster" is a song recorded by American rock band Imagine Dragons for the soundtrack to the 2013 action role-playing game Infinity Blade III. It is the band's fifth appearance on a soundtrack. The song was also included on the band’s second studio album, Smoke + Mirrors

== Background ==
"Monster", like all of Imagine Dragons' appearances on soundtracks, is a brand new song written specifically for the soundtrack, this time in collaboration with Chair Entertainment for their 2013 title, Infinity Blade III. It is used in-game, for the final cutscene and when the player equips the "Imagine Dragon" weapon. Speaking of the song, the band stated: "Chair has always been on the cutting edge of mobile gaming. Infinity Blade has been massive and we felt the song fit perfectly with the tone and visuals. We're pretty big gamers ourselves, so we couldn't be more excited."

== Track listing ==
Digital download
No.	Title	Length
1.	"Monster"	4:09

== Personnel ==
Adapted from the "Monster" single.

Imagine Dragons

- Dan Reynolds – vocals
- Wayne Sermon – acoustic guitar, backing vocals, keyboards, electric guitar
- Ben McKee – bass guitar, backing vocals, synthesizer
- Daniel Platzman – drums, viola

Additional personnel

- Alex Da Kid – producer

== Charts ==
Chart (2013)	Peak position
Canada Hot 100 (Billboard)	41
US Billboard Hot 100	78
US Hot Rock & Alternative Songs (Billboard)	13

== Certifications ==
Region	Certification	Certified units/sales
Brazil (Pro-Música Brasil)	Gold	30,000^{‡}
United States (RIAA)	Platinum	1,000,000^{‡}
^{‡} Sales+streaming figures based on certification alone.

== Release history ==
Country	Date	Format	Label
United States	September 19, 2013	Digital download	Interscope; KIDinaKORNER

== In popular culture ==
- The song was featured in a trailer for the 2013 Ubisoft video game Assassin's Creed IV: Black Flag.
- The song was also featured in a promo video for the feud between Daniel Bryan and Triple H during the WWE pay-per-view WrestleMania XXX on April 6, 2014.
- The song was also featured as the end credits theme for the 2013 video game Infinity Blade III.
