= Smoke and Mirrors (Imagine Dragons song) =

Promotional single by Imagine Dragons

from the album Smoke + Mirrors
- Released: February 13, 2015
- Recorded: 2014
- Studio: Imagine Dragons Studio, Las Vegas, Nevada
- Genre: Synth-pop, alternative pop
- Length: 4:20
- Label: KIDinaKORNER; Interscope
- Songwriters: Ben McKee; Daniel Platzman; Dan Reynolds; Wayne Sermon
- Producer: Imagine Dragons

Imagine Dragons promotional singles chronology
"Round and Round" (2012)	"Smoke and Mirrors" (2015)	"I'm So Sorry" (2015)

"Smoke and Mirrors" is a song by American rock band Imagine Dragons. The song serves as the first promotional single and third track from the band's second studio album Smoke + Mirrors (2015). The song peaked at number 32 on the Billboard Hot Rock Songs chart.

== Background and composition ==
The song touches upon lead-singer Dan Reynolds' disillusionment and uncertainty about religion and Mormonism and how it distracts from reality, similar to how smoke and mirrors was used. Tim Cantor, artist of the album and song art for Smoke + Mirrors, used previous art of his to create "a reflection of the two minds in me", similar to the theme of the song.

== Track listing ==
Digital download
No.	Title	Writer(s)	Producer(s)	Length
1.	"Smoke and Mirrors"	Ben McKee; Daniel Platzman; Dan Reynolds; Wayne Sermon	Imagine Dragons	4:20

== Charts ==
Chart (2015)	Peak position
US Hot Rock & Alternative Songs (Billboard)	32
