= On Top of the World (Imagine Dragons song) =

2013 single by Imagine Dragons

Single by Imagine Dragons

from the album Night Visions
- Released: March 18, 2013
- Recorded: 2011
- Studio: Westlake Recording Studios (Los Angeles)
- Genre: Pop, Latin pop
- Length: 3:12
- Label: KidinaKorner; Interscope; Universal
- Songwriters: Ben McKee; Dan Platzman; Dan Reynolds; Wayne Sermon; Alexander Grant
- Producers: Imagine Dragons; Alex da Kid

Imagine Dragons singles chronology
"Demons" (2013)	"On Top of the World" (2013)	"Monster" (2013)

Music video
- "On Top of the World" on YouTube

"On Top of the World" is a song by the American rock band Imagine Dragons first appearing on their major-label debut extended play Continued Silence (2012). The song also appears on their first full-length album Night Visions (2012). "On Top of the World" was released digitally as a single on March 18, 2013.

== Composition ==
"On Top of the World"
"On Top of the World" is a sharp contrast to the darker, thematic songs on Night Visions.

"On Top of the World" primarily features Magne guitar and piano instrumentation, with vocals performed by lead singer Dan Reynolds. Originally published in the key of C major, the song itself expresses a celebration of accomplishment for the band after striving for years to become successful. The song incorporates the chord progression of C-F-C-Dm in the verses, and F-C-G-Dm in the chorus and bridge, with the pre-chorus using Am and G to create a different break in the song. "On Top of the World" is found to be a positive, upbeat track, unlike other songs found on Night Visions, including "Bleeding Out" and "Hear Me".

== In media ==
Imagine Dragons performed the song live on the Australian version of The X Factor in 2013.

"On Top of the World" was licensed for inclusion on the soundtrack of EA Sports games FIFA 13 and FIFA 23. The band, longtime fans of the FIFA video game series, reacted positively to its inclusion in the game and stated that it would be "a lot of fun hearing the track play while we are doing bicycle kicks and screaming at the screen." It also served as the opening theme of the short-lived CBS comedy series Partners. "On Top of the World" was performed by the PS22 Chorus during Barack Obama's second United States presidential inauguration. It also featured in Konami video game Pro Evolution Soccer 2013 as well as being used in a Samsung Galaxy Note 8.0 advert.

The song was featured prominently in the film The Incredible Burt Wonderstone several times.

In 2013, a Philippine commercial of the Toyota Vios was used in this song.

The song was featured in the British kids film All Stars.

The song is featured in the Liv and Maddie episode "Twin-a-Rooney", performed by Dove Cameron in the title role of Liv Rooney. Dove Cameron's version appears on the compilation album Disney Channel Play It Loud.

Hunter Hayes covered the song live on his US tour.

The song was used by ESPN for their coverage of the NBA for the 2013–14 NBA season.

The song was used during Cartoon Network's 2013 Hall of Game Awards.

The song was used in trailers for the films The Croods (2013) and Island of Lemurs: Madagascar (2014).

WPVI-TV in Philadelphia, Pennsylvania uses the song to promote their morning news, Action News Mornings.

The song is used in the Coca-Cola promotional video "Moments of Happiness", shown exclusively at the World of Coca-Cola in Atlanta, Georgia.

On November 9, 2014, Australian Furry YouTuber and singer, thatdancingdog, released a cover of the song featuring other guests from the Furry Down Under! (Note: Also known as FurDU.) convention in Surfers Paradise, Queensland, Australia.

The song was featured in the soundtracks of Alpha and Omega 4: The Legend of the Saw Tooth Cave and The Angry Birds Movie.

From 2013 to 2015, Vodafone Portugal and Vodafone Greece used the song in their ads for the Red phone plan.

In November 2017, Ford used this song in their Black Friday year-end event sales commercial.

== Music video ==
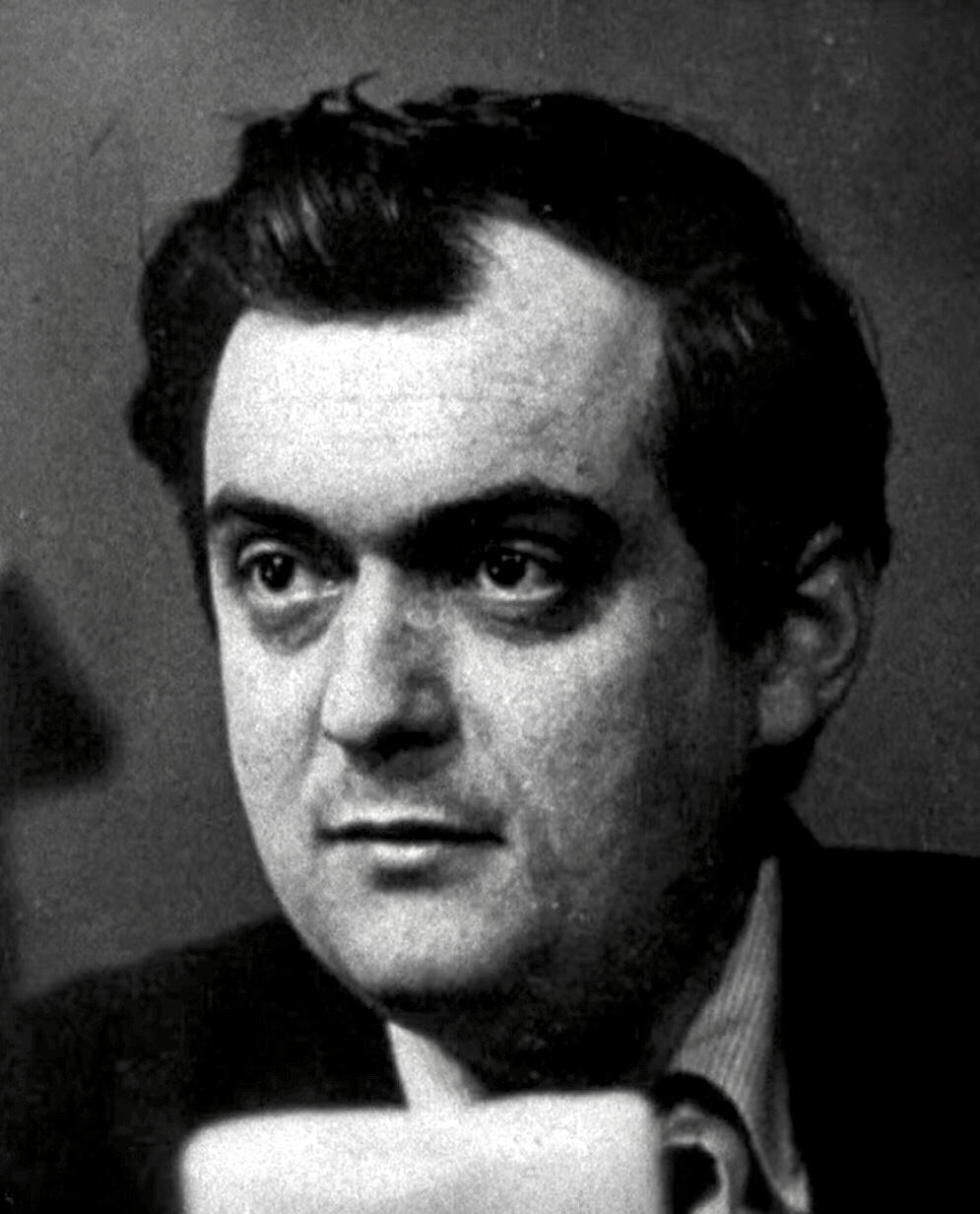
The official music video satirizes a popular conspiracy theory that the Apollo Moon landings were faked with the help of director Stanley Kubrick (pictured)

As a part of the Palladia documentary Imagine Dragons: The Making of Night Visions, which originally aired on November 7, 2012, the band filmed a video of themselves performing "On Top of the World" and subsequently uploaded it to YouTube.

On November 13, 2013, the band released an official music video for the song. The video satirizes a popular conspiracy theory that the 1969 Apollo 11 moon landings were faked, the footage having been directed by Stanley Kubrick, and that Kubrick then made references to the fakery in various of his subsequent films. In the video, a rock band similar to the Beatles (played by the members of Imagine Dragons) pretend to be astronauts for the faked Moon landing. The taping goes awry as fans of the band stream into the sound stage and turn the event into a rock concert, much to the chagrin of Kubrick and President Richard Nixon, who is also on hand; though no one else watching, either in the studio or at home, seems concerned about the revelation of fakery, instead enjoying the music. The video also briefly references another popular conspiracy theory from around the same time, that Beatles member Paul McCartney died in 1966 and was replaced by a look-alike.

The video was filmed in Provo, Utah, Imagine Dragons' original hometown, and includes cameos from various celebrities associated with Provo or Brigham Young University, including Jon Heder, Whit Hertford, the cast of Studio C, Robbie Connolly, and The New Electric Sound. Aja Volkman, Imagine Dragons frontman Dan Reynolds' wife, appears as Reynolds' character's wife. The video was co-directed by Matt Eastin and Corey Fox.

== Track listing ==
Digital download
No.	Title	Length
1.	"On Top of the World"	3:12

Promotional CD
No.	Title	Length
1.	"On Top of the World"	2:58

== Commercial performance ==
The song peaked at 79 on the US Billboard Hot 100 and 10 on the Hot Rock Songs charts. It has also charted in the top ten in Australia (No. 10), Austria (No. 6), Netherlands (No. 10), New Zealand (No. 10), Poland (No. 7), and Portugal (No. 1). Despite having not yet been released to mainstream radio, it has received airplay on contemporary hit stations, such as 97.1 ZHT in Salt Lake City.

The song reached a million copies sold in the U.S. in April 2014. It is the fourth million seller from the Night Visions album.

== Personnel ==
Adapted from Night Visions liner notes.

Imagine Dragons

- Dan Reynolds – lead vocals
- Wayne Sermon – guitar, backing vocals
- Ben McKee – bass, backing vocals
- Daniel Platzman – drums

Additional musicians

- J Browz – guitar

Additional personnel

- Alexander Grant – co-writer, producer
- Charlie Stavish – recording
- Josh Mosser – engineering
- Manny Marroquin – mixing
- Joe LaPorta – mastering

== Charts ==
=== Weekly charts ===
Weekly chart performance for "On Top of the World"
Chart (2012–2014)	Peak position
Australia (ARIA)	10
Austria (Ö3 Austria Top 40)	6
Belgium (Ultratip Bubbling Under Flanders)	11
Belgium (Ultratip Bubbling Under Wallonia)	3
Canada Hot 100 (Billboard)	43
Canada AC (Billboard)	30
Canada Hot AC (Billboard)	37
Colombia Rock Songs (National-Report Top Rock)	5
Czech Republic Airplay (ČNS IFPI)	13
Czech Republic Singles Digital (ČNS IFPI)	21
Finland Airplay (Radiosoittolista)	55
France (SNEP)	35
Germany (GfK)	13
Hungary (Single Top 40)	36
Iceland (RÚV)	23
Ireland (IRMA)	24
Italy (FIMI)	10
Netherlands (Dutch Top 40)	10
Netherlands (Single Top 100)	14
New Zealand (Recorded Music NZ)	10
Portugal Digital Song Sales (Billboard)	1
Poland Airplay (ZPAV)	7
Scottish Singles Sales (Official Charts)	29
Slovakia Singles Digital (ČNS IFPI)	37
Slovenia (SloTop50)	17
South Africa Airplay (EMA)	4
Spain (Promusicae)	21
Sweden (Sverigetopplistan)	40
Switzerland (Schweizer Hitparade)	14
UK Singles (Official Charts)	34
US Billboard Hot 100	79
US Adult Pop Airplay (Billboard)	19
US Hot Rock & Alternative Songs (Billboard)	10
US Rock & Alternative Airplay (Billboard)	22

=== Year-end charts ===
2013 year-end chart performance for "On Top of the World"
Chart (2013)	Position
Australia (ARIA)	43
Germany (Official German Charts)	79
Netherlands (Dutch Top 40)	38
Netherlands (Single Top 100)	42
Sweden (Sverigetopplistan)	78
US Hot Rock Songs (Billboard)	26

2014 year-end chart performance for "On Top of the World"
Chart (2014)	Position
Italy (FIMI)	57
Slovenia (SloTop50)	50
US Hot Rock Songs (Billboard)	23

== Certifications ==
Certifications and sales for "On Top of the World"
Region	Certification	Certified units/sales
Australia (ARIA)	3× Platinum	210,000^{^}
Austria (IFPI Austria)	2× Platinum	60,000^{*}
Brazil (Pro-Música Brasil)	3× Platinum	180,000^{‡}
Canada (Music Canada)	2× Platinum	160,000^{‡}
Germany (BVMI)	Platinum	300,000^{‡}
Italy (FIMI)	2× Platinum	100,000^{‡}
New Zealand (RMNZ)	4× Platinum	120,000^{‡}
Norway (IFPI Norway)	Gold	5,000^{*}
Spain (Promusicae)	2× Platinum	120,000^{‡}
Sweden (GLF)	2× Platinum	80,000^{‡}
Switzerland (IFPI Switzerland)	Gold	15,000^{^}
United Kingdom (BPI)	2× Platinum	1,200,000^{‡}
United States (RIAA)	5× Platinum	5,000,000^{‡}
Streaming
Denmark (IFPI Danmark)	Platinum	2,600,000^{†}
Norway (IFPI Norway)	2× Platinum	6,000,000^{†}
^{*} Sales figures based on certification alone.^{^} Shipments figures based on certification alone.^{‡} Sales+streaming figures based on certification alone.^{†} Streaming-only figures based on certification alone.

== Accolades ==
Year	Ceremony	Award	Result
2014	Teen Choice Awards	Choice Rock Song	Nominated
2014	VEVO Hot This Year Awards	Best Alternative/Rock Video	Nominated

== Release history ==
Release dates for "On Top of the World"
Region	Date	Format	Label
Portugal	18 March 2013	Digital download	Interscope Records; KIDinaKORNER
Australia	18 March 2013	Streamed audio	Interscope Records; KIDinaKORNER
United Kingdom	18 March 2013	Streamed audio	Interscope Records; KIDinaKORNER
United States	18 March 2013	Streamed audio	Interscope Records; KIDinaKORNER
Spain	27 May 2013	Contemporary hit radio	Interscope Records
Australia	22 August 2013	Contemporary hit radio	Interscope Records
United States	21 October 2013	Triple A radio	Interscope Records; KIDinaKORNER
United Kingdom	18 November 2013	Contemporary hit radio	Interscope Records; KIDinaKORNER
Australia	18 November 2013	Digital download (RAC remix)	Interscope Records; KIDinaKORNER
Germany	18 November 2013	Digital download (RAC remix)	Interscope Records; KIDinaKORNER
United Kingdom	18 November 2013	Digital download (RAC remix)	Interscope Records; KIDinaKORNER
Italy	30 May 2014	Contemporary hit radio	Interscope Records

== #MakeTheFuture Version ==
In November 2017, petroleum company Shell created a music video of "On Top of the World" as part of their "Make The Future" campaign to promote environment-friendly energy. The featured artists were Jennifer Hudson, Pixie Lott, Luan Santana, Yemi Alade, and Monali Thakur. Another #MakeTheFuture music video also featured American Authors' 2014 hit single Best Day of My Life.
