= Smoke + Mirrors =

2015 studio album by Imagine Dragons

- Standard edition cover. The deluxe edition features a white background, while the "super deluxe" features a gold one.

Studio album by Imagine Dragons
- Released: February 17, 2015
- Recorded: February 2013 – January 2015
- Studios: Imagine Dragons Studio (Las Vegas, Nevada)
- Genres: Pop rock; arena rock; alternative rock
- Length: 50:55
- Labels: Interscope; KidinaKorner
- Producers: Alex da Kid; Imagine Dragons

Imagine Dragons chronology
Night Visions Live (2012)	Smoke + Mirrors (2015)	Evolve (2017)

Singles from Smoke + Mirrors
- 1. "I Bet My Life" Released: October 27, 2014; 2. "Gold" Released: December 16, 2014; 3. "Shots" Released: January 26, 2015

Singles from Smoke + Mirrors (Super deluxe edition)
- 1. "Monster" Released: September 19, 2013; 2. "Battle Cry" Released: June 2, 2014; 3. "Warriors" Released: September 18, 2014

Smoke + Mirrors is the second studio album by American pop rock band Imagine Dragons. The album was recorded during 2014 at the band's home studio in Las Vegas, Nevada. Self-produced by members of the band along with English hip-hop producer Alex da Kid, the album was released by Interscope Records and Grant's Kidinakorner label on February 17, 2015, in the United States.

The album received generally mixed reviews from music critics upon release. However, it debuted at number one on the Billboard 200 in the United States, moving more than 172,000 units (becoming their only album to date to debut at number one), and also debuted at number one on the UK Albums Chart and the Canadian Albums Chart. It has since been certified gold in the United States, United Kingdom, Mexico, and Brazil. The album was supported by three singles: "I Bet My Life", "Gold" and "Shots". As of December 2024, the album has sold over 2,000,000 copies in the US.

The band released a compilation album of fourteen previously unreleased demos to commemorate the tenth anniversary of Smoke + Mirrors. The album, Reflections (from the Vault of Smoke + Mirrors), was released on February 21, 2025, and preceded by the promotional single "Monica".

== Background ==
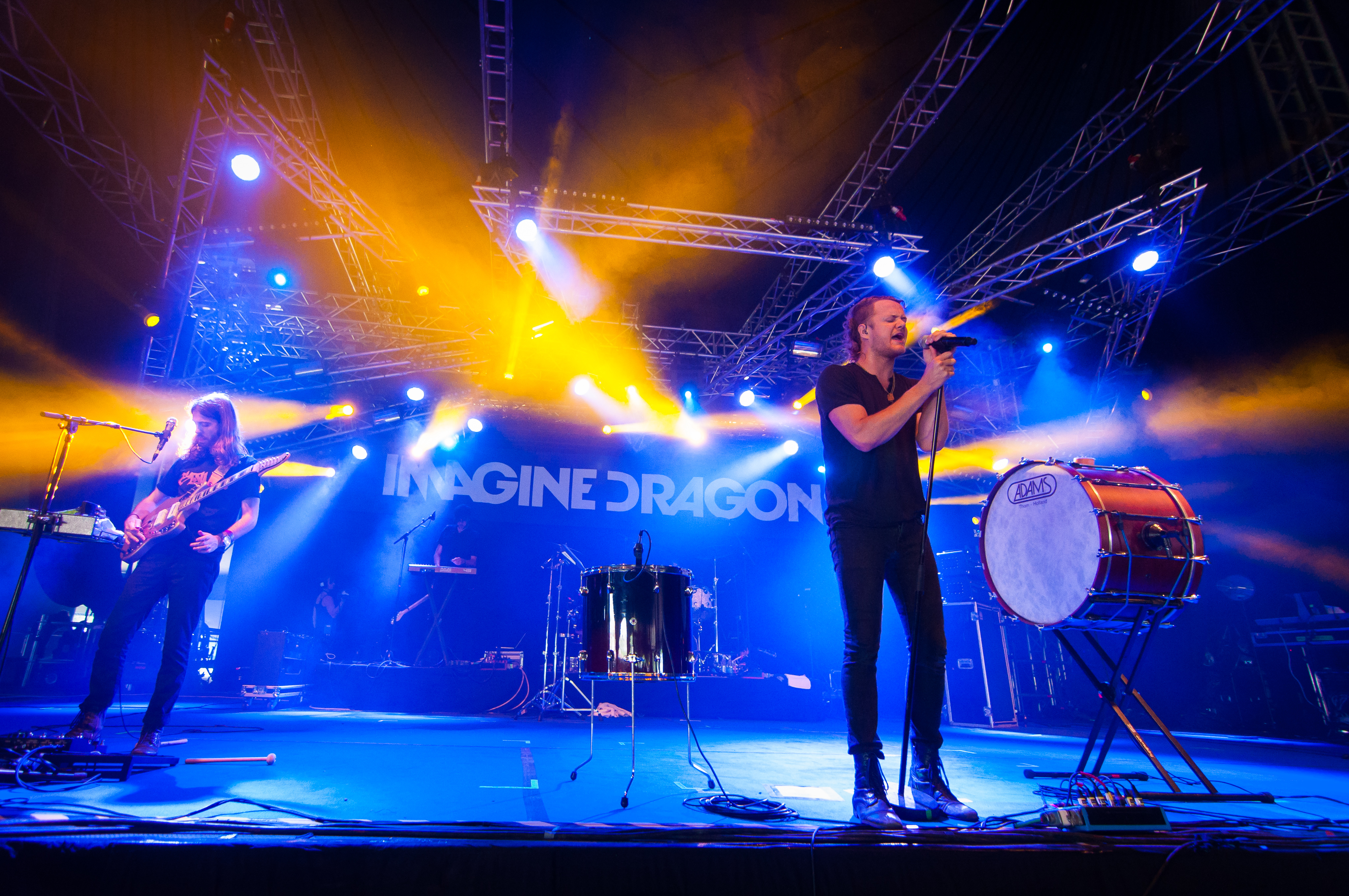
The band embarked on the Night Visions Tour in 2013. The band's experiences on the tour served as an inspiration for their second album.

In 2012, Imagine Dragons released their debut studio album Night Visions. The album, produced by the band along with Alexander Grant and Brandon Darner, launched the band into international mainstream commercial success, charting within the top ten of 14 national record charts, in addition to charting on eight others. Certified Platinum by seven national music associations, including 2× Platinum in the United States by the RIAA and 3× Platinum in Canada by Music Canada, the album was initially met with first week sales in excess of 83,000 copies, the highest charting for a debut rock album since 2006. The album was also nominated for the 2014 Juno Award for International Album of the Year.

The band released six singles during the Night Visions album cycle in 2012 and 2013, five of which charted on the Billboard Hot 100. "Radioactive," a 2013 single, sold more than nine million singles in the United States, spending more than one year consecutively on the Billboard Hot 100. Peaking at no. 3 on the chart, it also broke the record for the longest run into the top five and is the best-selling rock single on the Nielsen SoundScan running list of best-selling rock tracks in digital history. Billboard listed the band as one of "2012's Brightest New Stars" and later "The Breakout Band of 2013."

To further promote the already-successful Night Visions, the band set out on a year-long concert tour beginning in early 2013 and ending in mid-2014, dubbed the "Night Visions Tour." The tour spanned for over 170 dates, and visited North America, South America, Europe and Oceania. An additional tour of North America, dubbed the "Into the Night Tour," was also executed. The conclusion of the Into the Night Tour signaled the end of the Night Visions album cycle, with Night Visions Live, a live album, serving as the last release in the cycle. Lead singer Dan Reynolds joked about the end of the Night Visions cycle, saying that "We're always writing on the road, [so] that second album will come, unless we die at the age of 27 next year. Hopefully we don't die and there will be a second album. I don't know when it will be, but it may come." The band were also inspired greatly by their experiences on the Night Visions Tour. Dan Reynolds told New Orleans–based newspaper The Times-Picayune that the world tour had "a lot of inspiration to be drawn," and further stating, "You kind of realize that you're a lot smaller than you think."

The idea behind the second studio album, dubbed as their "new year's resolution," was to create music and finish it when the band feels that their work is done. Reynolds told MTV in 2014 that the band wanted to "put out an album that [they're] really happy with". He further said that "we tend to be perfectionists, too hard on ourselves at times, and we don't want to rush anything because we know how we are with things. We don't want to put a record out until we really feel good about it, you know, and who knows how long that will take."

== Composition ==
Reynolds stated to music magazine Rolling Stone that the album would be "different" from Night Visions, and that the band intended it to be "stripped back quite a bit." He added that "we embraced a lot of hip-hop influences with 'Night Visions', but I think the next record will be more rock-driven. It's too early to say, but there is some weird stuff going on in these songs."

== Recording ==
The creative process for the album began long before the conclusion of the Night Visions cycle. Since the beginning of the Night Visions Tour in 2012, the band had been writing new material for an upcoming album, and, even as early as the start of the tour, had been recording demos for the album, before entering the studio. By the time that they entered the studio to work on the album, they had amassed 50 demos to work from. The demos had been described by Reynolds as "definitely different," but added that "it's still Imagine Dragons, but we've got a lot of growth and maturing to do as a band. I think [the new material] is going to hopefully be a step in the right direction. We're just trying to create and do what comes out and what feels right." The band also were self-critical throughout the sessions, with Drummer Daniel Platzman stating that there was "no room for external pressure" during the recording of the album.

The band announced a rest at the end of the Night Visions Tour at Lollapalooza in São Paulo, Brazil.

== Promotion ==
The Smoke + Mirrors album cycle featured three singles and two promotional singles. Regional releases from the album feature different track listings. Target has made available an exclusive deluxe version of the album featuring four bonus tracks, available online internationally.

Target teamed with the band to air the first ever live commercial performance during the Grammy Awards. On February 8, 2015, the band performed "Shots" from Las Vegas' Freemont Street under the direction of Jonas Åkerlund. Billboard estimated the commercial cost $8 million in airtime.

Hard Rock Cafe teamed with the band, granting them the first ever full access to take control of Hard Rock Cafe's internal video system (more than 20,000 screens at all 151 locations worldwide) on February 17, 2014. Also, autographed T-shirts will be hidden throughout the Hard Rock Cafe shops supporting the Tyler Robinson Foundation, benefiting the families of children with cancer.

On December 12, 2014, Imagine Dragons posted on social media a request that fans look around Las Vegas Valley for hidden clues to upcoming songs. The band gave 13 fans puzzle pieces of the artwork for the album. When combined, the puzzle pieces revealed the cover art and album title. On December 15, 2014, "Gold" was released as a single with a video being released later. On the cover art for the album were a set of numbers that provided specific coordinates to prizes hidden in the Nevada desert, including an autographed guitar, drumsticks, Polaroid pictures, and a master pass for free concert tickets for the entire tour.

On January 24, 2015, the band flew in 200 prize winning fans from around the world to attend a special listening event at the P3 Studio Art Gallery in the Cosmopolitan of Las Vegas. The event included an art exhibition of Tim Cantor's work for the album and attendees were allowed to listen to the full album through Beats headphones. Then the band arrived for an interview and private performance.

February 20 through February 26, 2015, the band, partnering with Southwest Airlines, flew over 30 winners from all over the U.S. from coast to coast on what they called the "Destination Dragons" Tour. The Destination Dragons tour consisted of all the winners being flown from their hometowns, to small clubs in Los Angeles, Provo, Las Vegas, and Atlanta. This tour was a promotion for Smoke + Mirrors, and a chance for the band to road test their new music live, in preparation for their Smoke + Mirrors World Tour. They paid homage to the clubs they got their start in by playing small, private shows for the Destination Dragons winners, as well as local winners in each city. They played The Troubadour in Los Angeles, Velour in Provo, Utah, Vinyl in Las Vegas, and wrapped up the tour at Terminal West in Atlanta, Georgia. During the Southwest flight from Las Vegas to Atlanta, fans were treated to an acoustic concert in what the airline calls "Live at 35" where artists play for airplane passengers after the airplane reaches 35,000 feet. All winners flew to all 4 cities, were given tickets to all 4 private shows, were able to attend the "Live at 35" event, and were given a meet and greet.

The song "Friction" appeared in the NBA 2K17 soundtrack, the trailer for Mission: Impossible – Fallout and in the third and final season for Crossing Lines.

=== Singles ===
"I Bet My Life" was released as the lead single from Smoke + Mirrors and debuted at number 15 on the Canadian Hot 100, number 27 on the UK Singles Chart, and 28 on the Billboard Hot 100. It also topped the Billboard Adult Alternative Songs, a first for the band. The band performed the song live on American Music Awards (2014), Good Morning America (2015), The Ellen DeGeneres Show (2015), VH1's Big Morning Buzz Live (2015).

"Gold" was released as the second single from Smoke + Mirrors on December 16, 2014, and peaked at number 12 on the Billboard Hot Rock Songs chart.

"Shots" was released as the third and final single from Smoke + Mirrors and charted on the Billboard Hot 100 as well as reaching No. 3 on the Norway Singles chart. The band performed the song live during the Grammy Awards (2015), a first ever live commercial performance, directed by Jonas Åkerlund. They also performed the song live on Good Morning America (2015), The Tonight Show Starring Jimmy Fallon (2015), The Howard Stern Show (2015), Jimmy Kimmel Live!, The Ellen DeGeneres Show (2015), and Today (2015).

=== Promotional singles ===
"Smoke and Mirrors" and "I'm So Sorry" were released as promotional singles in 2015.

=== Tour ===
On February 5, 2015, the band played a live streaming concert for Live Nation and Yahoo! during which they announced the North American leg of the arena tour. The band embarked on a world tour, Smoke + Mirrors Tour, in promotion of the worldwide release of Smoke + Mirrors. The tour began on began April 12, 2015 and concluded on February 5, 2016.

== Critical reception ==
Professional ratings
Aggregate scores
Source	Rating
Metacritic	60/100
Review scores
Source	Rating
AllMusic	3.5/5 stars
Billboard	2.5/5 stars
Consequence of Sound	D+
The Daily Telegraph	4/5 stars
Entertainment Weekly	B+
The Guardian	2/5 stars
New York Daily News	2/5 stars
Q	4/5 stars
Rolling Stone	2/5 stars
USA Today	3/4 stars

Smoke + Mirrors received mixed reviews from music critics. At Metacritic, which assigns a normalized rating out of 100 to reviews from mainstream critics, the album received an average score of 60, based on 12 reviews, which indicates "mixed or average reviews". Q published a positive review of the album, calling it "[a] modern pop-rock gem" and also noting it as an improvement upon their debut album Night Visions." Entertainment Weekly published a positive review stating, "the group's sophomore effort scales back on the electronic frippery, revealing the tightly focused rock juggernaut they are on stage." Illinois Entertainer published an interview with Reynolds on February 2, 2015, saying the album is "an ambitious, rock-solid effort, with potential hits galore." The Daily Telegraph published a highly positive review of the album, calling it "thunderous" and saying its "songs are peppered with bright ideas and odd collisions, world music sounds percolating through R&B grooves, stuttering digital breaks interrupting solid rhythms. Lyrics and delivery suggest Imagine Dragons adhere to old-fashioned rock band idealism, but nothing is allowed to get in the way of a sparkling hook."

Allison Stewart of The Washington Post wrote that the band "is very good at what it does, even if what it does isn't very good," having "effortlessly achieved" the album's one purpose, "to cram as many popular styles as possible into a mainstream rock album to appeal to as many people as it can." Dave DiMartino of Yahoo! Music wrote that "it is the band's music, and not their faces, or personalities, that resonates with the mass audiences. And this is good. . . This is a pretty solid, surprisingly diverse sounding rock album—not a tuneless screech-fest by any means—and a record the band should be proud of. . . This could have been a shambles, and it's anything but." Stephen Thomas Erlewine of AllMusic described the album as "overblown" arena rock, with more style than substance, and an overemphasis on reverberation effects such that "the reverb nearly functions as a fifth instrument in the band".

The album's lyrics were nominated for an AML Award.

== Commercial performance ==
Smoke + Mirrors debuted at number one on the US Billboard 200 chart with 195,000 album-equivalent units (172,000 of which were pure album sales). It more than doubled the group's previous best sales week. The album remained in the chart's top twenty for the next several weeks, as of December 2, 2024, the album has sold over 2,000,000 copies in the United States. In the United Kingdom, it became the final album to reach number one on sales alone as streaming became incorporated into the UK Albums Chart the following week.

== Track listing ==
All songs written and produced by Imagine Dragons (Dan Reynolds, Wayne Sermon, Ben McKee and Daniel Platzman), except where noted.

Smoke + Mirrors
No.	Title	Writer(s)	Producer(s)	Length
1.	"Shots"			3:52
2.	"Gold"	Alexander Grant; Imagine Dragons	Alex da Kid; Imagine Dragons	3:37
3.	"Smoke and Mirrors"			4:21
4.	"I'm So Sorry"			3:50
5.	"I Bet My Life"			3:14
6.	"Polaroid"			3:50
7.	"Friction"			3:22
8.	"It Comes Back to You"			3:37
9.	"Dream"	Grant; Imagine Dragons	Alex da Kid; Imagine Dragons	4:19
10.	"Trouble"			3:13
11.	"Summer"			3:38
12.	"Hopeless Opus"			4:01
13.	"The Fall"			6:05
Total length:				50:55

Deluxe edition
No.	Title	Length
14.	"Thief"	3:48
15.	"The Unknown"	3:24
16.	"Second Chances"	3:38
17.	"Release"	2:28
Total length:		64:11

International deluxe edition
No.	Title	Writer(s)	Producer(s)	Length
18.	"Warriors" (from 2014 League of Legends World Championship)	Grant; Josh Mosser; Imagine Dragons	Alex da Kid	2:50
Total length:				67:01

Super deluxe edition
No.	Title	Writer(s)	Producer(s)	Length
19.	"Battle Cry" (from Transformers: Age of Extinction)			4:34
20.	"Monster" (from Infinity Blade III)	Imagine Dragons; Grant	Alex da Kid; Imagine Dragons	4:09
21.	"Who We Are" (from The Hunger Games: Catching Fire)	Grant; Josh Mosser; Imagine Dragons	Grant; Mosser	4:10
Total length:				79:55

Smoke + Mirrors Ten
No.	Title	Length
22.	"I Bet My Life" (demo)	2:46
Total length:		82:41

Asia Tour Edition
No.	Title	Producer(s)	Length
19.	"Shots" (Broiler Remix)	Broiler	3:12
20.	"I Bet My Life" (Imagine Dragons Remix)		3:52
21.	"I Bet My Life" (Lost Kings Remix)	Lost Kings	3:59
Total length:			75:03

Spotify UK deluxe edition
No.	Title	Producer(s)	Length
22.	"Shots" (Broiler Remix)	Broiler	3:12
Total length:			83:00

Note

- All bonus tracks on a separate disc on physical versions.

== Personnel ==
Imagine Dragons

- Dan Reynolds – lead vocals, percussion, piano, keyboards, songwriting, production
- Wayne Sermon – guitar, songwriting, production
- Ben McKee – bass guitar, keyboards, synthesizers, horns, songwriting, production
- Daniel Platzman – drums, percussion, viola, songwriting, production

== Charts ==
=== Weekly charts ===
Chart (2015)	Peak position
Australian Albums (ARIA)	4
Austrian Albums (Ö3 Austria)	5
Belgian Albums (Ultratop Flanders)	9
Belgian Albums (Ultratop Wallonia)	8
Canadian Albums (Billboard)	1
Czech Albums (ČNS IFPI)	8
Danish Albums (Hitlisten)	15
Dutch Albums (Album Top 100)	6
French Albums (SNEP)	9
German Albums (Offizielle Top 100)	3
Hungarian Albums (MAHASZ)	13
Irish Albums (IRMA)	6
Italian Albums (FIMI)	6
Japanese Albums (Oricon)	50
Mexican Albums (AMPROFON)	5
New Zealand Albums (RMNZ)	4
Norwegian Albums (VG-lista)	11
Polish Albums (ZPAV)	10
Portuguese Albums (AFP)	10
Scottish Albums (Official Charts)	1
Spanish Albums (Promusicae)	2
Swedish Albums (Sverigetopplistan)	21
Swiss Albums (Schweizer Hitparade)	3
UK Albums (Official Charts)	1
UK Album Downloads (Official Charts)	2
US Billboard 200	1
US Top Rock Albums (Billboard)	1
US Top Alternative Albums (Billboard)	1

=== Monthly charts ===
Chart (2015)	Peak position
Argentine Monthly Albums (CAPIF)	9

=== Year-end charts ===
Chart (2015)	Position
Australian Albums (ARIA)	62
Belgian Albums (Ultratop Flanders)	128
Belgian Albums (Ultratop Wallonia)	113
Canadian Albums (Billboard)	15
French Albums (SNEP)	88
Italian Albums (FIMI)	80
Mexican Albums (AMPROFON)	38
New Zealand Albums (RMNZ)	40
Spanish Albums (PROMUSICAE)	72
Swedish Albums (Sverigetopplistan)	54
Swiss Albums (Schweizer Hitparade)	86
UK Albums (OCC)	48
US Billboard 200	29
US Digital Albums (Billboard)	24
US Top Rock Albums (Billboard)	6

Chart (2017)	Position
US Top Rock Albums (Billboard)	35

== Certifications ==
Region	Certification	Certified units/sales
Austria (IFPI Austria)	Gold	7,500^{*}
Canada (Music Canada)	Platinum	80,000^{‡}
Denmark (IFPI Danmark)	Platinum	20,000^{‡}
Germany (BVMI)	Gold	100,000^{‡}
Italy (FIMI)	Platinum	50,000^{‡}
Mexico (AMPROFON)	Gold	30,000^{^}
New Zealand (RMNZ)	2× Platinum	30,000^{‡}
Norway (IFPI Norway)	Gold	15,000^{‡}
Poland (ZPAV)	Platinum	20,000^{‡}
Singapore (RIAS)	Gold	5,000^{*}
Sweden (GLF)	Gold	20,000^{‡}
United Kingdom (BPI)	Platinum	300,000^{‡}
United States (RIAA)	2× Platinum	2,000,000^{‡}
Summaries
Worldwide	—	1,100,000
^{*} Sales figures based on certification alone.^{^} Shipments figures based on certification alone.^{‡} Sales+streaming figures based on certification alone.

== Release history ==
Region	Date	Format	Edition	Label
Argentina	February 11, 2015	CD; digital download	Standard; Deluxe	Universal Music
Brazil	February 13, 2015	CD	Deluxe	Universal Music
Norway	February 13, 2015	CD; digital download	Standard; Deluxe; Super Deluxe	Interscope
United States	February 17, 2015	CD; digital download	Standard; Deluxe	Interscope; KIDinaKORNER

== Reflections (from the Vault of Smoke + Mirrors) ==
Reflections (from the Vault of Smoke + Mirrors)

Compilation album by Imagine Dragons
- Released: January 21, 2025
- Length: 41:39
- Labels: Interscope; Kidinakorner
- Producers: Imagine Dragons; Alex da Kid; Goldwiing; Asa Taccone

Imagine Dragons chronology
Loom (2024)	Reflections (from the Vault of Smoke + Mirrors) (2025)

Reflections (from the Vault of Smoke + Mirrors) is a compilation album containing fourteen previously unreleased demos for the tenth anniversary of Smoke + Mirrors. Released on February 21, 2025, the album was preceded by one promotional single, "Monica", released on January 27, 2025. It also includes a demo version of the Smoke + Mirrors single "I Bet My Life". In addition to the band and Alex da Kid who produced Smoke + Mirrors, Reflections features production from composer Asa Taccone and the band's former drummer Andrew Tolman, credited alongside guitarist Wayne Sermon as Goldwiing.

=== Track listing ===
All tracks produced by Imagine Dragons, except where noted.

Reflections (from the Vault of Smoke + Mirrors)
No.	Title	Writer(s)	Producer(s)	Length
1.	"Woke"	Dan Reynolds, Wayne Sermon, Ben McKee		3:41
2.	"The Ghost Intervention"	Reynolds, Sermon, McKee		3:14
3.	"Monica"	Reynolds, Sermon, McKee, Daniel Platzman, Alexander Grant, Andrew Tolman, Asa Taccone		3:19
4.	"Black"	Reynolds, Sermon, McKee		3:24
5.	"Strange Ways"	Reynolds, Sermon, McKee, Tolman		2:31
6.	"I Get Carried Away"	Reynolds, Sermon, McKee		3:15
7.	"A-OK"	Reynolds, Sermon, McKee, Tolman		2:22
8.	"Destroyed"	Reynolds, Sermon, McKee, Grant	Alex da Kid	3:30
9.	"Playin'Me"	Reynolds, Sermon, McKee, Taccone	Taccone	2:43
10.	"My Car"	Reynolds, Sermon, McKee, Platzman, Grant, Tolman, Taccone		2:32
11.	"Cowboy"	Reynolds, Sermon, McKee, Taccone	Taccone	2:40
12.	"Mayday"	Reynolds, Sermon, McKee		3:13
13.	"The Journey"	Reynolds, Sermon, McKee, Platzman		2:41
14.	"I Bet My Life"	Reynolds, Sermon, McKee, Platzman, Grant, Tolman, Taccone	Alex da Kid, Taccone, Goldwiing, Imagine Dragons	2:46
Total length:				41:39

== See also ==
- List of Billboard 200 number-one albums of 2015
- List of number-one albums of 2015 in Canada
- List of UK Albums Chart number ones of the 2010s
