= Teen Choice Award for Choice Music – Rock Song =

Entertainment award category

The following is a list of Teen Choice Award winners and nominees for Choice Music - Rock Song. It was first introduced as Choice Music - Rock Track in 2001 before being retitled in 2012. It was retitled to Choice Music - Rock/Alternative Song in 2018. Paramore receives the most wins with 4.

== Winners and nominees ==
=== 2000s ===
Year	Winner	Nominees	Ref.
2001	"Jaded" – Aerosmith	"Butterfly" – Crazy Town; "Duck and Run" – 3 Doors Down; "Follow Me" – Uncle Kracker; "Hanging by a Moment" – Lifehouse; "It's Been Awhile" – Staind; "My Way" – Limp Bizkit; "One Step Closer" – Linkin Park	
2002	"Adrienne" – The Calling	"Blurry" – Puddle of Mudd; "In the End" – Linkin Park; "The Middle" – Jimmy Eat World; "My Sacrifice" – Creed; "Nice to Know You" – Incubus; "Wasting My Time" – Default; "Youth of the Nation" – P.O.D.	
2003	*"Bring Me to Life" – Evanescence	"Headstrong" – Trapt; "Like a Stone" – Audioslave; "Price to Play" – Staind; "Send the Pain Below" – Chevelle; "Seven Nation Army" – The White Stripes; "Somewhere I Belong" – Linkin Park; "Times Like These" – Foo Fighters'	
2004	"This Love" – Maroon 5	"Feeling This" – Blink-182; "Here Without You" – 3 Doors Down; "Hold On" – Good Charlotte; "It's My Life" – No Doubt; "My Immortal" – Evanescence; "The Reason" – Hoobastank; "Somewhere I Belong" – Linkin Park	
2005	"Boulevard of Broken Dreams" – Green Day	"Beverly Hills" – Weezer; "I Don't Want to Be" – Gavin DeGraw; "Let Me Go" – 3 Doors Down; "Mr. Brightside" – The Killers; "Pain" – Jimmy Eat World; "Scars" – Papa Roach; "She Will Be Loved" – Maroon 5	
2006	"Dance, Dance" – Fall Out Boy	"Dani California" – Red Hot Chili Peppers; "I Write Sins Not Tragedies" – Panic! at the Disco; "MakeDamnSure" – Taking Back Sunday; "Move Along" – The All-American Rejects; "Over My Head (Cable Car)" – The Fray	
2007	"Thnks fr th Mmrs" – Fall Out Boy	"Better Than Me" – Hinder; "It's Not Over" – Daughtry; "Makes Me Wonder" – Maroon 5; "What I've Done" – Linkin Park	
2008	"crushcrushcrush" – Paramore	"The Great Escape" – Boys Like Girls; "Nine in the Afternoon" – Panic! at the Disco; "Shadow of the Day" – Linkin Park; "Stop and Stare" – OneRepublic	
2009	"Decode" – Paramore	"Gives You Hell" – The All-American Rejects; "Know Your Enemy" – Green Day; "Sink into Me" – Taking Back Sunday; "You Found Me" – The Fray	

=== 2010s ===
Year	Winner	Nominees	Ref.
2010	"Ignorance" – Paramore	"All the Right Moves" – OneRepublic; "Breakeven" – The Script; "Hey, Soul Sister" – Train; "You and Your Heart" – Jack Johnson	
2011	"Monster" – Paramore	"Good Life" – OneRepublic; "Rope" – Foo Fighters; "Sing" – My Chemical Romance; "Waiting for the End" – Linkin Park	
2012	"Paradise" – Coldplay	"Lonely Boy" – The Black Keys; "Pumped Up Kicks" – Foster the People; "We Are Young" – fun. featuring Janelle Monáe; "Somebody That I Used To Know" – Gotye featuring Kimbra	
2013	"Radioactive" – Imagine Dragons	"Carry On" – fun.; "Gone, Gone, Gone" – Phillip Phillips; "Ho Hey" – The Lumineers; "Sail" – AWOLNATION	
2014	"Pompeii" – Bastille	"Ain't It Fun" – Paramore; "Love Runs Out" – OneRepublic; "Maps" – Maroon 5; "On Top of the World" – Imagine Dragons	
2015	"Take Me to Church" – Hozier	"Budapest" – George Ezra; "I Bet My Life" – Imagine Dragons; "Renegades" – X Ambassadors; "Tear in My Heart" – Twenty One Pilots; "Uma Thurman" – Fall Out Boy	
2016	"Jet Black Heart" – 5 Seconds of Summer	"America's Sweetheart" – Elle King; "HandClap" – Fitz and the Tantrums; "Stressed Out" – Twenty One Pilots; "Walking on a Dream" – Empire of the Sun; "Wherever I Go" – OneRepublic	
2017	"Believer" – Imagine Dragons	"Green Light" – Lorde; "Hard Times" – Paramore; "Heathens" – Twenty One Pilots; "Heavy" – Linkin Park featuring Kiiara; "Human" – Rag'n'Bone Man	
2018	"Whatever it Takes" – Imagine Dragons	"Alone" – Halsey; "Hard Times" – Paramore; "High Hopes" – Panic! at the Disco; "No Roots" – Alice Merton; "Sit Next to Me" – Foster the People	
2019	"Hey Look Ma, I Made It" – Panic! at the Disco	"100 Bad Days" – AJR; "Joy" – Bastille; "Natural" – Imagine Dragons; "Ready to Let Go" – Cage the Elephant; "these are my friends" – Lovelytheband	
