= Gold (Imagine Dragons song) =

Single by Imagine Dragons

from the album Smoke + Mirrors
- Released: December 16, 2014
- Recorded: 2014 at Imagine Dragons Studio; (Las Vegas, Nevada)
- Length: 3:37
- Label: KIDinaKORNER; Interscope
- Songwriters: Alexander Grant; Ben McKee; Daniel Platzman; Dan Reynolds; Wayne Sermon
- Producer: Alex da Kid

Imagine Dragons singles chronology
"I Bet My Life" (2014)	"Gold" (2014)	"Shots" (2015)

Music video
- "Gold" on YouTube

"Gold" is a song by American rock band Imagine Dragons based on the story of the Midas Touch. The track was released as the second single from their second studio album Smoke + Mirrors on December 16, 2014. The track was written by band members Ben McKee, Daniel Platzman, Dan Reynolds and Wayne Sermon, as well as the producer of the song, Alex da Kid. The music video was released onto Vevo on January 21, 2015. The song was used by FX to promote their FX Now app, and by Discovery Channel to promote their show Gold Rush's season 6 premiere. The Jorgen Odegard remix of the song was featured on the soundtrack of the video game, NBA 2K17.

== Composition and production ==
According to the sheet music published at musicnotes.com, the song is written in the key of A minor, with a moderate tempo.

=== Lyrics ===
Along with "Hopeless Opus" and "I'm So Sorry" on Smoke + Mirrors, the song touches upon lead-singer Dan Reynolds' depression struggles.

=== Recording ===
Dan Reynolds told Billboard that "Gold" was one of the last songs to be recorded for Smoke + Mirrors: "I came home from tour with my head spinning and decided to run away for a bit to the west coast and reflect/write about the last couple years." He also commented on how listening and performing the song takes him back to the moment of writing the song on the beach.

== Track listing ==
Digital download
No.	Title	Writer(s)	Producer(s)	Length
1.	"Gold"	Alexander Grant; Ben McKee; Daniel Platzman; Dan Reynolds; Wayne Sermon	Alex da Kid; Imagine Dragons	3:36

== Charts ==
=== Weekly charts ===
Weekly chart performance for "Gold"
Chart (2015)	Peak position
US Hot Rock & Alternative Songs (Billboard)	12

=== Year-end charts ===
Year-end chart performance for "Gold"
Chart (2015)	Position
US Hot Rock Songs (Billboard)	89

== Certifications ==
Certifications for "Gold"
Region	Certification	Certified units/sales
Brazil (Pro-Música Brasil)	Platinum	60,000^{‡}
United States (RIAA)	Gold	500,000^{‡}
^{‡} Sales+streaming figures based on certification alone.
