= I Bet My Life =

Single by Imagine Dragons

from the album Smoke + Mirrors
- Released: October 27, 2014
- Recorded: 2014
- Studio: Imagine Dragons Studio (Las Vegas, Nevada)
- Genre: Folk rock
- Length: 3:14
- Label: KIDinaKORNER; Interscope
- Songwriters: Ben McKee; Daniel Platzman; Dan Reynolds; Wayne Sermon
- Producer: Imagine Dragons

Imagine Dragons singles chronology
"Warriors" (2014)	"I Bet My Life" (2014)	"Gold" (2014)

Music video
- "I Bet My Life" on YouTube

"I Bet My Life" is a song by American pop rock band Imagine Dragons. The track, written by band members Ben McKee, Daniel Platzman, Dan Reynolds and Wayne Sermon, was released as the lead single from their second studio album Smoke + Mirrors (2015) on October 27, 2014. The band's network debut performing the track occurred at the American Music Awards (2014), where they received the award for Favorite Alternative Artist.

== Composition ==
=== Themes ===
Lead singer Dan Reynolds has stated that the song is about his relationship with his parents and explained that while "at times it's been strained and difficult... in the end, 'I Bet My Life' celebrates the bond that we still hold on to."

== Music video ==
On December 12, 2014, Imagine Dragons released the official music video for "I Bet My Life". The video was directed by Jodeb and features actors Dane DeHaan and Alex Neustaedter. Footage from the video featured in advertising by American automobile manufacturer Jeep at the American Music Awards, prior to the release of the video.

=== Synopsis ===
The beginning and end of the video take place at the Salt River in Arizona. A car is shown driving to the river. The cast are the members of Imagine Dragons, and their relatives and friends. Somewhere else at the river, a boy in a shirt (DeHaan) and a boy in overalls (Neustaedter) are seen fighting at the waterbed. While walking away, Neustaedter eventually pushes DeHaan into the river and it is implied that DeHaan swims away, while the former stares in shock. DeHaan is pulled towards a dam, in which he is sucked in. He lands in a house, looks out the window, and sees that everything is underwater. He finds a bed and goes to sleep. The next morning, DeHaan wakes up in a sailboat and takes control of it. He tries unsuccessfully to avoid a waterfall, but ends up flying over the land in the boat after he goes over the waterfall. While looking over the boat, he decides to flip it over. He falls into a city, where a crowd is shown carrying him. They toss and turn him, until he realizes it was a vision and he was knocked unconscious in the dam. He is pulled back up to the surface by Neustaedter, and survives. The last shot of the video zooms out from the point where DeHaan is picked up, and the video ends.

== Reception ==
Carolyn Menyes of Music Times called the song "Another [Imagine Dragons] strong armed rolling anthem." James Grebey of www.spin.com called it "Bombastic" and USA Today named it "Song of the week" during October 27-November 4.

== Track listing ==
Digital download
No.	Title	Writer(s)	Producer(s)	Length
1.	"I Bet My Life"	Ben McKee; Daniel Platzman; Dan Reynolds; Wayne Sermon	Imagine Dragons	3:12

== Remixes ==
Bastille, Alex Adair, Lost Kings, Imagine Dragons, and Riot Games have all released remixes.

== Personnel ==
Imagine Dragons

- Dan Reynolds – lead vocals, songwriting, production
- Wayne Sermon – guitar, songwriting, production
- Ben McKee – bass guitar, songwriting, production
- Daniel Platzman – drums, percussion, songwriting, production

== Charts ==
=== Weekly charts ===
Chart (2014–15)	Peak position
Australia (ARIA)	36
Austria (Ö3 Austria Top 40)	74
Belgium (Ultratip Bubbling Under Flanders)	5
Belgium (Ultratip Bubbling Under Wallonia)	6
Canada Hot 100 (Billboard)	15
Canada CHR/Top 40 (Billboard)	38
Canada Hot AC (Billboard)	24
Canada Rock (Billboard)	4
Czech Republic Airplay (ČNS IFPI)	76
France (SNEP)	42
Germany (GfK)	65
Hungary (Single Top 40)	20
Hungary (Stream Top 40)	39
Ireland (IRMA)	40
Italy (FIMI)	54
Japan Hot 100 (Billboard)	30
Netherlands (Dutch Top 40)	27
Netherlands (Single Top 100)	63
New Zealand (Recorded Music NZ)	28
Spain (Promusicae)	30
Switzerland (Schweizer Hitparade)	71
UK Singles (Official Charts)	27
US Billboard Hot 100	28
US Hot Rock & Alternative Songs (Billboard)	3
US Rock & Alternative Airplay (Billboard)	3
US Adult Contemporary (Billboard)	17
US Adult Pop Airplay (Billboard)	7
US Pop Airplay (Billboard)	28

=== Year-end charts ===
Chart (2014)	Position
US Hot Rock Songs (Billboard)	87

Chart (2015)	Position
Canadian Hot 100	69
US Billboard Adult Alternative Songs	20
US Billboard Adult Pop Songs	24
US Billboard Alternative Songs	19
US Billboard Hot Rock Songs	9
US Billboard Rock Airplay Songs	14
US Billboard Rock Digital Songs	9

== Certifications ==
Region	Certification	Certified units/sales
Brazil (Pro-Música Brasil)	2× Platinum	80,000^{‡}
Canada (Music Canada)	3× Platinum	240,000^{‡}
Italy (FIMI)	Gold	25,000^{‡}
New Zealand (RMNZ)	Platinum	30,000^{‡}
Norway (IFPI Norway)	Gold	20,000^{‡}
Spain (Promusicae)	Gold	30,000^{‡}
Sweden (GLF)	Gold	20,000^{‡}
United Kingdom (BPI)	Gold	400,000^{‡}
United States (RIAA)	3× Platinum	3,000,000^{‡}
^{*} Sales figures based on certification alone.^{‡} Sales+streaming figures based on certification alone.

== Accolades ==
Year	Ceremony	Award	Result
2015	Teen Choice Awards	Choice Rock Song	Nominated

== Release history ==
Region	Date	Format	Label	Ref.
Australia	October 27, 2014	Digital download	Interscope Records; KIDinaKORNER	
Canada	October 27, 2014	Digital download	Interscope Records; KIDinaKORNER	
United States	October 27, 2014	Digital download	Interscope Records; KIDinaKORNER	
Italy	October 27, 2014	Contemporary hit radio	Interscope Records	
United States	November 3, 2014	Adult album alternative radio	Interscope Records	
United States	November 4, 2014	Modern rock radio	Interscope Records	
United States	January 27, 2015	Contemporary hit radio	Interscope Records	
United Kingdom	February 8, 2015	Digital download	Interscope Records; KIDinaKORNER	
