= Demons (Imagine Dragons song) =

2013 single by Imagine Dragons

Single by Imagine Dragons

from the album Night Visions
- Released: January 28, 2013
- Recorded: 2011
- Studio: Westlake Recording Studios (West Hollywood, California)
- Genre: Pop rock
- Length: 2:58
- Label: KIDinaKORNER; Interscope
- Songwriters: Alex da Kid; Ben McKee; Dan Reynolds; Wayne Sermon; Josh Mosser
- Producer: Alex da Kid

Imagine Dragons singles chronology
"Hear Me" (2012)	"Demons" (2013)	"On Top of the World" (2013)

Music video
- "Demons" on YouTube

"Demons" is a song by American pop rock band Imagine Dragons. It was written by Alex da Kid, Ben McKee, Dan Reynolds, Wayne Sermon, Josh Mosser and produced by Alex da Kid. The song appears on their major-label debut extended play, Continued Silence (2012), and also makes an appearance on their debut studio album, Night Visions (2012), as the fourth track. "Demons" was solicited to American triple-A radio stations on January 28, 2013, and to modern rock stations two months later, on April 1, 2013. It serves as the album's overall fifth single and was released as the third single from Night Visions in the United States, later released to US contemporary hit radio stations on September 17, 2013, as an official single. The lyrics portray the protagonist warning the significant other of his or her flaws.

The song was a commercial success, becoming their second top ten single after "Radioactive". It spent twelve weeks in the top ten on the Billboard Hot 100, four of which were spent at its number six peak. It is Imagine Dragons' second song to stay more than one year on the Hot 100 (61 weeks). Within two years of its release, more than 4.1 million copies were sold in the United States, making it the eighth most downloaded song in rock history at the time. It has also been a moderate commercial success worldwide, charting in several countries. The song won a MuchMusic Video Award for International Video of the Year – Group (2014) and an iHeartRadio Music Award for Alternative Rock Song of the Year (2014).

== Composition ==
The song is written in the key of E♭ major with a slow-moderate tempo of 90 beats per minute. The chord progression is E♭-B♭-Cm-A♭.

== Music video ==
An MTV report on the "Demons" music video stated that it would "fit nicely with the artful imagery of 'It's Time' and the thoroughly out-there puppet grappling of 'Radioactive'." Released on May 7, 2013, and shot in Las Vegas, Nevada at the band's performance at The Joint on February 9, 2013, the video features a mix of live footage of the band and a companion narrative. Various characters with personal hardships are depicted, including a grieving daughter, a man with Marfan syndrome who stares at himself in a mirror, a victim of parental abuse and a military veteran carrying his wounded comrade. The meaning imposed is that most do not see beyond the face that everyone puts on for the public. The clip ends with a dedication to Tyler Robinson (1995–2013), a fan of the band who died at the age of 17 in March 2013 following a battle with cancer. The music reached the one billion view milestone on July 18, 2022.

== Track listing ==
Digital download
No.	Title	Length
1.	"Demons" (Imagine Dragons Remix)	3:16
2.	"Demons" (KIDinaKORNER Remix)	3:19
3.	"Demons" (Acoustic Live in London)	3:07

== Charts ==
=== Weekly charts ===
Weekly chart performance for "Demons"
Chart (2013–2014)	Peak position
Australia (ARIA)	11
Austria (Ö3 Austria Top 40)	7
Belgium (Ultratip Bubbling Under Flanders)	2
Belgium (Ultratip Bubbling Under Wallonia)	5
Brazil (Billboard Brasil Hot 100)	5
Brazil (Hot Pop Songs)	3
Canada Hot 100 (Billboard)	4
Canada AC (Billboard)	3
Canada CHR/Top 40 (Billboard)	3
Canada Hot AC (Billboard)	1
Canada Rock (Billboard)	7
CIS Airplay (TopHit)	7
Czech Republic Airplay (ČNS IFPI)	10
Czech Republic Singles Digital (ČNS IFPI)	9
France (SNEP)	15
Germany (GfK)	15
Germany (Airplay Chart)	1
Global 200 (Billboard)	140
Hungary (Single Top 40)	20
Hungary (Stream Top 40)	36
Ireland (IRMA)	11
Italy (FIMI)	5
Latvia (European Hit Radio)	1
Lebanon (Lebanese Top 20)	6
Mexico Anglo (Monitor Latino)	17
Netherlands (Dutch Top 40)	11
Netherlands (Single Top 100)	27
New Zealand (Recorded Music NZ)	12
Poland Airplay (ZPAV)	5
Portugal (AFP)	113
Russia Airplay (TopHit)	2
Scottish Singles Sales (Official Charts)	11
Slovakia Airplay (ČNS IFPI)	7
Slovakia Singles Digital (ČNS IFPI)	14
Slovenia (SloTop50)	9
Spain (Promusicae)	26
Sweden (Sverigetopplistan)	7
Switzerland (Schweizer Hitparade)	8
UK Singles (Official Charts)	13
Ukraine Airplay (TopHit)	12
US Billboard Hot 100	6
US Adult Contemporary (Billboard)	11
US Adult Pop Airplay (Billboard)	2
US Dance Airplay (Billboard)	17
US Hot Rock & Alternative Songs (Billboard)	2
US Pop Airplay (Billboard)	1
US Rhythmic Airplay (Billboard)	34
US Rock & Alternative Airplay (Billboard)	2
Vietnam Hot 100 (Billboard)	59

=== Year-end charts ===
2013 year-end chart performance for "Demons"
Chart (2013)	Position
Brazil (Crowley)	305
Canada (Canadian Hot 100)	54
Denmark (Tracklisten)	43
New Zealand (Recorded Music NZ)	39
Sweden (Sverigetopplistan)	99
US Billboard Hot 100	62
US Adult Top 40 (Billboard)	50
US Hot Rock Songs (Billboard)	8
US Rock Airplay (Billboard)	6

2014 year-end chart performance for "Demons"
Chart (2014)	Position
Austria (Ö3 Austria Top 40)	36
Brazil (Crowley)	71
Canada (Canadian Hot 100)	17
France (SNEP)	31
Germany (Official German Charts)	57
Italy (FIMI)	7
Netherlands (Dutch Top 40)	28
Netherlands (Single Top 100)	52
Poland (ZPAV)	16
Russia Airplay (TopHit)	14
Slovenia (SloTop50)	30
Spain (PROMUSICAE)	49
Sweden (Sverigetopplistan)	18
Switzerland (Schweizer Hitparade)	27
Ukraine Airplay (TopHit)	39
UK Singles (Official Charts Company)	87
US Billboard Hot 100	23
US Adult Contemporary (Billboard)	21
US Adult Top 40 (Billboard)	22
US Hot Rock Songs (Billboard)	6
US Mainstream Top 40 (Billboard)	35
US Rock Airplay (Billboard)	13

2024 year-end chart performance for "Demons"
Chart (2024)	Position
France (SNEP)	163
Switzerland (Schweizer Hitparade)	86

=== Decade-end charts ===
Decade-end chart performance for "Demons"
Chart (2010–2019)	Position
US Hot Rock Songs (Billboard)	23

== Certifications ==
Certifications and sales for "Demons"
Region	Certification	Certified units/sales
Australia (ARIA)	6× Platinum	420,000^{‡}
Austria (IFPI Austria)	Platinum	30,000^{*}
Brazil (Pro-Música Brasil)	4× Diamond	1,000,000^{‡}
Brazil (Pro-Música Brasil) Live In Vegas	Platinum	60,000^{‡}
Canada (Music Canada)	8× Platinum	640,000^{‡}
Denmark (IFPI Danmark)	3× Platinum	270,000^{‡}
Germany (BVMI)	3× Gold	450,000^{‡}
Italy (FIMI)	5× Platinum	250,000^{‡}
Mexico (AMPROFON)	Platinum+Gold	90,000^{*}
New Zealand (RMNZ)	6× Platinum	180,000^{‡}
Norway (IFPI Norway)	Gold	5,000^{*}
Portugal (AFP)	6× Platinum	60,000^{‡}
Spain (Promusicae)	4× Platinum	240,000^{‡}
Sweden (GLF)	4× Platinum	160,000^{‡}
Switzerland (IFPI Switzerland)	Gold	15,000^{^}
United Kingdom (BPI)	4× Platinum	2,400,000^{‡}
United States (RIAA)	12× Platinum	12,000,000^{‡}
Streaming
Denmark (IFPI Danmark)	2× Platinum	5,200,000^{†}
Greece (IFPI Greece)	Platinum	2,000,000^{†}
Norway (IFPI Norway)	2× Platinum	6,000,000^{†}
Spain (Promusicae)	Platinum	8,000,000^{†}
^{*} Sales figures based on certification alone.^{^} Shipments figures based on certification alone.^{‡} Sales+streaming figures based on certification alone.^{†} Streaming-only figures based on certification alone.

== Accolades ==
Year	Ceremony	Award	Result
2014	Billboard Music Awards	Top Rock Song	Nominated
2014	iHeartRadio Music Awards	Alternative Rock Song of the Year	Won
2014	MTV Video Music Awards	Best Rock Video	Nominated
2014	MuchMusic Video Awards	International Video of the Year – Group	Won

Publication	Country	Accolade	Year	Rank
Nielsen SoundScan	United States	The 15 Most Downloaded Songs in Rock History	2015	8

== Release history ==
Release dates for "Demons"
Country	Date	Format	Label
United States	January 28, 2013	Adult album alternative radio	Interscope Records
United States	April 1, 2013	Modern rock radio	Interscope Records
United States	September 16, 2013	Hot adult contemporary radio	Interscope Records
United States	September 17, 2013	Contemporary hit radio	Interscope Records
Mexico	October 22, 2013	Digital download (remixes)	Interscope Records; KIDinaKORNER
United States	October 22, 2013	Digital download (remixes)	Interscope Records; KIDinaKORNER
Italy	November 29, 2013	Contemporary hit radio	Universal Music

== Personnel ==
- Dan Reynolds – lead vocals
- Daniel Wayne Sermon – guitars, backing vocals
- Ben McKee – bass, keyboards, backing vocals
- Daniel Platzman – drums, backing vocals

=== Additional musicians ===
- J Brownz – additional guitar, additional bass
