= Ben McKee =

American musician (born 1985)

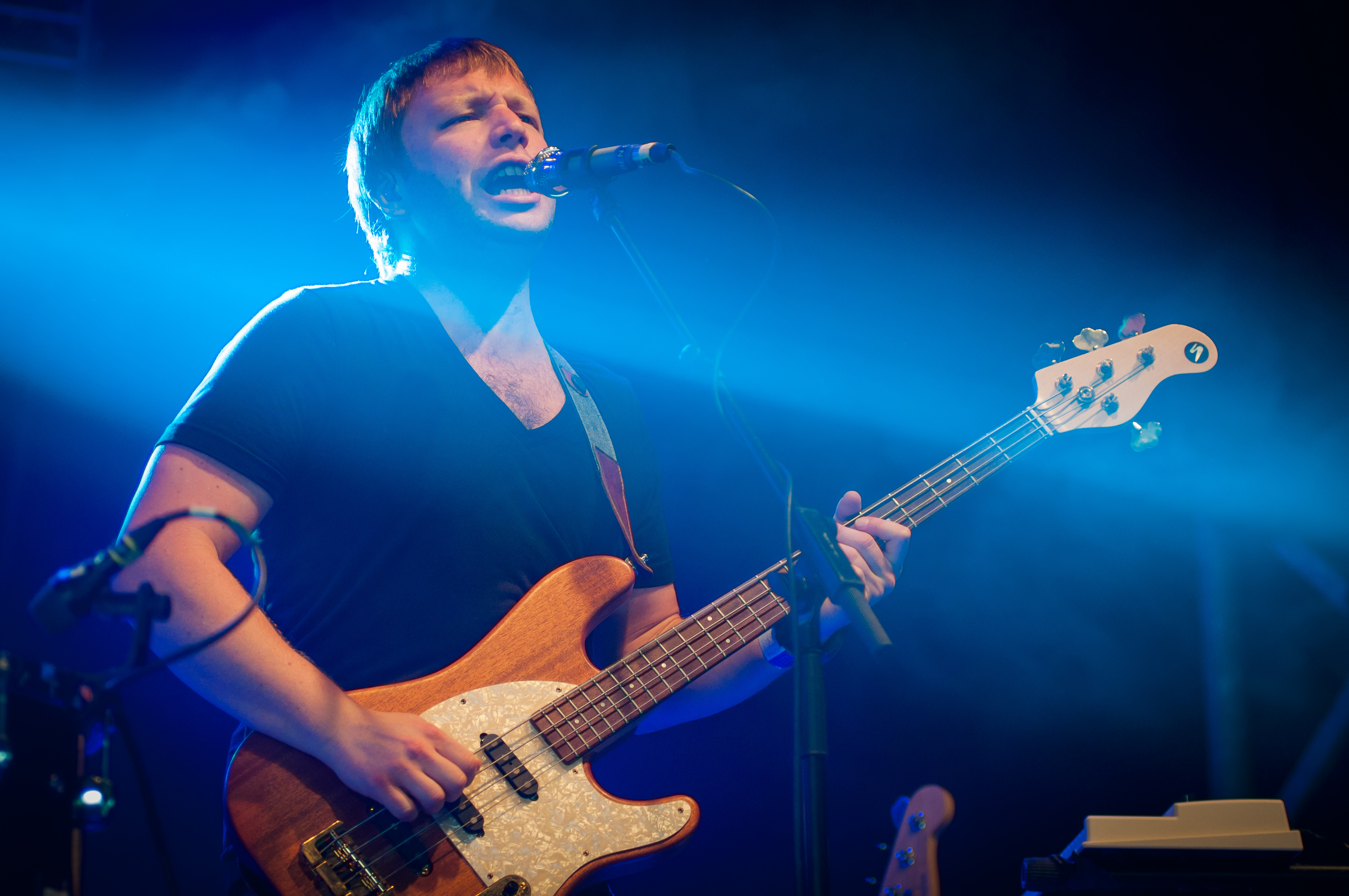
- McKee performing in 2013

Background information
- Born: Benjamin Arthur McKee; April 7, 1985 (age 41); Forestville, California, U.S.
- Genres: Alternative rock; indie rock; pop rock; indie pop; electropop
- Occupations: Musician; songwriter; record producer
- Instruments: Bass; vocals; keyboards
- Years active: 2009–present
- Labels: Interscope; Kidinakorner
- Member of: Imagine Dragons
- Spouse: Mary (m. 2023)
- McKee's voice On the culture of Chile

Benjamin Arthur McKee (born April 7, 1985) is an American musician, songwriter, and record producer. He is the bassist for the pop rock band Imagine Dragons.

== Early life ==
McKee was raised in Forestville, California, and graduated from El Molino High School. He grew up playing acoustic guitar and violin, before picking up acoustic bass in fifth grade. In high school, he continued learning bass guitar as a member of a jazz trio, which influenced his decision to attend Berklee College of Music. While at Berklee, McKee played in a guitar performance ensemble with future Imagine Dragons bandmates Wayne Sermon and Daniel Platzman.

== Career ==
In 2009, McKee was invited by Wayne Sermon to join Imagine Dragons, based out of Las Vegas. McKee dropped out of his final semester at Berklee to join the band, inviting Daniel Platzman to play drums, completing the lineup. The band relocated to Las Vegas performing and honing their craft nearly nightly as a lounge act. The band proceeded to earn a number of local accolades including "Best CD of 2011" (Vegas SEVEN), "Best Local Indie Band 2010" (Las Vegas Weekly), and "Las Vegas' Newest Must See Live Act" (Las Vegas CityLife). In November 2011 they signed with Interscope Records and began working with producer Alex da Kid.

In 2012 their debut album Night Visions brought the band mainstream success. It reached #2 on the Billboard 200 chart and won the Billboard Music Award for Best Rock Album (2014). Single "It's Time" became the band's first single reaching #15 Billboard Hot 100 and certified multi-platinum by the RIAA. Second single "Radioactive" reached #3 Billboard Hot 100 and was certified diamond by the RIAA, becoming the best selling rock song in the history of Nielsen SoundScan. Third single "Demons" reached #6 Billboard Hot 100 and was certified multi-platinum by the RIAA. Their album made the highest debut for a new rock band in six years (since 2006) and single Radioactive set a new record for longest time atop the Billboard Hot Rock Songs chart with 23 consecutive weeks. Tracks from the album topped the Billboard Rock Songs, Billboard Alternative Songs, and Billboard Pop Songs charts. Radioactive was also nominated for two Grammy Awards, winning the Grammy Award for Best Rock Performance. In 2015, Imagine Dragons' second album Smoke + Mirrors reached #1 on the Billboard 200, UK Albums Chart, and Canadian Albums Chart. Singles include "I Bet My Life", "Gold", and "Shots".

Since then, the band has released four more albums: Evolve (2017), Origins (2018), Mercury - Acts 1 & 2 (2022), and Loom (2024). Imagine Dragons has also contributed songs to several film soundtracks, including "Ready Aim Fire" for Iron Man 3, "Who We Are" for Hunger Games: Catching Fire and "Battle Cry" for Transformers: Age of Extinction. In addition, in September 2014, "Warriors" was released by Riot Games along with an animated music video promoting the League of Legends World Championships. They also collaborated with Riot Games and J.I.D and in October 2021 released Enemy, the theme song of Arcane, the League of Legends animated TV series. In August 2023, a collaboration with Bethesda Softworks produced Children of the Sky, a song using the theme of and inspired by Starfield.

== Philanthropy ==
In February 2021, McKee pledged to donate $1,000 a day to worthy causes for a year. Some of his donations have been to causes that aid Latino families (UndocuFund), that mentor LGBTQIA+ youth (Positive Images), food providers (Redwood Empire Food Bank and Food for Thought), and wildlife rescue (Bird Rescue Center).

== Personal life ==
In 2023, McKee married long term partner Mary. They have two children together - a daughter, Calliope, born in 2024, and a son, Forrest, born in 2026.
