= Daniel Platzman =

American drummer and songwriter

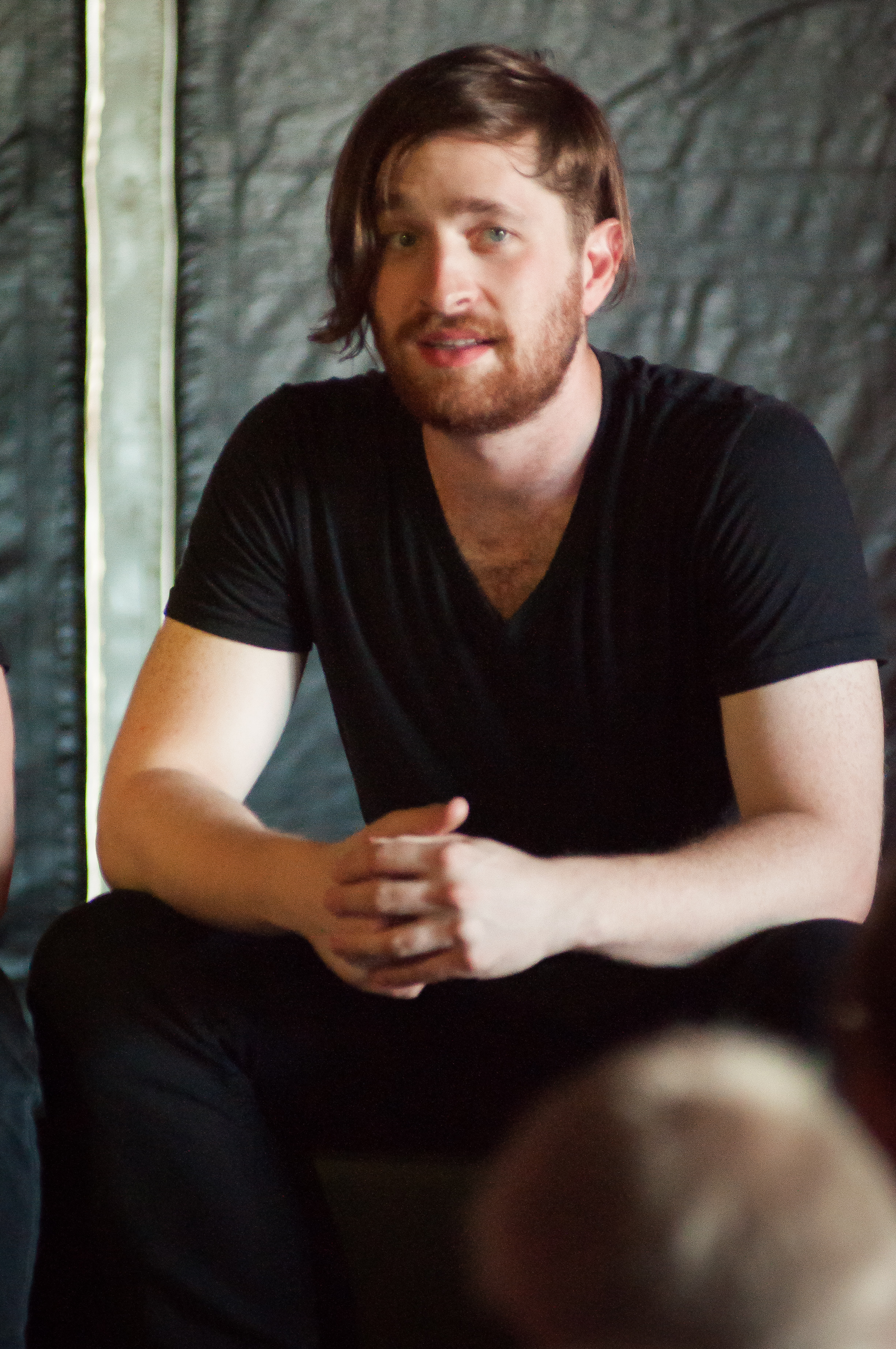
- Platzman during an interview in Joensuu, Finland, July 2013

Background information
- Born: Daniel James Platzman; September 28, 1986 (age 40); Atlanta, Georgia, U.S.
- Origin: Las Vegas, Nevada, U.S.
- Genres: Alternative rock; indie rock; pop rock; indie pop; electropop
- Occupations: Musician; songwriter; record producer; composer
- Instruments: Drums; percussion
- Years active: 2011–present
- Labels: Interscope Records; Kidinakorner
- Formerly of: Imagine Dragons
- Website: danielplatzman.com
- Platzman's voice On choosing tracks for Imagine Dragons' album Mercury (Act 1 (2021) and Act 2 (2022))

Daniel James Platzman (born September 28, 1986) is an American musician, songwriter, record producer, and composer. He is best known as the former drummer for the pop rock band Imagine Dragons.

== Early life ==
Platzman was born on September 28, 1986 in Atlanta. He attended Berklee College of Music in Boston, where he earned a degree in film scoring. While at Berklee, he played in the Berklee Concert Jazz Orchestra, the Urban Outreach Jazz Orchestra, and the Berklee Rainbow Big Band. He also received the Vic Firth Award for Outstanding Musicianship and the Michael Rendish Award in Film Scoring there. He played in a guitar performance ensemble at Berklee with future Imagine Dragons bandmates Wayne Sermon and Ben McKee.

== Career ==
=== Imagine Dragons ===
In 2011, Platzman was invited by Sermon to join Imagine Dragons, based in Las Vegas. During his senior year, McKee dropped out of his final semester at Berklee to join the band, inviting Platzman to play drums, completing the lineup. The band proceeded to earn a number of local accolades including "Best CD of 2011" (Vegas SEVEN), "Best Local Indie Band 2010" (Las Vegas Weekly), "Las Vegas' Newest Must See Live Act" (Las Vegas CityLife), and other awards sending the band on a trajectory of success. In November 2011 they signed with Interscope Records and began working with Alex da Kid, a British producer.

In 2012, their debut album Night Visions brought the band mainstream success. It reached No. 2 on the Billboard 200 chart and won the Billboard Music Award for Best Rock Album (2014). The single "It's Time" was the band's first single in the Billboard Hot 100, reaching No. 15, and certified multi-platinum by the RIAA. Another single, "Radioactive" was No. 3 on the Billboard Hot 100 and certified diamond, becoming the best selling rock song in the history of Nielsen SoundScan. "Demons", a third single, was No. 6 on the Billboard Hot 100 and it was certified multi-platinum by the RIAA. The album was the highest debut for a new rock band in six years (since 2006) and "Radioactive" set a new record for the longest time atop the Billboard Hot Rock Songs chart with 23 consecutive weeks on the chart. Tracks from the album topped the Billboard Rock Songs, Billboard Alternative Songs, and Billboard Pop Songs charts. "Radioactive" was nominated for two Grammy Awards, winning the Grammy Award for Best Rock Performance.

In 2015, Imagine Dragons' second album Smoke + Mirrors reached No. 1 on the Billboard 200, UK Albums Chart, and Canadian Albums Chart. It features singles "I Bet My Life", "Shots", and "Gold". The band has contributed songs to several film soundtracks including "Ready Aim Fire" for Iron Man 3, "Who We Are" for The Hunger Games: Catching Fire (2013), "Battle Cry" for Transformers: Age of Extinction (2014), and "Not Today" for Me Before You (2016). In September 2014, "Warriors" was released by Riot Games with an animated music video promoting the League of Legends World Championship. Platzman appeared on the cover of Drum! magazine's March 2015 issue. He was profiled again in Drum! in May 2015. On March 3, 2023, he released his first single as a solo artist, titled "Show Me That You Want Me", accompanied with a music video.

Platzman announced that he was leaving the band on August 21, 2024, after previously announcing an indefinite hiatus and removing himself from band activities.

=== Film and television scoring ===
Platzman studied film scoring at Berklee College of Music. He composed the original score for the 2014 season of Africa Investigates, the award-winning investigative documentary series on Al Jazeera English produced by Insight TWI. Africa Investigates is the first internationally broadcast documentary series fronted exclusively by African investigative journalists. Platzman contributed music to the film Best F(r)iends (2017) and scored a short film, "Eagles are Turning People Into Horses: The Movie" by Nick Kocher and Brian McElhaney.

== Discography ==
- Show Me That You Want Me (2023)
- Chairman of the Clowns (2023)

== Awards ==
- Vic Firth Award for Outstanding Musicianship, Berklee College of Music
- Michael Rendish Award in Film Scoring, Berklee
