= Wayne Sermon =

American musician and songwriter (born 1984)

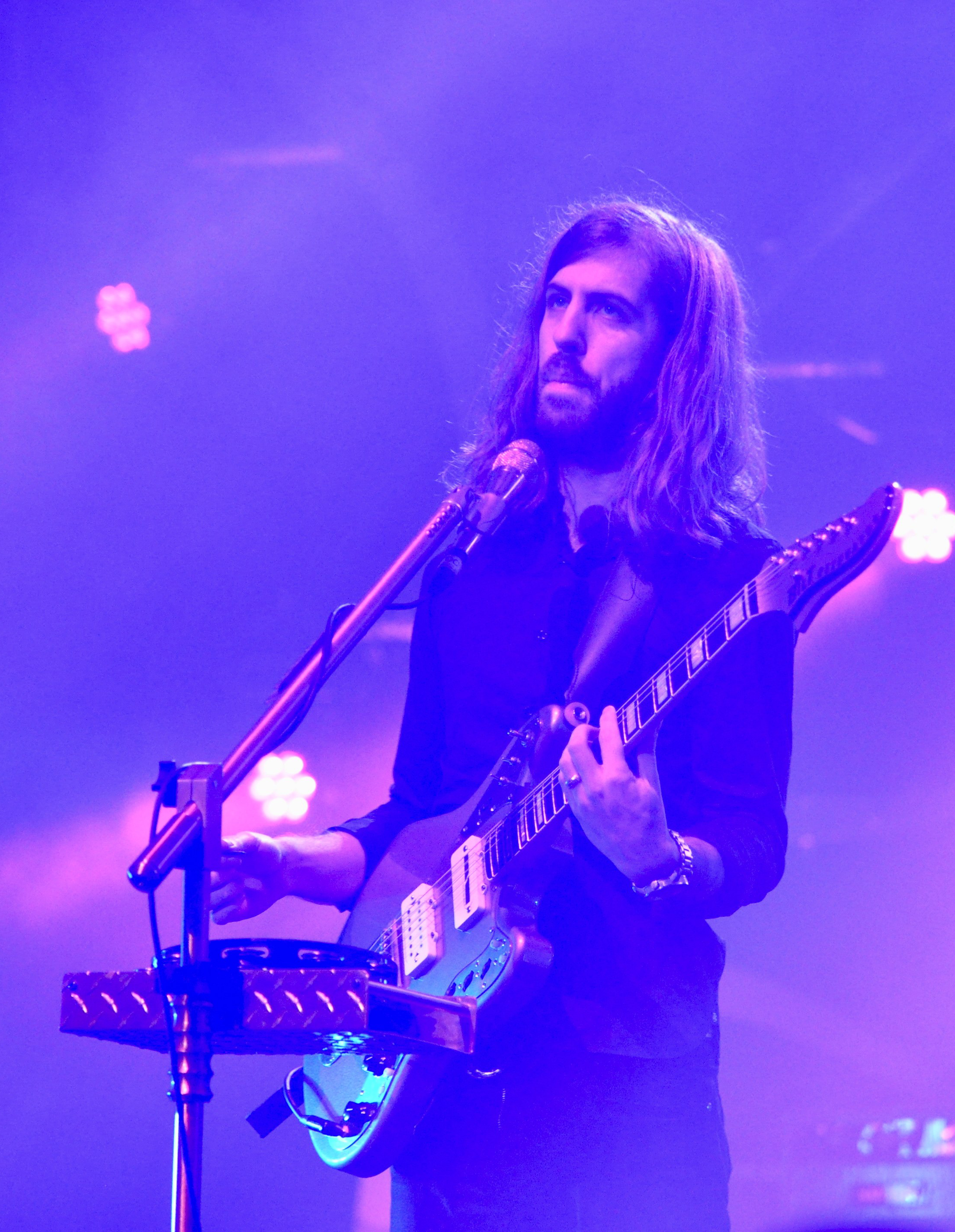
- Sermon performing in 2016

Background information
- Born: Daniel Wayne Sermon; June 15, 1984 (age 42); American Fork, Utah, U.S.
- Genres: Alternative rock; indie rock; pop rock; indie pop; electropop
- Occupations: Musician; songwriter; record producer
- Instruments: Guitar; vocals; mandolin; violin
- Years active: 2009–present
- Labels: Interscope; Kidinakorner
- Member of: Imagine Dragons
- Website: imaginedragonsmusic.com
- Sermon's voice On the emotional effects of touring

Daniel Wayne Sermon (born June 15, 1984) is an American musician, songwriter, and record producer. He is the lead guitarist for the pop rock band Imagine Dragons.

== Early life ==
Sermon was born on June 15, 1984, in American Fork, Utah, to parents Jeff and Debbie Sermon. He attended Berklee College of Music where he double majored in guitar performance and composition, graduating in 2008. While at Berklee he was part of a five-guitar jazz fusion ensemble called The Eclectic Electrics.

== Career ==
Wayne Sermon first met Imagine Dragons frontman Dan Reynolds after hearing him perform at a club in Utah and approaching him afterwards about his musical interests. Reynolds invited him to join his band and move to Las Vegas. Sermon then invited Ben McKee to join the band on bass, and drummer Daniel Platzman, also a friend of Wayne from Berklee College of Music, became the last member to join the group. In Las Vegas, the band performed and honed their craft nearly nightly as a lounge act. Vegas Music Summit Headliner 2010, and more sent the band on a positive trajectory. In November 2011 they signed with Interscope Records and began working with producer Alex da Kid.

In 2012 their debut album Night Visions brought the band mainstream success. It reached 2 on the Billboard 200 chart and won the Billboard Music Award for Best Rock Album (2014). Single "It's Time" became the band's first single reaching #15 Billboard Hot 100 and certified multi-platinum by the RIAA. Second single "Radioactive" reached #3 Billboard Hot 100 and was certified diamond by the RIAA, becoming the best selling rock song in the history of Nielsen SoundScan. Third single "Demons" reached #6 Billboard Hot 100 and was certified multi-platinum by the RIAA. Their album made the highest debut for a new rock band in six years (since 2006) and single Radioactive set a record for longest time atop the Billboard Hot Rock Songs chart with 23 consecutive weeks. Tracks from the album topped the Billboard Rock Songs, Billboard Alternative Songs, and Billboard Pop Songs charts. Radioactive was also nominated for two Grammy Awards, winning the Grammy Award for Best Rock Performance. Singles include "I Bet My Life" and "Shots".

== Personal life ==
Sermon is one of five children of his parents and grew up a member of the Church of Jesus Christ of Latter-day Saints but has since left the church.

Sermon has chronic insomnia and will often record songs during the middle of the night, sleeping only a couple of hours a day.

== Playing style and musicianship ==
Sermon has described his playing style as textural.

As a youth, Sermon learned to play both cello and guitar. He was determined to be a guitarist even as a child. His father had an audio-phile quality amplifier, a record player, and all of The Beatles albums on vinyl, which Sermon enjoyed listening to. He also loved the sounds of Tom Scholz (of Boston) and his approach to solos.

== Equipment ==
=== Electric guitars ===
- BilT Electric Guitar with built-in effects
- Gibson Jeff Tweedy Signature SG
- Elixir Strings

=== Acoustic guitars ===
- Gibson J-45
- Gibson Honky Tonk Deuce

=== Sound equipment ===
- Line 6 M9 Stompbox Modeler
- Vintage Vox AC30 Amps with Top Boost Kit from Plexi Palace
- Friedman Smallbox 50 with 65 Amp 2x12 Whiskey cabinet
