= Imagine Dragons discography =

Discography of Imagine Dragons

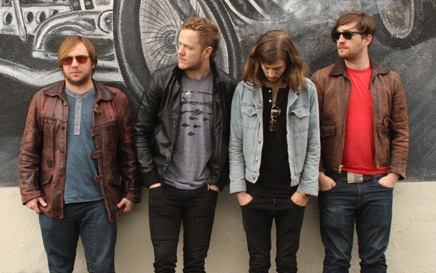
- Imagine Dragons on the set of their performance on Walmart Soundcheck
- Studio albums: 6
- Extended plays: 12
- Live albums: 5
- Compilation albums: 1
- Singles: 43
- Music videos: 50
- Promotional singles: 8

The American pop rock band Imagine Dragons has released six studio albums, five live albums, one compilation album, twelve extended plays, forty-three singles, eight promotional singles and fifty music videos. According to Recording Industry Association of America, they have sold 111.5 million digital singles and 16 million albums in the US. Imagine Dragons has sold 46 million albums and 55 million singles worldwide, including 74 billion global career streams, making them among the best-selling rock bands in history. Billboard named them as the 29th Greatest Adult Alternative artist of all time, as well as the 13th Top Artist of 2010s in the United States.

Imagine Dragons released their first extended play, Speak to Me in February 2009, only to break up shortly after. Following a lineup change, the band reformed and a few months later would release their self-titled EP in August 2009. After teasing new songs periodically on MySpace, their third EP Hell and Silence released in March 2010. While touring Hell and Silence, the band wrote new material on the road and would debut new songs at live shows with the mentality of prioritizing songs that received the most positive feedback. Their fourth EP It's Time released in March 2011, which drew the attention of Alex Da Kid, who liked the band's material and offered to produce and sign them to his label Kidinakorner. Under their new label, the band found commercial success with the release of their fifth extended play, Continued Silence, in February 2012. "It's Time" was released as the lead single from the EP, peaking at number fifteen on the United States Billboard Hot 100. It has since sold over 6 million copies in the United States. Continued Silence went on to peak at number 40 on the Billboard 200 in the United States. As of August 31, 2021, Imagine Dragons are also one of the highest certified digital singles acts in the United States by the Recording Industry Association of America (RIAA), having been certified for 114.5 million digital singles in the country alone.

Night Visions, the band's debut studio album, was released in September 2012; it peaked at number two on the Billboard 200 and topped the Billboard Top Alternative Albums and Billboard Top Rock Albums charts. In addition to "It's Time", the album also contains the singles "Radioactive" and "Demons". The former single peaked at number three on the Billboard Hot 100 and has since sold over 8.6 million copies in the United States. It also became a top–ten hit in numerous countries, such as Australia, Germany and Sweden. "Demons" has also been certified Diamond by the RIAA and peaked at number six on the Billboard Hot 100.

The band's second studio album, Smoke + Mirrors, was released in February 2015, debuting at the top of the Billboard 200. The album was preceded by 3 singles: "I Bet My Life", which peaked in the top 40 of the Billboard Hot 100 at number 28, "Gold", and "Shots". "I Bet My Life" and "Shots" both peaked within the top 10 on Billboard's Hot Rock and Alternative chart.

The band followed this with their third studio album, Evolve, in June 2017. The record was preceded by two singles, "Believer" and Thunder", which both went on to peak at number four on the Billboard Hot 100. "Believer" was later certified diamond by the RIAA. They were then followed by a third single, "Whatever It Takes", which reached number 12. All three songs have peaked at number one on the Hot Rock Songs chart. After the Evolve tour was completed, they released their fourth studio album Origins on November 9, 2018. Five singles were released from the album: "Natural", "Zero", "Machine", "Bad Liar", and "Birds" featuring Elisa.

After taking a break of more than two years, the band announced their fifth studio album, Mercury – Act 1, which was released on September 3, 2021. The album was preceded by three singles: "Follow You", "Cutthroat", and "Wrecked". "Follow You" peaked at number 7 on the Hot Rock and Alternative chart and number one on Rock and Alternative Airplay, and also received an alternate version titled "Follow You (Summer '21)".

== Albums ==
=== Studio albums ===
List of studio albums, with selected chart positions, sales figures and certifications
Title	Album details	Peak chart positions										Sales	Certifications
Title	Album details	US	US Rock	AUS	CAN	FRA	GER	ITA	NZ	SWI	UK	Sales	Certifications
Night Visions	Released: September 4, 2012 (US); Label: Interscope, Kidinakorner; Formats: CD, DL, LP	2	1	4	3	15	6	18	5	9	2	US: 2,400,000; CAN: 357,000; UK: 542,676	RIAA: 8× Platinum; ARIA: Platinum; BPI: 2× Platinum; BVMI: 3× Gold; FIMI: 3× Platinum; IFPI SWI: Platinum; MC: 7× Platinum; RMNZ: 5× Platinum; SNEP: Platinum
Smoke + Mirrors	Released: February 17, 2015 (US); Label: Interscope, Kidinakorner; Formats: CD, DL, LP	1	1	4	1	9	3	6	4	3	1	US: 500,000; CAN: 66,000; UK: 180,460	RIAA: 2× Platinum; BPI: Platinum; BVMI: Gold; FIMI: Gold; MC: Platinum; RMNZ: 2× Platinum
Evolve	Released: June 23, 2017; Label: Interscope, Kidinakorner; Formats: CD, DL, LP	2	1	4	1	3	3	3	3	1	3	US: 703,000	RIAA: 4× Platinum; BPI: Platinum; BVMI: 3× Gold; FIMI: 3× Platinum; MC: 2× Platinum; RMNZ: 6× Platinum; SNEP: Diamond
Origins	Released: November 9, 2018; Label: Interscope, Kidinakorner; Formats: CD, DL, LP, CS	2	1	4	1	5	6	5	3	2	9	US: 61,000	RIAA: Platinum; BPI: Gold; BVMI: Gold; FIMI: Platinum; RMNZ: 2× Platinum; SNEP: 2× Platinum
Mercury – Act 1	Released: September 3, 2021; Label: Interscope, Kidinakorner; Formats: CD, DL, LP, CS	9	2	10	4	4	5	8	11	4	7	US: 17,000	BPI: Gold; FIMI: Platinum; MC: Platinum; SNEP: 2× Platinum
Loom	Released: June 28, 2024; Label: Interscope, Kidinakorner; Formats: CD, DL, LP, CS	22	5	17	23	1	2	9	12	1	5		SNEP: Gold

=== Reissue albums ===
List of reissue albums, with selected chart positions
Title	Album details	Peak chart positions						Certifications
Title	Album details	AUS	FRA	GER	ITA	NZ	SWI	Certifications
Mercury – Acts 1 & 2	Released: July 1, 2022; Label: Interscope, Kidinakorner; Formats: CD, DL	13	4	6	7	25	1	RIAA: Platinum; RMNZ: Platinum
Night Visions Expanded Edition	Released: September 9, 2022; Label: Interscope, Kidinakorner; Formats: CD, LP, digital download	—	—	—	—	—	—	
"—" denotes a recording that did not chart or was not released in that territory.

=== Live albums ===
List of live albums, with selected chart positions
Title	Album details	Peak chart positions	
Title	Album details	BEL (FL)	BEL (WA)
Live at Independent Records	Released: April 20, 2013 (US); Label: Interscope; Formats: CD	—	—
Night Visions Live	Released: February 25, 2014 (CAN); Label: Interscope; Formats: CD+DVD-V, DL	159	110
Smoke + Mirrors Live	Released: June 3, 2016; Label: Interscope, Kidinakorner; Formats: CD+DVD-V	178	—
Imagine Dragons: Live in Vegas	Released: July 28, 2023; Label: Interscope, Kidinakorner; Formats: CD, DL, LP	—	—
Imagine Dragons (Amazon Music Songline)	Released: October 11, 2024; Label: Interscope, Kidinakorner; Formats: DL, LP	—	—
"—" denotes a recording that did not chart or was not released in that territory.

=== Compilation albums ===
List of compilation albums
Title	Album details
Reflections (from the Vault of Smoke + Mirrors)	Releasing: February 21, 2025; Label: Interscope, Kidinakorner; Formats: DL, LP

== Extended plays ==
List of extended plays, with selected chart positions and certifications
Title	Details	Peak chart positions					Certifications
Title	Details	US	US Alt.	US Rock	IRL	SWE	Certifications
Imagine Dragons	Released: August 24, 2009 (US); Label: Interscope (reissue); Formats: CD, DL	—	—	—	—	—	
Hell and Silence	Released: March 12, 2010 (US); Label: Interscope (reissue); Formats: CD, DL	—	—	—	—	—	
It's Time	Released: March 12, 2011 (US); Label: Interscope (reissue); Formats: CD, DL	—	—	—	—	—	
Continued Silence	Released: February 14, 2012 (US); Label: Interscope; Formats: CD, DL	40	8	11	86	20	BPI: Gold
Hear Me	Released: November 25, 2012 (UK); Label: Interscope; Formats: CD, DL	—	—	—	—	—	
The Archive	Released: February 12, 2013 (US); Label: Interscope; Formats: DL	134	24	35	—	—	
iTunes Session	Released: May 28, 2013 (US); Label: Interscope; Formats: DL	56	13	17	—	—	
Imagine Dragons (Live London Sessions)	Released: July 6, 2013 (UK); Label: Interscope; Formats: Streamed audio	—	—	—	—	—	
Imagine Dragons (Spotify Sessions)	Released: April 20, 2015; Label: Interscope; Formats: Streamed audio	—	—	—	—	—	
Shots EP	Released: May 4, 2015; Label: Interscope; Formats: DL	—	—	—	—	—	
Live at AllSaints Studios	Released: August 4, 2017 (US); Label: Interscope; Formats: DL	—	—	—	—	—	
Mercury – Act 1 (Amazon Music Live)	Released: November 19, 2021 (US); Label: Interscope; Formats: DL	—	—	—	—	—	
"—" denotes a recording that did not chart or was not released in that territory.

== Singles ==
=== As lead artist ===
List of singles, showing title, year of release, selected chart positions, certifications and parent album name
Title	Year	Peak chart positions										Certifications	Album
Title	Year	US	US Rock	AUS	CAN	FRA	GER	ITA	NZ	SWI	UK	Certifications	Album
"It's Time"	2012	15	3	27	30	101	20	—	37	38	23	RIAA: 7× Platinum; ARIA: 2× Platinum; BPI: Platinum; BVMI: Platinum; FIMI: Platinum; IFPI SWI: Gold; MC: 3× Platinum; RMNZ: 2× Platinum	Night Visions
"Radioactive"	2012	3	1	6	5	28	4	47	4	5	12	RIAA: 17× Platinum; ARIA: 10× Platinum; BPI: 4× Platinum; BVMI: 4× Platinum; FIMI: 4× Platinum; IFPI SWI: Platinum; MC: Diamond; RMNZ: 7× Platinum	Night Visions
"Hear Me"	2012	—	26	—	—	—	—	—	—	—	37	RIAA: Gold	Night Visions
"Demons"	2013	6	2	11	4	15	15	4	12	8	13	RIAA: 12× Platinum; ARIA: 6× Platinum; BPI: 4× Platinum; BVMI: 3× Gold; FIMI: 5× Platinum; IFPI SWI: Gold; MC: 8× Platinum; RMNZ: 6× Platinum	Night Visions
"On Top of the World"	2013	79	10	10	43	35	13	10	10	14	34	RIAA: 5× Platinum; ARIA: 3× Platinum; BPI: 2× Platinum; BVMI: Platinum; FIMI: 2× Platinum; IFPI SWI: Gold; MC: 2× Platinum; RMNZ: 4× Platinum	Night Visions
"Monster" (Note: "Monster" also features on the soundtrack of the 2013 game, Infinity Blade III.)	2013	78	13	—	41	—	—	—	—	—	—	RIAA: Platinum	Smoke + Mirrors
"Battle Cry" (Note: "Battle Cry" also features on the soundtrack of the 2014 film, Transformers: Age of Extinction.)	2014	—	24	—	—	—	—	—	—	—	—	RIAA: Gold	Smoke + Mirrors
"Warriors"	2014	— (Note: "Warriors" did not enter the Billboard Hot 100, but peaked at number two on the Bubbling Under Hot 100 Singles chart, which acts as a quasi-extension to the Hot 100.)	10	—	60	—	—	—	—	—	—	RIAA: 2× Platinum; BPI: Platinum; RMNZ: Platinum	Smoke + Mirrors
"I Bet My Life"	2014	28	3	36	15	42	65	—	28	71	27	RIAA: 3× Platinum; BPI: Gold; FIMI: Platinum; MC: 3× Platinum; RMNZ: Gold	Smoke + Mirrors
"Gold"	2014	—	12	—	—	—	—	—	—	—	—	RIAA: Gold	Smoke + Mirrors
"Shots"	2015	75	7	66	72	170	60	69	—	—	91	RIAA: Platinum; BPI: Gold; BVMI: Gold; FIMI: Platinum; RMNZ: Platinum	Smoke + Mirrors
"Roots" (Note: "Roots" is included on the Japanese deluxe edition of Evolve.)	2015	77	5	—	—	—	—	—	—	—	127	RIAA: Platinum	Non-album single
"I Was Me"	2015	— (Note: "I Was Me" did not enter the Billboard Hot 100, but peaked at number 46 on the Digital Song Sales chart.)	17	—	— (Note: "I Was Me" did not enter the Billboard Canadian Hot 100, but peaked at number 37 on the Canadian Digital Song Sales chart.)	82	—	—	—	—	—		Non-album charity single
"Not Today" (Note: "Not Today" is also included on the deluxe edition of Evolve.)	2016	—	17	—	—	—	—	—	—	—	—		Me Before You
"Sucker for Pain" (with Lil Wayne, Wiz Khalifa, Ty Dolla $ign, and Logic featuring X Ambassadors)	2016	15	3	7	19	18	8	19	5	16	11	RIAA: 3× Platinum; ARIA: Platinum; BPI: Platinum; BVMI: Platinum; FIMI: 2× Platinum; IFPI SWI: Gold; RMNZ: 3× Platinum; SNEP: Platinum	Suicide Squad: The Album
"Levitate" (Note: "Levitate" is also included on the deluxe edition of Evolve.)	2016	—	19	—	— (Note: "Levitate" did not enter the Billboard Canadian Hot 100, but peaked at number 30 on the Canadian Digital Song Sales chart.)	—	—	—	—	—	—		Passengers
"Believer"	2017	4	1	33	7	7	23	5	21	6	42	RIAA: 14× Platinum; ARIA: 15× Platinum; BPI: 4× Platinum; BVMI: Diamond; FIMI: 5× Platinum; MC: 7× Platinum; RMNZ: 9× Platinum; SNEP: Diamond	Evolve
"Thunder"	2017	4	1	2	4	20	2	5	3	2	20	RIAA: 13× Platinum; ARIA: 17× Platinum; BPI: 4× Platinum; BVMI: 3× Platinum; FIMI: 5× Platinum; MC: 6× Platinum; RMNZ: 9× Platinum; SNEP: Diamond	Evolve
"Whatever It Takes"	2017	12	1	34	26	13	7	9	— (Note: "Whatever It Takes" did not enter the NZ Top 40 Singles Chart, but peaked at number five on the NZ Heatseeker Singles Chart.)	6	93	RIAA: 7× Platinum; ARIA: Platinum; BPI: Platinum; BVMI: 3× Gold; FIMI: 3× Platinum; MC: 2× Platinum; RMNZ: 4× Platinum; SNEP: Platinum	Evolve
"Next to Me" (Note: "Next to Me" is included only on the 2018 digital re-issue of Evolve.)	2018	— (Note: "Next to Me" did not enter the Billboard Hot 100, but peaked at number ten on the Bubbling Under Hot 100 chart, which acts as a quasi-extension to the Hot 100.)	7	96	68	19	—	21	— (Note: "Next to Me" did not enter the NZ Top 40 Singles Chart, but peaked at number three on the NZ Heatseeker Singles Chart.)	51	98	RIAA: Gold; BPI: Silver; FIMI: Platinum; RMNZ: Gold; SNEP: Gold	Evolve
"Born to Be Yours" (Note: "Born to Be Yours" is included only on the international deluxe edition of Origins.) (with Kygo)	2018	74	—	18	31	14	22	44	22	5	54	ARIA: 2× Platinum; BPI: Silver; BVMI: Gold; FIMI: Platinum; IFPI SWI: Platinum; MC: 2× Platinum; RMNZ: 2× Platinum; SNEP: Gold	Origins
"Natural"	2018	13	1	28	12	55	16	48	37	3	49	RIAA: 6× Platinum; BPI: Platinum; BVMI: Platinum; FIMI: Platinum; MC: Platinum; RMNZ: 2× Platinum; SNEP: Gold	Origins
"Zero" (Note: "Zero" also features on the soundtrack of the 2018 film, Ralph Breaks the Internet.)	2018	— (Note: "Zero" did not enter the Billboard Hot 100, but peaked at number 24 on the Digital Song Sales chart.)	9	—	— (Note: "Zero" did not enter the Billboard Canadian Hot 100, but peaked at number 29 on the Canadian Digital Song Sales chart.)	—	—	22	— (Note: "Zero" did not enter the NZ Top 40 Singles Chart, but peaked at number 18 on the NZ Hot Singles Chart.)	76	—	RIAA: Platinum; BPI: Silver	Origins
"Machine"	2018	— (Note: "Machine" did not enter the Billboard Hot 100, but peaked at number 46 on the Digital Song Sales chart.)	17	—	— (Note: "Machine" did not enter the Billboard Canadian Hot 100, but peaked at number 44 on the Canadian Digital Song Sales chart.)	—	—	—	— (Note: "Machine" did not enter the NZ Top 40 Singles Chart, but peaked at number 16 on the NZ Hot Singles Chart.)	—	—	RIAA: Gold	Origins
"Bad Liar"	2018	56	2	20	50	41	16	16	16	4	44	RIAA: 2× Platinum; ARIA: Platinum; BPI: Platinum; BVMI: Platinum; FIMI: 2× Platinum; MC: Platinum; RMNZ: 3× Platinum; SNEP: Platinum	Origins
"Birds" (Note: "Birds" is only included on the deluxe edition of Origins.) (original or featuring Elisa)	2019	—	30	—	—	49	—	61	—	30	—	RIAA: Gold; FIMI: Platinum; RMNZ: Gold; SNEP: Platinum	Origins
"Follow You"	2021	68	7	—	47	41	49	28	— (Note: "Follow You" did not enter the NZ Top 40 Singles Chart, but peaked at number five on the NZ Hot Singles Chart.)	23	100	RIAA: Platinum; BPI: Silver; BVMI: Gold; FIMI: Platinum; MC: 2× Platinum; RMNZ: Gold; SNEP: Diamond	Mercury – Act 1
"Cutthroat"	2021	—	28	—	—	—	—	—	— (Note: "Cutthroat" did not enter the NZ Top 40 Singles Chart, but peaked at number 40 on the NZ Hot Singles Chart.)	—	—		Mercury – Act 1
"Wrecked"	2021	— (Note: "Wrecked" did not enter the Billboard Hot 100, but peaked at number 11 on the Bubbling Under Hot 100 chart, which acts as a quasi-extension to the Hot 100.)	11	—	91	38	75	77	— (Note: "Wrecked" did not enter the NZ Top 40 Singles Chart, but peaked at number six on the NZ Hot Singles Chart.)	10	—	RIAA: Gold; FIMI: Platinum; MC: Platinum; RMNZ: Gold; SNEP: Diamond	Mercury – Act 1
"Monday"	2021	—	28	—	—	—	—	—	— (Note: "Monday" did not enter the NZ Top 40 Singles Chart, but peaked at number 17 on the NZ Hot Singles Chart.)	—	—		Mercury – Act 1
"Enemy" (Note: "Enemy" also features on the soundtrack of the series, Arcane.) (with JID)	2021	5	3	15	5	6	4	25	6	6	17	RIAA: 4× Platinum; ARIA: 2× Platinum; BPI: Platinum; BVMI: Platinum; FIMI: 2× Platinum; MC: 5× Platinum; RMNZ: 3× Platinum; SNEP: Diamond	Mercury – Act 1
"Bones"	2022	47	6	43	48	24	48	39	— (Note: "Bones" did not enter the NZ Top 40 Singles Chart, but peaked at number six on the NZ Hot Singles Chart.)	11	51	RIAA: 2× Platinum; ARIA: Gold; BPI: Platinum; BVMI: Gold; FIMI: 2× Platinum; MC: 3× Platinum; RMNZ: 2× Platinum; SNEP: Diamond	Mercury – Acts 1 & 2
"Sharks"	2022	— (Note: "Sharks" did not enter the Billboard Hot 100, but peaked at number 24 on the Bubbling Under Hot 100 chart, which acts as a quasi-extension to the Hot 100.)	12	—	92	33	—	86	— (Note: "Sharks" did not enter the NZ Top 40 Singles Chart, but peaked at number 20 on the NZ Hot Singles Chart.)	44	—	RIAA: Gold; FIMI: Gold; MC: Gold; RMNZ: Gold; SNEP: Diamond	Mercury – Acts 1 & 2
"I Don't Like Myself"	2022	—	48	—	—	—	—	—	— (Note: "I Don't Like Myself" did not enter the NZ Top 40 Singles Chart, but peaked at number 27 on the NZ Hot Singles Chart.)	—	—		Mercury – Acts 1 & 2
"Symphony"	2022	—	—	—	—	41	—	—	—	—	—	SNEP: Platinum	Mercury – Acts 1 & 2
"Crushed"	2023	—	—	—	—	—	—	—	—	—	—		Mercury – Acts 1 & 2
"Children of the Sky"	2023	—	41	—	—	51	—	—	— (Note: "Children of the Sky" did not enter the NZ Top 40 Singles Chart, but peaked at number 33 on the NZ Hot Singles Chart.)	—	—	SNEP: Gold	Starfield
"Eyes Closed" (original or with J Balvin)	2024	— (Note: "Eyes Closed" did not enter the Billboard Hot 100, but peaked at number two on the Bubbling Under Hot 100 chart, which acts as a quasi-extension to the Hot 100.)	13	—	89	58	—	—	— (Note: "Eyes Closed" did not enter the NZ Top 40 Singles Chart, but peaked at number 14 on the NZ Hot Singles Chart.)	45	78	MC: Gold; SNEP: Gold	Loom
"Nice to Meet You"	2024	—	33	—	—	170	—	—	— (Note: "Nice to Meet You" did not enter the NZ Top 40 Singles Chart, but peaked at number 14 on the NZ Hot Singles Chart.)	98	—		Loom
"Wake Up"	2024	—	27	—	—	—	—	—	— (Note: "Wake Up" did not enter the NZ Top 40 Singles Chart, but peaked at number 12 on the NZ Hot Singles Chart.)	78	—		Loom
"Stars Will Align" (with Kygo)	2024	—	—	—	—	—	—	—	— (Note: "Stars Will Align" did not enter the NZ Top 40 Singles Chart, but peaked at number five on the NZ Hot Singles Chart.)	51	69		Non-album single
"Take Me to the Beach" (featuring Baker Boy, Ernia, Jungeli, or Ado)	2024	—	27	—	—	—	—	89	— (Note: "Take Me to the Beach" did not enter the NZ Top 40 Singles Chart, but peaked at number 17 on the NZ Hot Singles Chart.)	—	—	SNEP: Gold	Loom
"Dare U" (with NLE Choppa)	2025	—	—	—	—	—	—	—	— (Note: "Dare U" did not enter the NZ Top 40 Singles Chart, but peaked at number 22 on the NZ Hot Singles Chart.)	—	—		Non-album single
"—" denotes a recording that did not chart or was not released in that territory.

=== Promotional singles ===
List of promotional singles, with selected chart positions, showing year released and album name
Title	Year	Peak chart positions										Certifications	Album
Title	Year	US Bub.	US Rock	BEL (FL)	CAN	CAN Rock	FRA	GER	NZ Heat.	POR	SWI	Certifications	Album
"Amsterdam"	2012	—	48	— (Note: "Amsterdam" did not enter the Flanders Ultratop 50, but peaked at number 18 on the Ultratip chart.)	—	45	—	—	—	—	—	RIAA: Platinum	Night Visions
"Round and Round"	2012	—	41	—	—	—	—	—	—	—	—	RIAA: Gold	Continued Silence
"Smoke and Mirrors"	2015	—	32	—	—	—	—	—	—	—	—		Smoke + Mirrors
"I'm So Sorry"	2015	—	14	—	—	—	—	—	—	—	—	RIAA: Platinum; BPI: Silver	Smoke + Mirrors
"Walking the Wire"	2017	5	6	—	— (Note: "Walking the Wire" did not enter the Billboard Canadian Hot 100, but peaked at number 48 on the Canadian Digital Song Sales chart.)	—	125	97	8	84	80	RIAA: Gold; BPI: Silver; RMNZ: Gold	Evolve
"Love of Mine"	2022	—	—	—	—	—	—	—	—	—	—		Night Visions Expanded Edition
"Waves"	2023	—	—	—	—	—	32	—	—	—	—	SNEP: Platinum	Mercury – Acts 1 & 2
"Monica"	2025	—	—	—	—	—	—	—	—	—	—		Reflections (from the Vault of Smoke + Mirrors)
"—" denotes a recording that did not chart or was not released in that territory.

== Other charted and certified songs ==
List of songs, with selected chart positions, showing year released and album name
Title	Year	Peak chart positions										Certifications	Album
Title	Year	US	US Rock	AUT	CAN	FRA	NZ	SVK	SWE	SWI	UK	Certifications	Album
"Tiptoe"	2012	— (Note: "Tiptoe" did not enter the Billboard Hot 100, but peaked at number 13 on the Bubbling Under Hot 100 Singles chart, which acts as a quasi-extension to the Hot 100.)	34	—	—	—	—	—	—	—	182	RIAA: Platinum	Night Visions
"Bleeding Out"	2012	—	30	—	—	—	35	—	—	—	161	RIAA: Platinum; BPI: Silver; RMNZ: Gold	Night Visions
"Who We Are" (Note: "Who We Are" also features on the soundtrack of the 2013 film, The Hunger Games: Catching Fire.)	2013	—	22	—	89	—	—	—	—	—	194	RIAA: Gold	Smoke + Mirrors
"Polaroid"	2015	—	22	—	—	—	—	—	—	—	—	RIAA: Gold	Smoke + Mirrors
"Dream"	2015	—	25	—	—	—	—	—	—	—	—	RIAA: Gold	Smoke + Mirrors
"It Comes Back to You"	2015	—	41	—	—	—	—	—	—	—	—		Smoke + Mirrors
"Friction"	2015	—	44	—	—	—	—	—	—	—	—	RIAA: Gold	Smoke + Mirrors
"The Fall"	2015	—	47	—	—	—	—	—	—	—	—		Smoke + Mirrors
"Thief"	2015	—	— (Note: "Thief" did not enter the Hot Rock Songs chart, but peaked at number 41 on the Rock Digital Song Sales chart.)	—	—	—	—	—	—	—	—		Smoke + Mirrors
"I Don't Know Why"	2017	—	12	71	96	62	— (Note: "I Don't Know Why" did not enter the NZ Top 40 Singles Chart, but peaked at number four on the NZ Heatseeker Singles Chart.)	—	96	—	—	RIAA: Gold	Evolve
"Rise Up"	2017	—	16	—	—	—	—	—	—	—	—	RIAA: Gold; RMNZ: Gold	Evolve
"I'll Make It Up to You"	2017	—	17	—	—	—	— (Note: "I'll Make It Up to You" did not enter the NZ Top 40 Singles Chart, but peaked at number five on the NZ Heatseeker Singles Chart.)	—	—	—	—		Evolve
"Start Over"	2017	—	19	—	—	—	—	—	—	—	—		Evolve
"Mouth of the River"	2017	—	30	—	—	—	—	—	—	—	—		Evolve
"Yesterday"	2017	—	31	—	—	—	—	—	—	—	—		Evolve
"Dancing in the Dark"	2017	—	36	—	—	—	—	—	—	—	—		Evolve
"Thunder / Young Dumb & Broke" (medley with Khalid)	2017	69	4	—	— (Note: "Thunder / Young Dumb & Broke" did not enter the Billboard Canadian Hot 100, but peaked at number 23 on the Canadian Digital Song Sales chart.)	—	—	—	—	—	—		Non-album single
"Boomerang"	2018	—	27	—	—	—	— (Note: "Boomerang" did not enter the NZ Top 40 Singles Chart, but peaked at number 22 on the NZ Hot Singles Chart.)	33	—	70	—		Origins
"Cool Out"	2018	—	38	—	—	—	— (Note: "Cool Out" did not enter the NZ Top 40 Singles Chart, but peaked at number 26 on the NZ Hot Singles Chart.)	50	—	—	—		Origins
"West Coast"	2018	—	28	—	—	—	— (Note: "West Coast" did not enter the NZ Top 40 Singles Chart, but peaked at number 27 on the NZ Hot Singles Chart.)	32	—	—	—		Origins
"Bullet in a Gun"	2018	—	41	—	—	—	—	45	—	—	—		Origins
"Digital"	2018	—	—	—	—	—	—	71	—	—	—		Origins
"Only"	2018	—	45	—	—	—	—	66	—	—	—		Origins
"Stuck"	2018	—	48	—	—	—	—	77	—	—	—		Origins
"Love"	2018	—	—	—	—	—	—	78	—	—	—		Origins
"Heart Upon My Sleeve" (with Avicii)	2019	—	—	—	— (Note: "Heart Upon My Sleeve" did not enter the Billboard Canadian Hot 100, but peaked at number 28 on the Canadian Digital Song Sales chart.)	—	—	—	11	44	—		Tim
"My Life"	2021	—	29	—	—	—	— (Note: "My Life" did not enter the NZ Top 40 Singles Chart, but peaked at number 33 on the NZ Hot Singles Chart.)	—	—	—	—		Mercury – Act 1
"Lonely"	2021	—	34	—	—	—	— (Note: "Lonely" did not enter the NZ Top 40 Singles Chart, but peaked at number 39 on the NZ Hot Singles Chart.)	—	—	—	—		Mercury – Act 1
"No Time for Toxic People"	2021	—	39	—	—	—	—	—	—	—	—		Mercury – Act 1
"—" denotes a recording that did not chart or was not released in that territory.

== Guest appearances ==
List of non-single guest appearances, showing year released and album name
Title	Year	Album
"Lost Cause"	2012	Frankenweenie: Unleashed!
"Ready Aim Fire"	2013	Iron Man 3: Heroes Fall – Music Inspired by the Motion Picture
"Who We Are"	2013	The Hunger Games: Catching Fire
"30 Lives" (Original Demo Version)	2013	Songs for the Philippines
"Fear" (X Ambassadors featuring Imagine Dragons)	2015	VHS
"Heart Upon My Sleeve" (with Avicii)	2019	Tim

== Music videos ==
List of music videos, showing year released and director
Title	Year	Director(s)	Album
"Uptight"	2009	Luke Andrews	Imagine Dragons
"America"	2010	Unknown	It's Time
"The River"	2010	Unknown	It's Time
"Amsterdam"	2010	Unknown	It's Time
"Look How Far We've Come"	2011	Unknown	It's Time
"Tokyo"	2011	Unknown	It's Time
"Pantomime"	2011	Unknown	It's Time
"It's Time"	2012	Anthony Leonardi	Night Visions
"It's Time" (JailBreaks Remix)	2012	Guy Logan	Night Visions
"Radioactive"	2012	Syndrome	Night Visions
"Demons"	2013	Isaac Halasima	Night Visions
"On Top of the World"	2013	Corey Fox, Matt Eastin	Night Visions
"Monster"	2013	Infinity Blade 3	Smoke + Mirrors
"Battle Cry"	2014	Transformers: Age of Extinction	Smoke + Mirrors
"Warriors"	2014	Riot Games and Fortiche Production	Smoke + Mirrors
"I Bet My Life"	2014	Jodeb	Smoke + Mirrors
"Gold"	2015	Isaac Halasima	Smoke + Mirrors
"Shots"	2015	Robert Hales	Smoke + Mirrors
"Shots" (Broiler Remix)	2015	Matt Eastin	Smoke + Mirrors
"Shots" (Broiler Remix) [Alternate Music Video]	2015	Matt Eastin	Smoke + Mirrors
"Roots"	2015	Matt Eastin	Smoke + Mirrors
"Sucker for Pain" (with Lil Wayne, Wiz Khalifa, Logic, and Ty Dolla Sign featuring X Ambassadors)	2016	David Ayer	Suicide Squad: The Album
"Believer"	2017	Matt Eastin	Evolve
"Thunder"	2017	Joseph Kahn	Evolve
"Whatever It Takes"	2017	Matt Eastin, Aaron Hymes	Evolve
"Walking the Wire"	2017	gagaputa	Evolve
"Next to Me"	2018	Mark Pellington	Evolve
"Born to Be Yours" (with Kygo)	2018	Matt Eastin, Aaron Hymes	Origins
"Natural"	2018	Joseph Kahn	Origins
"Zero"	2018	Dave Meyers	Origins
"Bad Liar"	2019	Ryan Reichenfeld	Origins
"Birds"	2019	Zac Wong	Origins
"Nothing Left to Say"	2020	Patrick Foch	Night Visions
"Follow You"	2021	Matt Eastin	Mercury – Acts 1 & 2
"Cutthroat"	2021	Matt Eastin	Mercury – Acts 1 & 2
"Follow You" (Summer '21 Version)	2021	Unknown	Mercury – Acts 1 & 2
"Wrecked"	2021	Matt Eastin	Mercury – Acts 1 & 2
"Monday"	2021	Matt Eastin	Mercury – Acts 1 & 2
"Enemy" (with JID)	2021	Riot Games and Fortiche Production	Mercury – Acts 1 & 2
"Bones"	2022	Jason Koenig	Mercury – Acts 1 & 2
"Sharks"	2022	Drew Kirsch	Mercury – Acts 1 & 2
"I Don't Like Myself"	2022	Matt Eastin	Mercury – Acts 1 & 2
"Symphony" (Inner City Youth Orchestra of Los Angeles Version)	2022	Matt Eastin	Mercury – Acts 1 & 2
"Crushed"	2023	Ty Arnold	Mercury – Acts 1 & 2
"Children of the Sky"	2023	FILFURYEP	Starfield
"Eyes Closed"	2024	Andrew Donoho	Loom
"Eyes Closed" (with J Balvin)	2024	Matt Eastin	Loom
"Nice to Meet You"	2024	Matt Eastin	Loom
"Wake Up"	2024	Matt Eastin	Loom
"Stars Will Align" (with Kygo)	2024	Rafatoon	Non-album single
