= List of songs recorded by Imagine Dragons =

This is a comprehensive list of every song recorded by the American pop rock band Imagine Dragons. This includes singles, covers, soundtrack songs, collaborations, and unreleased songs.

== List of songs ==
Key
†	Indicates single release

Name of song, featured performers, writers, originating album, and year released.
Song	Artist(s)	Writer(s)	Release(s)	Year
"#1"	Imagine Dragons	Dan Reynolds; Wayne Sermon; Ben McKee; Daniel Platzman; Kaelyn Behr; Mark Benedicto	Mercury – Act 1	2021
"30 Lives"	Imagine Dragons	Dan Reynolds; Wayne Sermon; Ben McKee	iTunes Session, Songs for the Philippines	2013
"A-Ok"	Imagine Dragons		Reflections	2025
"All Eyes"	Imagine Dragons	Dan Reynolds; Wayne Sermon; Ben McKee	Hell and Silence EP	2010
"All For You"	Imagine Dragons	Dan Reynolds; Wayne Sermon; Ben McKee; Daniel Platzman	Transformers: Age of Extinction – The Score	2014
"America"	Imagine Dragons	Dan Reynolds; Wayne Sermon; Ben McKee	It's Time EP, Night Visions (Deluxe Edition), The Archive EP	2010
"Amsterdam"	Imagine Dragons	Dan Reynolds; Wayne Sermon; Ben McKee	It's Time EP, Night Visions	2010
"Bad Liar" †	Imagine Dragons	Dan Reynolds; Wayne Sermon; Ben McKee; Daniel Platzman; Aja Volkman; Jorgen Odegard	Origins	2018
"Battle Cry" †	Imagine Dragons	Dan Reynolds; Wayne Sermon; Ben McKee; Daniel Platzman	Smoke + Mirrors (Super Deluxe Edition)	2014
"Believer" †	Imagine Dragons	Dan Reynolds; Wayne Sermon; Ben McKee; Daniel Platzman; Robin Fredriksson; Mattias Larsson; Justin Tranter	Evolve	2017
"Believer" (remix)	Imagine Dragons featuring Lil Wayne	Dan Reynolds; Wayne Sermon; Ben McKee; Daniel Platzman; Robin Fredriksson; Mattias Larsson; Justin Tranter; Dwayne Carter Jr	Non-album single	2019
"Birds"	Imagine Dragons	Dan Reynolds; Wayne Sermon; Ben McKee; Daniel Platzman; Joel Little	Origins (Deluxe Edition)	2018
"Birds" (remixed single version) †	Imagine Dragons featuring Elisa	Dan Reynolds; Wayne Sermon; Ben McKee; Daniel Platzman; Joel Little	Non-album single	2019
"Black"	Imagine Dragons		Reflections	2025
"Blank Space / Stand By Me" (live cover medley)	Imagine Dragons	Taylor Swift; Ben E. King; Jerry Leiber; Mike Stoller	Imagine Dragons (Spotify Sessions)	2015
"Bleeding Out"	Imagine Dragons	Dan Reynolds; Wayne Sermon; Ben McKee; Alexander Grant; Josh Mosser	Night Visions	2012
"Blur"	Imagine Dragons	Dan Reynolds; Wayne Sermon; Ben McKee; Daniel Platzman; Graham Andrew Muron; Nick Scapa; Mick Coogan	Mercury – Act 2	2022
"Bones" †	Imagine Dragons	Dan Reynolds; Wayne Sermon; Ben McKee; Daniel Platzman; Robin Fredriksson; Mattias Larsson	Mercury – Act 2	2022
"Boomerang"	Imagine Dragons	Dan Reynolds; Wayne Sermon; Ben McKee; Daniel Platzman; Jorgen Odegard	Origins	2018
"Boots"	Imagine Dragons	Dan Reynolds	Speak to Me EP	2008
"Born to Be Yours" †	Kygo and Imagine Dragons	Kyrre Gørvell-Dahll; Dan Reynolds; Wayne Sermon; Ben McKee; Daniel Platzman	Origins (International Deluxe Edition)	2018
"Bubble"	Imagine Dragons		Night Visions (Expanded Edition)	2022
"Bullet in a Gun"	Imagine Dragons	Dan Reynolds; Wayne Sermon; Ben McKee; Daniel Platzman; Alexander Grant; Jayson DeZuzio	Origins	2018
"Burn Out"	Imagine Dragons	Dan Reynolds; Wayne Sermon; Ben McKee; Daniel Platzman	Origins (Deluxe Edition)	2018
"Cha-Ching (Till We Grow Older)"	Imagine Dragons	Dan Reynolds; Wayne Sermon; Ben McKee; Clint Holgate	Night Visions (Deluxe Edition)	2012
"Children of the Sky (a Starfield song)" †	Imagine Dragons	Dan Reynolds; Wayne Sermon; Ben McKee; Inon Zur; Mattias Larsson; Robin Fredriksson	Non-album single	2023
"Continual"	Imagine Dragons featuring Cory Henry	Dan Reynolds; Wayne Sermon; Ben McKee; Daniel Platzman; Cory Henry	Mercury – Act 2	2022
"Cool Out"	Imagine Dragons	Dan Reynolds; Wayne Sermon; Ben McKee; Daniel Platzman; Tim Randolph	Origins	2018
"Cover Up"	Imagine Dragons	Dan Reynolds; Wayne Sermon; Ben McKee	Imagine Dragons EP, Night Visions (Deluxe Edition)	2009
"Cowboy"	Imagine Dragons		Reflections	2025
"Crushed" †	Imagine Dragons	Dan Reynolds; Wayne Sermon; Ben McKee; Daniel Platzman	Mercury – Act 2	2023
"Curse"	Imagine Dragons	Dan Reynolds; Wayne Sermon; Ben McKee	Imagine Dragons EP	2009
"Cutthroat" †	Imagine Dragons	Dan Reynolds; Wayne Sermon; Ben McKee; Daniel Platzman	Mercury – Act 1	2021
"Dancing in the Dark"	Imagine Dragons	Dan Reynolds; Wayne Sermon; Ben McKee; Daniel Platzman; Alexander Grant	Evolve	2017
"Dare U" †	NLE Choppa and Imagine Dragons	Bryson Potts; Dan Reynolds; Wayne Sermon; Ben McKee	Non-album single	2025
"Demons" †	Imagine Dragons	Dan Reynolds; Wayne Sermon; Ben McKee; Alexander Grant; Josh Mosser	Continued Silence, Night Visions	2013
"Destination"	Imagine Dragons	Dan Reynolds; Wayne Sermon; Ben McKee	ITunes Session	2013
"Destroyed"	Imagine Dragons		Reflections	2025
"Digital"	Imagine Dragons	Dan Reynolds; Wayne Sermon; Ben McKee; Daniel Platzman; Alexander Grant	Origins	2018
"Dolphins"	Imagine Dragons	Dan Reynolds; Wayne Sermon; Ben McKee; Brittany Tolman; Andrew Tolman	It's Time EP	2021
"Don't Forget Me"	Imagine Dragons	Dan Reynolds; Wayne Sermon; Ben McKee; Robin Fredriksson; Mattias Larsson	Loom	2024
"Dream"	Imagine Dragons	Dan Reynolds; Wayne Sermon; Ben McKee; Daniel Platzman; Alexander Grant	Smoke + Mirrors	2015
"Drive"	Imagine Dragons	Dan Reynolds; Wayne Sermon; Ben McKee	Imagine Dragons EP	2009
"Dull Knives"	Imagine Dragons	Dan Reynolds; Wayne Sermon; Ben McKee; Daniel Platzman; Aja Volkman	Mercury – Act 1	2021
"Easy"	Imagine Dragons	Dan Reynolds; Wayne Sermon; Ben McKee	Hell and Silence EP	2021
"Easy Come Easy Go"	Imagine Dragons	Dan Reynolds; Wayne Sermon; Ben McKee; Daniel Platzman; Jayson DeZuzio	Mercury – Act 1	2021
"Emma"	Imagine Dragons	Dan Reynolds; Wayne Sermon; Ben McKee	Hell and Silence EP	2010
"Enemy" (single version) †	Imagine Dragons and JID	Dan Reynolds; Wayne Sermon; Ben McKee; Daniel Platzman; Robin Fredriksson; Mattias Larsson; Justin Tranter; Destin Route	Arcane League of Legends, Mercury – Act 1 (Additional Track Version)	2021
"Enemy" (solo mix)	Imagine Dragons	Dan Reynolds; Wayne Sermon; Ben McKee; Daniel Platzman; Robin Fredriksson; Mattias Larsson; Justin Tranter	Non-album single	2021
"Enemy" (Opening Title version) †	Imagine Dragons and JID	Dan Reynolds; Wayne Sermon; Ben McKee; Daniel Platzman; Robin Fredriksson; Mattias Larsson; Justin Tranter; Destin Route	Arcane League of Legends: Season 2	2024
"Every Night"	Imagine Dragons	Dan Reynolds; Wayne Sermon; Ben McKee	Night Visions	2012
"Eyes Closed"†	Imagine Dragons	Dan Reynolds; Wayne Sermon; Ben McKee	Loom	2024
"Eyes Closed" (remixed version) †	Imagine Dragons with J Balvin	Dan Reynolds; Wayne Sermon; Ben McKee; J Balvin	Loom (Deluxe Edition)	2024
"The Fall"	Imagine Dragons	Dan Reynolds; Wayne Sermon; Ben McKee; Daniel Platzman	Smoke + Mirrors	2015
"Fallen"	Imagine Dragons	Dan Reynolds; Wayne Sermon; Ben McKee	Night Visions (Deluxe Edition)	2012
"Fear"	X Ambassadors featuring Imagine Dragons	Sam Harris; Casey Harris; Adam Levin; Noah Feldshuh; Dan Reynolds; Alexander Grant	VHS	2015
"Ferris Wheel"	Imagine Dragons	Dan Reynolds; Wayne Sermon; Ben McKee; Daniel Platzman	Mercury – Act 2	2022
"Fire in These Hills"	Imagine Dragons	Dan Reynolds; Wayne Sermon; Ben McKee; Robin Fredriksson; Mattias Larsson	Loom	2024
"Follow You" †	Imagine Dragons	Dan Reynolds; Wayne Sermon; Ben McKee; Daniel Platzman; Joel Little; Elley Duhé; Fransisca Hall	Mercury – Act 1	2021
"Follow You" (Summer '21 version)	Imagine Dragons	Dan Reynolds; Wayne Sermon; Ben McKee; Daniel Platzman; Joel Little; Elley Duhé; Fransisca Hall	Mercury – Act 1 (Japanese Edition)	2021
"Forever Young" (live cover)	Imagine Dragons	Marian Gold; Bernhard Lloyd; Frank Mertens	Smoke + Mirrors Live	2016
"Friction"	Imagine Dragons	Dan Reynolds; Wayne Sermon; Ben McKee; Daniel Platzman	Smoke + Mirrors	2015
"The Ghost Intervention"	Imagine Dragons		Reflections	2025
"Giants"	Imagine Dragons	Dan Reynolds; Wayne Sermon; Ben McKee; Daniel Platzman; Andrew Tolman	Mercury – Act 1	2021
"Gods Don't Pray"	Imagine Dragons	Dan Reynolds; Wayne Sermon; Ben McKee; Robin Fredriksson; Mattias Larsson	Loom	2024
"Gold" †	Imagine Dragons	Dan Reynolds; Wayne Sermon; Ben McKee; Daniel Platzman; Alexander Grant	Smoke + Mirrors	2014
"Hand In My Pocket" (live cover)	Imagine Dragons	Alanis Morissette; Glen Ballard	Live at AllSaints Studios	2017
"Hands" †	Various artists	Justin Tranter; Julia Michaels; Michael Tucker	Non-album single	2016
"Hear Me" †	Imagine Dragons	Dan Reynolds; Wayne Sermon; Ben McKee	Hell and Silence EP, Hear Me EP, Night Visions	2010
"Heart Upon My Sleeve"	Avicii and Imagine Dragons	Tim Bergling; Arash Pournouri; Dan Reynolds; Wayne Sermon; Ben McKee; Daniel Platzman	TIM	2019
"Higher Ground"	Imagine Dragons	Dan Reynolds; Wayne Sermon; Ben McKee; Daniel Platzman; Andrew Tolman	Mercury – Act 2	2022
"Hole Inside Our Chests"	Imagine Dragons	Dan Reynolds; Wayne Sermon; Ben McKee; Brittany Tolman; Andrew Tolman	Imagine Dragons EP	2021
"Hopeless Opus"	Imagine Dragons	Dan Reynolds; Wayne Sermon; Ben McKee; Daniel Platzman	Smoke + Mirrors	2015
"I Bet My Life" †	Imagine Dragons	Dan Reynolds; Wayne Sermon; Ben McKee; Daniel Platzman	Smoke + Mirrors	2014
"I Don't Know Why"	Imagine Dragons	Dan Reynolds; Wayne Sermon; Ben McKee; Daniel Platzman; Robin Fredriksson; Mattias Larsson; Justin Tranter	Evolve	2017
"I Don't Like Myself" †	Imagine Dragons	Dan Reynolds; Wayne Sermon; Ben McKee; Daniel Platzman; Marco Borrero	Mercury – Act 2	2022
"I Don't Mind"	Imagine Dragons	Dan Reynolds; Wayne Sermon; Ben McKee	Hell and Silence EP, Night Visions (Deluxe Edition)	2010
"I Get Carried Away"	Imagine Dragons		Reflections	2025
"I Love You All The Time" (cover)	Imagine Dragons	Jesse Hughes; Josh Homme; Mark Ramos Nishita	Non-album single	2015
"I Need a Minute"	Imagine Dragons	Dan Reynolds; Wayne Sermon; Ben McKee	Imagine Dragons EP	2009
"I Was Me" †	Imagine Dragons	Dan Reynolds	Non-album single	2015
"I Wish"	Imagine Dragons	Dan Reynolds; Wayne Sermon; Ben McKee; Daniel Platzman	Mercury – Act 2	2022
"I'll Make It Up to You"	Imagine Dragons	Dan Reynolds; Wayne Sermon; Ben McKee; Daniel Platzman; Tim Randolph	Evolve	2017
"I'm Happy"	Imagine Dragons	Dan Reynolds; Wayne Sermon; Ben McKee; Daniel Platzman; Andrew Tolman	Mercury – Act 2	2022
"I'm So Sorry"	Imagine Dragons	Dan Reynolds; Wayne Sermon; Ben McKee; Daniel Platzman	Smoke + Mirrors	2015
"Imagine Dragons"	Ragged Insomnia	Dan Reynolds; Wayne Sermon; Ben McKee; Daniel Platzman	Non-album single	2021
"In Your Corner"	Imagine Dragons	Dan Reynolds; Wayne Sermon; Ben McKee; Robin Fredriksson; Mattias Larsson	Loom	2024
"It Comes Back To You"	Imagine Dragons	Dan Reynolds; Wayne Sermon; Ben McKee; Daniel Platzman	Smoke + Mirrors	2015
"It's Ok"	Imagine Dragons	Dan Reynolds; Wayne Sermon; Ben McKee; Daniel Platzman; Andrew Tolman	Mercury – Act 1	2021
"It's Time" †	Imagine Dragons	Dan Reynolds; Wayne Sermon; Ben McKee	It's Time EP, Continued Silence, Night Visions	2010
"The Journey"	Imagine Dragons		Reflections	2025
"Kid"	Imagine Dragons	Dan Reynolds; Wayne Sermon; Ben McKee; Robin Fredriksson; Mattias Larsson	Loom	2024
"Leave Me"	Imagine Dragons	Dan Reynolds; Wayne Sermon; Ben McKee	It's Time EP	2010
"Levitate" †	Imagine Dragons	Dan Reynolds; Wayne Sermon; Ben McKee; Daniel Platzman; Tim Randolph	Passengers soundtrack, Evolve (Deluxe Edition)	2016
"Living Musical"	Imagine Dragons	Dan Reynolds	Speak to Me EP	2008
"Lonely"	Imagine Dragons	Dan Reynolds; Wayne Sermon; Ben McKee; Daniel Platzman; Robin Fredriksson; Mattias Larsson; Justin Tranter	Mercury – Act 1	2021
"Look How Far We've Come"	Imagine Dragons	Dan Reynolds; Wayne Sermon; Ben McKee	It's Time EP	2011
"Lost Cause"	Imagine Dragons	Dan Reynolds; Alexander Grant; Josh Mosser	Frankenweenie Unleashed!: Music Inspired by the Motion Picture	2012
"Love"	Imagine Dragons	Dan Reynolds; Wayne Sermon; Ben McKee; Ido Zmishlany	Origins	2018
"Love of Mine"	Imagine Dragons	Dan Reynolds; Wayne Sermon	Night Visions (Expanded Edition)	2022
"Machine" †	Imagine Dragons	Dan Reynolds; Wayne Sermon; Ben McKee; Daniel Platzman; Alexander Grant	Origins	2018
"Mayday"	Imagine Dragons		Reflections	2025
"Monday" †	Imagine Dragons	Dan Reynolds; Wayne Sermon; Ben McKee; Daniel Platzman; Andrew Tolman	Mercury – Act 1	2021
"Monica"	Imagine Dragons		Reflections	2025
"Monster" †	Imagine Dragons	Dan Reynolds; Wayne Sermon; Alexander Grant; Josh Mosser	Infinity Blade III Original Soundtrack, Smoke + Mirrors (Super Deluxe Edition)	2013
"Mouth of the River"	Imagine Dragons	Dan Reynolds; Wayne Sermon; Ben McKee; Daniel Platzman; Tim Randolph	Evolve	2017
"My Car"	Imagine Dragons		Reflections	2025
"My Fault"	Imagine Dragons	Dan Reynolds; Wayne Sermon; Ben McKee; Alexander Grant	Continued Silence, Night Visions (Deluxe Edition), The Archive EP	2012
"My Life"	Imagine Dragons	Dan Reynolds; Wayne Sermon; Ben McKee; Daniel Platzman; Robin Fredriksson; Mattias Larsson; Justin Tranter	Mercury – Act 1	2021
"Natural" †	Imagine Dragons	Dan Reynolds; Wayne Sermon; Ben McKee; Daniel Platzman; Robin Fredriksson; Mattias Larsson; Justin Tranter	Origins	2018
"Next to Me" †	Imagine Dragons	Dan Reynolds; Wayne Sermon; Ben McKee; Daniel Platzman; Alexander Grant	Evolve (Digital Re-release)	2018
"Nice to Meet You"†	Imagine Dragons	Dan Reynolds; Wayne Sermon; Ben McKee; Robin Fredriksson; Mattias Larsson	Loom	2024
"No Time For Toxic People"	Imagine Dragons	Dan Reynolds; Wayne Sermon; Ben McKee; Daniel Platzman; Jason Suwito	Mercury – Act 1	2021
"Not Today"†	Imagine Dragons	Dan Reynolds; Wayne Sermon; Ben McKee; Daniel Platzman; Michael Daly	Me Before You Original Soundtrack, Evolve (Deluxe Edition)	2016
"Nothing Left To Say / Rocks"	Imagine Dragons	Dan Reynolds; Wayne Sermon; Ben McKee	Night Visions	2012
"One Day"	Imagine Dragons	Dan Reynolds; Wayne Sermon; Ben McKee; Daniel Platzman; Jesse Shatkin; Dylan Wiggins	Mercury – Act 1	2021
"On Top of the World" †	Imagine Dragons	Dan Reynolds; Wayne Sermon; Ben McKee; Alexander Grant	Continued Silence, Night Visions	2013
"Only"	Imagine Dragons	Dan Reynolds; Wayne Sermon; Ben McKee; Daniel Platzman; Robin Fredriksson; Mattias Larsson; Justin Tranter	Origins	2018
"Pantomime"	Imagine Dragons	Dan Reynolds; Wayne Sermon; Ben McKee	It's Time EP	2011
"Peace of Mind"	Imagine Dragons	Dan Reynolds; Wayne Sermon; Ben McKee; Daniel Platzman; Jason Suwito	Mercury – Act 2	2022
"Pistol Whip"	Imagine Dragons	Dan Reynolds	Speak to Me EP	2008
"Playin' Me"	Imagine Dragons		Reflections	2025
"The Pit"	Imagine Dragons	Dan Reynolds	Speak to Me EP	2008
"Polaroid"	Imagine Dragons	Dan Reynolds; Wayne Sermon; Ben McKee; Daniel Platzman	Smoke + Mirrors	2015
"Radioactive" †	Imagine Dragons	Dan Reynolds; Wayne Sermon; Ben McKee; Alexander Grant; Josh Mosser	Continued Silence, Night Visions, Hear Me EP	2012
"Radioactive" (remix) †	Imagine Dragons featuring Kendrick Lamar	Dan Reynolds; Wayne Sermon; Ben McKee; Alexander Grant; Josh Mosser; Kendrick Lamar	Non-album promotional single	2014
"Ready Aim Fire"	Imagine Dragons	Dan Reynolds; Alexander Grant; Josh Mosser	Iron Man 3: Heroes Fall	2013
"Real Life"	Imagine Dragons	Dan Reynolds; Wayne Sermon; Ben McKee; Daniel Platzman; Tim Randolph	Origins (Deluxe Edition)	2018
"Release"	Imagine Dragons	Dan Reynolds; Wayne Sermon; Ben McKee; Daniel Platzman	Smoke + Mirrors (Deluxe Edition)	2015
"Rise Up"	Imagine Dragons	Dan Reynolds; Wayne Sermon; Ben McKee; Daniel Platzman; John Hill	Evolve	2017
"The River"	Imagine Dragons	Dan Reynolds; Wayne Sermon; Ben McKee	It's Time EP, Night Visions (Deluxe Edition), Hear Me EP, The Archive EP	2011
"Roots" †	Imagine Dragons	Dan Reynolds; Wayne Sermon; Ben McKee; Daniel Platzman; Alexander Grant	Evolve (Japanese Edition)	2015
"Round and Round"	Imagine Dragons	Dan Reynolds; Wayne Sermon; Ben McKee; Alexander Grant	Continued Silence, Night Visions (Deluxe Edition), The Archive EP	2012
"Second Chances"	Imagine Dragons	Dan Reynolds; Wayne Sermon; Ben McKee; Daniel Platzman	Smoke + Mirrors (Deluxe Edition)	2015
"Selene"	Imagine Dragons	Dan Reynolds; Wayne Sermon; Ben McKee	Hell and Silence EP, Night Visions (Deluxe Edition)	2010
"Sharks" †	Imagine Dragons	Dan Reynolds; Wayne Sermon; Ben McKee; Daniel Platzman; Robin Fredriksson; Mattias Larsson	Mercury – Act 2	2022
"Shots" †	Imagine Dragons	Dan Reynolds; Wayne Sermon; Ben McKee; Daniel Platzman	Smoke + Mirrors	2015
"Sirens"	Imagine Dragons	Dan Reynolds; Wayne Sermon; Ben McKee; Daniel Platzman; Jayson DeZuzio	Mercury – Act 2	2022
"Smoke and Mirrors"	Imagine Dragons	Dan Reynolds; Wayne Sermon; Ben McKee; Daniel Platzman	Smoke + Mirrors	2015
"Speak to Me"	Imagine Dragons	Dan Reynolds	Speak to Me EP	2008
"Stars Will Align" †	Kygo and Imagine Dragons	Kyrre Gørvell-Dahll; Dan Reynolds; Wayne Sermon; Ben McKee; Daniel Platzman	Non-album single	2024
"Start Over"	Imagine Dragons	Dan Reynolds; Wayne Sermon; Ben McKee; Daniel Platzman; Robin Fredriksson; Mattias Larsson; Justin Tranter	Evolve	2017
"Strange Ways"	Imagine Dragons		Reflections	2025
"Stuck"	Imagine Dragons	Dan Reynolds; Wayne Sermon; Ben McKee; Daniel Platzman; Alexander Grant; Jayson DeZuzio	Origins	2018
"Sucker for Pain" †	Lil Wayne, Wiz Khalifa, Imagine Dragons with Logic and Ty Dolla Sign featuring X Ambassadors	Dwayne Carter Jr; Cameron Thomaz; Dan Reynolds; Wayne Sermon; Ben McKee; Daniel Platzman; Sir Robert Bryson Hall II; Tyrone Griffin Jr; Sam Harris; Alexander Grant	Suicide Squad: The Album	2016
"Summer"	Imagine Dragons	Dan Reynolds; Wayne Sermon; Ben McKee; Daniel Platzman	Smoke + Mirrors	2015
"Symphony" †	Imagine Dragons	Dan Reynolds; Wayne Sermon; Ben McKee; Daniel Platzman; Joel Little; Talay Riley; Adio Marchant	Mercury – Act 2	2022
"Symphony (Inner City Youth Orchestra of Los Angeles Version)" †	Imagine Dragons Inner City Youth Orchestra of Los Angeles/ Coke Studio	Dan Reynolds; Wayne Sermon; Ben McKee; Daniel Platzman; Joel Little; Talay Riley; Adio Marchant	Coke Studio	2023
"Take It Easy"	Imagine Dragons	Dan Reynolds; Wayne Sermon; Ben McKee; Daniel Platzman	Mercury – Act 2	2022
"Take Me to the Beach"	Imagine Dragons	Dan Reynolds; Wayne Sermon; Ben McKee; Robin Fredriksson; Mattias Larsson	Loom	2024
"Take Me to the Beach" (remix) †	Imagine Dragons featuring Baker Boy or Jungeli or Ernia or Ado	Dan Reynolds; Wayne Sermon; Ben McKee; Robin Fredriksson; Mattias Larsson; Danzal Baker (Baker Boy version); Phillip Norman (Baker Boy version); Robert Amoruso (Baker Boy version); Joel Ungeli (Jungeli version); Kidd (Jungeli version); Tidiane Diongue (Jungeli version); Matteo Professione (Ernia version)	Non-album promotional single	2024
"They Don't Know You Like I Do"	Imagine Dragons	Dan Reynolds; Wayne Sermon; Ben McKee; Daniel Platzman; Andrew Tolman	Mercury – Act 2	2022
"Thief"	Imagine Dragons	Dan Reynolds; Wayne Sermon; Ben McKee; Daniel Platzman	Smoke + Mirrors (Deluxe Edition)	2015
"Thunder" †	Imagine Dragons	Dan Reynolds; Wayne Sermon; Ben McKee; Daniel Platzman; Alexander Grant; Jayson DeZuzio	Evolve	2017
"Thunder" (official remix)	Imagine Dragons and K.Flay	Dan Reynolds; Wayne Sermon; Ben McKee; Daniel Platzman; Alexander Grant; Jayson DeZuzio; Kristine Flaherty	Non-album promotional single	2017
"Thunder/Young Dumb & Broke (Medley)"	Imagine Dragons and Khalid	Dan Reynolds; Wayne Sermon; Ben McKee; Daniel Platzman; Alexander Grant; Jayson DeZuzio; Khalid Robinson; Joel Little; Talay Riley	Non-album promotional single	2017
"Tied"	Imagine Dragons	Dan Reynolds; Wayne Sermon; Ben McKee; Daniel Platzman	Mercury – Act 2	2022
"Tiptoe"	Imagine Dragons	Dan Reynolds; Wayne Sermon; Ben McKee	Night Visions	2012
"Tokyo"	Imagine Dragons	Dan Reynolds; Wayne Sermon; Ben McKee	It's Time EP, Night Visions (Expanded Edition)	2011
"Trouble"	Imagine Dragons	Dan Reynolds; Wayne Sermon; Ben McKee; Daniel Platzman	Smoke + Mirrors	2015
"Underdog"	Imagine Dragons	Dan Reynolds; Wayne Sermon; Ben McKee	Night Visions	2012
"The Unknown"	Imagine Dragons	Dan Reynolds; Wayne Sermon; Ben McKee; Daniel Platzman	Smoke + Mirrors (Deluxe Edition)	2015
"Uptight"	Imagine Dragons	Dan Reynolds; Wayne Sermon; Ben McKee	Imagine Dragons EP	2009
"Wake Up" †	Imagine Dragons	Dan Reynolds; Wayne Sermon; Ben McKee; Robin Fredriksson; Mattias Larsson	Loom	2024
"Walking the Wire"	Imagine Dragons	Dan Reynolds; Wayne Sermon; Ben McKee; Daniel Platzman; Robin Fredriksson; Mattias Larsson; Justin Tranter	Evolve	2017
"Warriors" †	Imagine Dragons	Dan Reynolds; Wayne Sermon; Ben McKee; Daniel Platzman; Alexander Grant; Josh Mosser	Smoke + Mirrors (International Deluxe Edition)	2014
"Waves"	Imagine Dragons	Dan Reynolds; Wayne Sermon; Ben McKee; Daniel Platzman; Robin Fredriksson; Mattias Larsson; Justin Tranter	Mercury – Act 2	2022
"West Coast"	Imagine Dragons	Dan Reynolds; Wayne Sermon; Ben McKee; Daniel Platzman	Origins	2018
"Whatever It Takes" †	Imagine Dragons	Dan Reynolds; Wayne Sermon; Ben McKee; Daniel Platzman; Joel Little	Evolve	2017
"White Christmas" (cover)	Imagine Dragons	Irving Berlin	Non-album single	2016
"Who We Are"	Imagine Dragons	Dan Reynolds; Wayne Sermon; Ben McKee; Alexander Grant; Josh Mosser	The Hunger Games: Catching Fire - Original Motion Picture Soundtrack, Smoke + Mirrors (Super Deluxe Edition)	2013
"Wings"	Imagine Dragons	Dan Reynolds; Wayne Sermon; Ben McKee; Daniel Platzman	NBA 2K17 soundtrack	2016
"Woke"	Imagine Dragons		Reflections	2025
"Working Man"	Imagine Dragons	Dan Reynolds; Wayne Sermon; Ben McKee	Night Visions (Deluxe Edition)	2012
"Wrecked" †	Imagine Dragons	Dan Reynolds; Wayne Sermon; Ben McKee; Daniel Platzman	Mercury – Act 1	2021
"Yesterday"	Imagine Dragons	Dan Reynolds; Wayne Sermon; Ben McKee; Daniel Platzman; Alexander Grant; Jayson DeZuzio	Evolve	2017
"Younger"	Imagine Dragons	Dan Reynolds; Wayne Sermon; Ben McKee; Daniel Platzman; Andrew Tolman	Mercury – Act 2	2022
"Zero" †	Imagine Dragons	Dan Reynolds; Wayne Sermon; Ben McKee; Daniel Platzman; John Hill	Ralph Breaks the Internet (Original Motion Picture Soundtrack), Origins	2018

== Unreleased songs ==
Name of song, writers, and any other notes
Song	Writer(s)	Notes	Ref.
"Adrenaline"	Dan Reynolds; Josh Mosser; Alex Da Kid	Registered by GEMA	
"Amphetamine"	Dan Reynolds; Wayne Sermon; Ben McKee; Daniel Platzman	Registered by GEMA	
"Bad Boys"	Unknown	Appeared on "The Itch"; Name partially visible on a whiteboard in the "Easy Come Easy Go" lyric video	
"Bla Bla Bla"	Unknown	Appeared on "The Itch"; Metadata suggested the song is from 2016	
"Blessed Day"	Dan Reynolds; Wayne Sermon; Ben McKee; Daniel Platzman	Registered by GEMA	
"Believe Her"	Unknown	Official name is Believe Her, also known as Falling Into You" to fans; Featured in a 2010 video of the band working on their It's Time EP	
"Bloom"	Dan Reynolds; Josh Mosser; Alex Da Kid	Registered by GEMA	
"Bombs"	Dan Reynolds; Josh Mosser; Alex Da Kid	Registered by GEMA; Also known as "Admiral"	
"Born Yesterday"	Dan Reynolds; Alexander Grant; Josh Mosser	Registered by the American Society of Composers, Authors and Publishers (ASCAP) and GEMA	
"Bottle of Coke"	Unknown	First appeared on a demo CD from 2008; Re-recorded for Speak to Me EP in 2009, but left off the EP	
"Broken"	Dan Reynolds; Josh Mosser; Alex Da Kid	Registered by GEMA	
"Bygones"	Unknown	The official title is known as Bygones, also known as "I Am Just A Sailor" to fans; Featured in a 2010 video of the band working on their It's Time EP	
"C'est la Vie"	Unknown	Appeared on "The Itch"	
"Can't Stop Loving You"	Dan Reynolds; Wayne Sermon; Ben McKee; Daniel Platzman	Registered by GEMA	
"Clouds"	Dan Reynolds; Wayne Sermon; Ben McKee	Registered by the American Society of Composers, Authors and Publishers (ASCAP); First appeared on a demo CD from 2008; Lyrics have undergone several revisions; Performed on the PBS program Vegas In Tune	
"Coffee"	Unknown	Appeared on "The Itch" and a Mercury Act 1 demo	
"Crash Course"	Unknown	Title appears on a whiteboard in The Making of Night Visions documentary	
"Curtain Call"	Dan Reynolds	Reynolds performed the song in 2008; Appeared on a demo CD from 2008	
"Dazed"	Dan Reynolds; Wayne Sermon; Ben McKee; Daniel Platzman; Tim Randolph	Registered by the American Society of Composers, Authors and Publishers (ASCAP) in 2018	and GEMA
"Darkness"	Unknown	Performed for an episode of AUDIO-FILES; Audio of the performance included on a compilation album of deep cuts available on the band's official website	
"Echo"	Dan Reynolds; Josh Mosser; Alex Da Kid	Registered by GEMA	
"Electricity"	Dan Reynolds; Josh Mosser; Alex Da Kid	Registered by GEMA	
"Everyone Believes"	Unknown	Title appears on a whiteboard in The Making of Night Visions documentary; A brief clip of McKee recording bass for the song appears in the documentary, confirmed by manager Mac Reynolds	
"Execution"	Unknown	Title appears on a whiteboard in the album trailer for Smoke + Mirrors	
"Face To Face"	Dan Reynolds; Wayne Sermon; Ben McKee; Daniel Platzman	Registered by GEMA	
"February"	Unknown	Two different songs by Imagine Dragons named "February" exist.; The first appeared on a demo CD from 2008, and was included on a compilation album of deep cuts available on the band's official website.; The second is from 2010, and appeared on a bootleg of leaks called "Velour Sampler". May also be called "I'm Sorry" by some fans.	
"Gen X"	Dan Reynolds; Josh Mosser; Alex Da Kid	Registered by GEMA	
"Go Easy"	Dan Reynolds; Wayne Sermon; Ben McKee; Daniel Platzman	Registered by GEMA	
"Haunting Me"	Dan Reynolds; Josh Mosser; Alex Da Kid	Registered by GEMA	
"Hollow"	Dan Reynolds; Josh Mosser; Alex Da Kid	Registered by GEMA; Contains lyrics from The Fall - "You were the one / You were the one / You were the one who set me free"	
"Holy Light"	Dan Reynolds; Wayne Sermon; Ben McKee; Daniel Platzman	Registered by GEMA	
"Home"	Unknown	The official name is Home, also known as Give It A Break by fans; Fans have also referred to the track by "Insane"; Featured in a 2010 video of the band working on their It's Time EP	
"I Got Love For You"	Dan Reynolds; Wayne Sermon; Ben McKee; Daniel Platzman	Registered by GEMA	
"I Wish You Well"	Unknown	First performed live at The Velour in April 2010; Studio version snippet first appeared in a May 2010 episode of the Blue Microphones podcast	
"I Will Let You Down"	Dan Reynolds; Josh Mosser; Alex Da Kid	Registered by GEMA	
"I'm Done"	Dan Reynolds; Wayne Sermon; Ben McKee; Daniel Platzman	Registered by GEMA	
"I'm Here For You"	Unknown	Performed once on August 6, 2010; Was given the names "We All Fall Down" / "To Fall Down" by fans	
"I'm Over It"	Unknown	Appeared on "The Itch"; Alternate shortened version colloquially named "Test"; Also known as "Forever"	
"I've Just Begun"	Unknown	Appeared on "The Itch"	
"Invincible"	Dan Reynolds; Wayne Sermon; Ben McKee; Daniel Platzman	Registered by GEMA; Working title for "Bones"	
"Just A Fake"	Dan Reynolds; Josh Mosser; Alex Da Kid	Registered by GEMA	
"Let It Out"	Dan Reynolds; Josh Mosser; Alex Da Kid	Registered by GEMA	
"Lifeless"	Dan Reynolds; Josh Mosser; Alex Da Kid	Registered by GEMA	
"Master Piece"	Dan Reynolds; Josh Mosser; Alex Da Kid	Registered by GEMA	
"New Wave"	Dan Reynolds; Wayne Sermon; Ben McKee; Daniel Platzman	Registered by GEMA	
"Nine Lives"	Unknown	Title appears on a whiteboard in a photo posted by engineer Matthew Sedivy in 2021	
"Off to War"	Unknown	First appeared on a demo CD from 2008	
"Primadonna"	Unknown	Appeared on "The Itch"	
"Rebel In Me"	Dan Reynolds; Josh Mosser; Alex Da Kid	Registered by GEMA	
"Revolution"	Dan Reynolds; Josh Mosser; Alex Da Kid	Registered by GEMA	
"Rob That Cradle"	Dan Reynolds; Josh Mosser; Alex Da Kid	Registered by GEMA	
"Run Away"	Dan Reynolds; Josh Mosser; Alex Da Kid	Registered by GEMA	
"Saints And Sinners"	Dan Reynolds; Wayne Sermon; Ben McKee; Daniel Platzman	Registered by GEMA	
"Seize the Day"	Dan Reynolds; Josh Mosser; Alex Da Kid	Registered by GEMA	
"Sleep These Days Away"	Dan Reynolds; Wayne Sermon; Ben McKee; Daniel Platzman	Registered by GEMA	
"Spaces In Between"	Unknown	Title appears on a whiteboard in a photo posted by engineer Matthew Sedivy in 2021	
"Star"	Unknown	Appeared on "The Itch"	
"Starlight"	Unknown	First performed live in 2010 as part of "30 Lives"; The studio demo and official acoustic versions of "30 Lives" do not include the "Starlight" section	
"Stars"	Unknown	First written in 2008; The lyrics to Stars were first posted online in full by an unknown source claiming it was played at a live concert; Band manager Mac Reynolds partially confirmed the song's existence when asked by fans about it, stating "I don't think you're crazy"; In 2021 at a fan's request, Stars was partially played during a livestream and thus confirmed the song's existence; Before the re-release of Hell and Silence, Stars appeared on the UK track listing as a bonus track before changing to "Easy" prior to release; Appeared on "The Itch" in 2025, ending a hunt lasting over a decade	
"Start All Over Again"	Unknown	Title partially appeared on a whiteboard in the album trailer for Smoke + Mirrors; Contains lyrics from Polaroid - "I'm gonna get ready / For the rain to pour heavy"	
"Stay"	Unknown	Two different Imagine Dragons songs named 'Stay' exist.; The first is a Mercury demo, with the title being seen on a whiteboard posted by Matthew Sedivy in 2021. May also be called "The Breaking Point" by some fans.; The second is a Loom demo, seen in the GEMA registration in 2023.	
"Suicide"	Dan Reynolds; Josh Mosser; Alex Da Kid	Registered by GEMA	
"Sunrise"	Dan Reynolds; Wayne Sermon; Ben McKee; Daniel Platzman	Registered by GEMA	
"Take My Heart Away"	Dan Reynolds	Demo recorded by Reynolds in August 2019, live on Twitch; Included on a compilation album of deep cuts available on the band's official website	
"Thank You"	Unknown	Title appears on a whiteboard in a photo posted by engineer Matthew Sedivy in 2021	
"The Tiger"	Dan Reynolds; Wayne Sermon; Ben McKee; Daniel Platzman	Registered by GEMA	
"Unseen"	Unknown	First appeared on a demo CD from 2008	
"Vampires"	Dan Reynolds; Josh Mosser; Alex Da Kid	Registered by GEMA	
"Venom In Me"	Dan Reynolds; Josh Mosser; Alex Da Kid	Registered by GEMA	
"Victimize Me"	Dan Reynolds; Josh Mosser; Alex Da Kid	Registered by GEMA	
"Voices"	Version 1: Dan Reynolds Version 2: Dan Reynolds; Wayne Sermon; Daniel Platzman; Ben McKee; Tim Randolph Version 3: Dan Reynolds; Tim Randolph Version 4: Dan Reynolds; Wayne Sermon; Daniel Platzman; Ben McKee; Tim Randolph	Registered by GEMA	
"Volume Drops"	Unknown	First appeared on a demo CD from 2008	
"Walk Away"	Dan Reynolds; Josh Mosser; Alex Da Kid	Registered by GEMA	
"We Gotta Move"	Dan Reynolds; Josh Mosser; Alex Da Kid	Registered by GEMA	
"Work for It"	Unknown	Appeared on "The Itch"	
