= Leave Me =

Leave Me may refer to:

- "Leave Me", a 2011 song by Imagine Dragons from It's Time
- "Leave Me", a 2017 song by J Hus from Common Sense
