= Live at Independent Records =

Live album by Imagine Dragons
- Released: April 20, 2013
- Recorded: August 31, 2012
- Studios: Independent Records (Denver, Colorado)
- Genres: Alternative rock; acoustic rock
- Length: 27:08
- Label: Interscope
- Producer: Alex da Kid

Imagine Dragons chronology
The Archive (2013)	Live at Independent Records (2013)	iTunes Session (2013)

Live at Independent Records is the debut live album by American rock band Imagine Dragons, released on April 20, 2013 through Interscope Records. The album, produced by Alex da Kid, was recorded at Independent Records in Denver, Colorado during an in-store performance on the night of August 31, 2012 in promotion of the then-upcoming debut studio album Night Visions. The album consists of acoustic versions of Imagine Dragons' first three singles and was released on Record Store Day as one of the event's many exclusive releases.

== Recording ==
"I never liked the word 'fan', just because it sounds just like a weird thing, like, when people are like, "yeah, my fans!". This is from the bottom of my heart, honestly, our favorite part about being a band is that we meet people and that we make friends, and I feel like at our shows you guys are just friends; people who understand our vision and want to hear more of it, and that to me is what has kept this band going."

— Dan Reynolds answering a question during the session.

The album was recorded during Imagine Dragons' performance at the Independent Records store in Denver, Colorado at 7pm on the night of Friday, August 31, 2012. The entire performance from start to finish was recorded, which lasted a full half-hour. Independent Records and Video is a music store chain primarily located in Colorado Springs, a town located south of Denver, Colorado. The store chain, which boasts 7 stores across the U.S. state of Colorado, has hosted many acts inside their stores during their thirty-year history, which, in recent years, included Vampire Weekend and The Lumineers. Imagine Dragons performed at the venue during the week of the release of the band's debut studio album Night Visions. During the concert, fans who had pre-ordered the album through Independent Records and Video were given advance copies of the album on compact disc.

Lead singer Dan Reynolds revealed during the performance that he had undergone throat surgery the month before the performance and that he had been advised by his doctor not to perform before the band's Fall 2012 Tour, which would begin the week after. However, he went on to make the performance anyway, saying that he wanted to keep his promise with the band's fans who had "supported us so much in the years that we've been together, and it means a lot to us, and this is the least we can do."

Lasting roughly 27 minutes, the session consisted of a three-song set consisting of two Q and A sessions which gave fans an insight into the band's life. The performance also notably marked the first ever performances of acoustic versions of the band's to-be second and third singles "Radioactive" and "Hear Me", publicly or recorded.

== Release ==
Live at Independent Records was released as a Record Store Day Exclusive. Released on April 20, 2013, the album came in a Slimline Jewel case, similar to those used in CD single and promotional single packaging. Record Store Day is a worldwide event that celebrates music and Record shops. In 2013, Record Store Day was held on April 20, and was celebrated by over 600 independent record stores in the United States alone and thousands more worldwide. The album was, however, only a United States exclusive. It is unknown whether the album will be given a full release.

== Track listing ==
All tracks are written by Ben McKee, Dan Platzman, Dan Reynolds and Wayne Sermon, except where noted.

No.	Title	Writer(s)	Length
1.	"Introduction"		3:20
2.	"It's Time"		6:35
3.	"Radioactive"	McKee; Platzman; Reynolds; Sermon; Alexander Grant; Josh Mosser	8:30
4.	"Hear Me"		8:43
Total length:			27:08

== Personnel ==
Imagine Dragons

- Dan Reynolds – lead vocals, rhythm guitar
- Wayne Sermon – lead guitar, backing vocals
- Ben McKee – bass, backing vocals
- Daniel Platzman – drums, percussion, backing vocals, viola

== Release history ==
Region	Date	Format	Label
United States	April 20, 2013	CD	Interscope Records; KIDinaKORNER
