= The Archive (EP) =

EP by Imagine Dragons
- Released: February 12, 2013
- Recorded: 2011–12
- Studios: Westlake Recording Studios, West Hollywood, California
- Genres: Alternative rock; pop rock
- Length: 18:15
- Labels: Kidinakorner; Interscope
- Producers: Alex Da Kid; Brandon Darner

Imagine Dragons chronology
Hear Me (2012)	The Archive (2013)	Live at Independent Records (2013)

The Archive is the seventh overall and first promotional EP by American rock band Imagine Dragons, released for a limited time on February 12, 2013 on the United States iTunes Store through Kidinakorner and Interscope. The EP was released as a forerunner EP to sell tracks from the then-upcoming deluxe edition of the band's debut studio album Night Visions before it was released in the United States.

== Track listing ==
Digital download
No.	Title	Length
1.	"Round and Round"	3:18
2.	"The River"	3:25
3.	"America"	4:34
4.	"Selene"	4:01
5.	"My Fault"	2:57
Total length:		18:15

== Charts ==
=== Weekly charts ===
Chart (2013)	Peak position
U.S. Billboard 200	134
U.S. Billboard Rock Albums	35
U.S. Billboard Alternative Albums	24

== Release history ==
Region	Date	Format	Label
United States	February 12, 2013	Digital download	Interscope Records
