= Hear Me (EP) =

EP by Imagine Dragons
- Released: November 25, 2012
- Recorded: 2011–12
- Studio: Westlake Recording Studios, West Hollywood, California
- Genre: Alternative rock; indie rock; pop rock
- Length: 14:25
- Label: Kidinakorner; Interscope
- Producer: Alex Da Kid; Brandon Darner

Imagine Dragons chronology
Night Visions (2012)	Hear Me (2012)	The Archive (2013)

Hear Me is the sixth EP by American rock band Imagine Dragons, released in the United Kingdom and Ireland on November 25, 2012. The EP was released to precede the release of the band's debut studio album, Night Visions in Europe, ala the Continued Silence EP in North America. The EP features "Hear Me" as the title track, and three other tracks from Night Visions.

== Release and promotion ==
The Hear Me EP was first announced on October 27, 2012. Imagine Dragons producer Alex da Kid announced the release of the EP on Twitter. A sample of the EP, lasting 2 minutes and 13 seconds was posted online afterwards. To further promote the release of the EP, the band devised a competition in which fans could receive free copies of the "Hear Me" CD single, signed by all four members of the band.

=== Singles ===
"Hear Me" was released as the lead single from Night Visions in the United Kingdom and Ireland, while "It's Time" served as the lead single in other regions, including the rest of Europe.

== Track listing ==
No.	Title	Writer(s)	Producer(s)	Length
1.	"Hear Me"	Ben McKee; Dan Reynolds; Daniel Wayne Sermon	Imagine Dragons	3:55
2.	"Radioactive"	Alex da Kid; Ben McKee; Dan Reynolds; Daniel Wayne Sermon; Josh Mosser	Alex da Kid	3:07
3.	"Amsterdam"	Ben McKee; Dan Reynolds; Daniel Wayne Sermon	Brandon Darner; Imagine Dragons	4:01
4.	"The River"	Ben McKee; Dan Reynolds; Daniel Wayne Sermon	Brandon Darner; Imagine Dragons	3:23
Total length:				14:25

== Release history ==
Region	Date	Format	Label
Ireland	November 25, 2012	Digital download; CD	Interscope Records
United Kingdom	November 25, 2012	Digital download; CD	Interscope Records
