= Andrew Tolman =

American studio musician and songwriter (born 1986)

- Born: January 9, 1986 (age 40)
- Origin: American Fork, Utah, U.S.
- Genres: Alternative rock; pop rock; indie rock; art rock
- Occupations: Musician; songwriter
- Instruments: Drums; percussion; vocals; guitar
- Years active: 2008–present
- Label: Elektra
- Member of: The Moth & The Flame; Tolman; Imagine Dragons

Andrew Tolman (born January 9, 1986) is an American studio musician and songwriter. He is a member of the cult club band the Moth & The Flame. He was also a founding member of the pop-rock band Imagine Dragons, leaving the group before the release of their debut album Night Visions in 2012, but returning as a touring member in 2023.

In 2016–17, Tolman went on tour with Mondo Cozmo as part of the backing band along with Drew Beck, Chris Null, and James Gordon.

== Personal life ==
Tolman is a graduate of Caleb Chapman's Soundhouse, a musician training program headquartered in Utah, and a former member of its flagship group, Caleb Chapman's Crescent Super Band. He also studied music at Brigham Young University.

He is married to keyboardist Brittany Tolman. They have two children together - daughter Joan, born in 2020, and son Jude, born in 2025.

== Career ==
=== Imagine Dragons (2008–2011; 2023–present) ===
Tolman's drumming can be heard on Imagine Dragons' first four EPs, Speak to Me (2008), Imagine Dragons (2009), Hell and Silence (2010), and It's Time (2011), along with his wife, Brittany, on keyboards and backing vocals. He and Brittany play on multiple songs from their debut album, Night Visions (2012) (including multi-platinum single "It's Time"; US #15, UK #23), despite leaving the group before its release.

In 2018, Andrew and Brittany re-joined Imagine Dragons during a show in Las Vegas for one song.

In 2023, Tolman filled in for Imagine Dragons' Daniel Platzman on drums for several shows of the Mercury World Tour before becoming the permanent touring drummer on the Loom World Tour in 2024.

=== The Moth & The Flame (2012–present) ===
Tolman's drumming can be heard on The Moth & The Flame's first EP, entitled & EP (2013), produced by Joey Waronker (Beck, Atoms for Peace, R.E.M.) and released via Hidden Records. A second EP, Young & Unafraid, was released via Elektra Records and produced by Peter Katis (The National, Interpol), Tony Hoffer (M83, Beck), and Nate Pyfer (Parlor Hawk, Fictionist). It included the single "Young & Unafraid," which reached #37 on the Billboard Alternative Songs chart.

=== Additional projects ===
Tolman is a studio drummer for Mount Saint, an indie pop group fronted by his wife and a former Imagine Dragons member.

In 2016, Andrew and his wife, Brittany, released two singles, "Chaperone" and "Freeway," for their alt pop duo, Tolman.

=== Equipment ===
Andrew endorses Yamaha drums, Istanbul Agop cymbals, and Remo drumheads.
