= Tiptoe (song) =

Song by Imagine Dragons

from the album Night Visions
- Released: September 4, 2012
- Recorded: 2011–2012
- Studio: Westlake Recording, West Hollywood, California
- Genre: Synth-pop
- Length: 3:14
- Label: KIDinaKORNER; Interscope; Universal
- Songwriters: Ben McKee; Daniel Platzman; Dan Reynolds; Wayne Sermon
- Producers: Ben McKee; Daniel Platzman; Dan Reynolds; Wayne Sermon

"Tiptoe" is a song written and recorded by American rock band Imagine Dragons, for their debut studio album Night Visions. The song appears as the second track on the album.

Bubbling under the Billboard Hot 100 at number 13, it also peaked at number 34 on the Billboard Rock songs chart. The group performed the song at the 2014 Billboard Music Awards.

== Composition ==
The theme of the song deals with the speaker's victory over something momentous, despite him not being noticed or recognized by others. The intro to the song is entirely guitar parts that mimic synthesizer parts. It is composed in the key of B♭ minor.

== Charts ==
=== Weekly charts ===
| Chart (2012) | Peak position |
|---|---|
| UK Singles (Official Charts Company) | 182 |
| US Billboard Bubbling Under Hot 100 | 13 |
| US Rock Songs (Billboard) | 34 |

=== Year-end charts ===
| Chart (2013) | Position |
|---|---|
| US Billboard Hot Rock Songs | 80 |

== Certifications ==
| Region | Certification | Certified units/sales |
|---|---|---|
| United States (RIAA) | Platinum | 1,000,000^{‡} |
^{‡} Sales+streaming figures based on certification alone.
