= ITunes Session (Imagine Dragons EP) =

2013 extended play by Imagine Dragons

iTunes Session

EP by Imagine Dragons
- Released: May 28, 2013
- Recorded: 2013
- Genres: Acoustic rock; alternative rock; indie rock
- Length: 19:30
- Labels: Kidinakorner; Interscope

Imagine Dragons chronology
Live at Independent Records (2013)	iTunes Session (2013)	Night Visions Live (2014)

iTunes Session is the eighth overall and first live EP by American rock band Imagine Dragons released on May 28, 2013 through Kidinakorner and Interscope.

== Track listing ==
No.	Title	Length
1.	"It's Time (iTunes Sessions)"	4:05
2.	"Radioactive (iTunes Sessions)"	4:21
3.	"Amsterdam (iTunes Sessions)"	3:52
4.	"30 Lives (iTunes Sessions)"	3:19
5.	"Destination (iTunes Sessions)"	3:53
Total length:		19:30

== Charts ==
Chart (2013)	Peak position
US Billboard 200	56
US Digital Albums (Billboard)	23
US Top Rock Albums (Billboard)	17
US Top Alternative Albums (Billboard)	13

== Release history ==
Region	Date	Format	Label
Canada	May 28, 2013	Digital download	Interscope Records; KIDinaKORNER
Mexico	May 28, 2013	Digital download	Interscope Records; KIDinaKORNER
United States	May 28, 2013	Digital download	Interscope Records; KIDinaKORNER
Australia	May 29, 2013	Digital download	Interscope Records; KIDinaKORNER
Belgium	May 29, 2013	Digital download	Interscope Records; KIDinaKORNER
France	May 29, 2013	Digital download	Interscope Records; KIDinaKORNER
Germany	May 29, 2013	Digital download	Interscope Records; KIDinaKORNER
New Zealand	May 29, 2013	Digital download	Interscope Records; KIDinaKORNER
United Kingdom	May 29, 2013	Digital download	Interscope Records; KIDinaKORNER
