= Imagine Dragons (EP) =

EP by Imagine Dragons
- Released: August 24, 2009
- Studio: Battle Born Studios
- Genres: Alternative rock, indie rock
- Length: 19:45
- Labels: Self-released; Interscope (reissue); Kidinakorner (reissue)
- Producer: Imagine Dragons

Imagine Dragons chronology
Speak to Me (2008)	Imagine Dragons (2009)	Hell and Silence (2010)

Imagine Dragons is the second extended play (EP) by the American rock band of the same name, released on August 24, 2009. It was recorded at Battle Born Studios. All songs were written and produced by Imagine Dragons. Engineering was done by Robert Root. Tracks from the EP featured on Windows Media Player after the band won a competition on Reverbnation. The track "I Need a Minute" cracked the CMJ Radio 200. "Cover Up" appears on various deluxe editions of the band's debut album Night Visions.

On October 15, 2021, the EP was reissued through Kidinakorner and Interscope Records and re-released onto streaming platforms with the previously unreleased bonus track "Hole Inside Our Chests".

== Release ==
On June 26, 2009, the band released the first song "Uptight" on MySpace. On July 24, they released two songs "I Need a Minute" and "Cover Up".

On October 15, 2021, the EP was re-released onto streaming platforms with the previously unreleased bonus track "Hole Inside Our Chests".

== Cover art ==
The album art is an autostereogram, which features a dragon facing to the right.

== Film and television ==
- "I Need a Minute" was featured on MTV's The Real World: San Diego.
- "Cover Up" was featured in commercials for MLS' Real Salt Lake.
- "Cover Up" was also featured in commercials for BYUtv's indie music show AUDIO-FILES.

== Track listing ==
All tracks are written by Imagine Dragons (Dan Reynolds, Wayne Sermon, Ben McKee, Andrew Tolman, Brittany Tolman), except where noted.

No.	Title	Writer(s)	Length
1.	"I Need a Minute"		3:27
2.	"Uptight"		3:43
3.	"Cover Up"	Dan Reynolds; Wayne Sermon; Ben McKee	4:18
4.	"Curse"		3:46
5.	"Drive"		4:32
Total length:			19:45

2021 re-release (bonus track)
No.	Title	Length
6.	"Hole Inside Our Chests"	2:38
Total length:		22:23

== Personnel ==
- Robert Root - engineer

Imagine Dragons:

- Dan Reynolds – lead vocals
- Wayne Sermon – guitar
- Ben McKee – bass guitar
- Andrew Tolman – drums
- Brittany Tolman – keyboard, backing vocals

== Critical reaction ==
Jason Bracelin, writing in the Las Vegas Review-Journal, described the EP by stating "Upon taking in this bunch's new EP you get the sense that they could probably turn the recitation of the ingredients to a bottle of Prell into an arms-in-the-air anthem. With outsized synth lines, ringing, perpetually cresting guitars and massive syncopated beats and cymbal splashes, Imagine Dragons don't make any bones about believing that bigger is always better... it'll only be a matter of time before a song like 'Curse' is all over the radio."
