= Bleeding Out (song) =

Song by Imagine Dragons

from the album Night Visions
- Released: September 4, 2012
- Recorded: 2011–2012
- Studio: Westlake Recording, West Hollywood, California
- Genre: Alternative rock; alternative pop; electronic rock
- Length: 3:43
- Label: KIDinaKORNER; Interscope; Universal
- Songwriters: Alexander Grant; Ben McKee; Josh Mosser; Dan Reynolds; Wayne Sermon
- Producer: Alex da Kid

"Bleeding Out" is a song written and recorded by American rock band Imagine Dragons for their debut studio album Night Visions (2012). The song appears as the ninth track on the album. The song peaked at number 30 on the Billboard Rock Songs chart.

== Composition ==
"Bleeding Out"
"Bleeding Out" features broken record effects and synthesizer jabs to create a dark tone and mood to the song.

"Bleeding Out" runs at 84 beats per minute. The song, compared to the former half of the Night Visions album, is one of Imagine Dragons' darker songs, and like most of the songs on Night Visions, it makes use of the Bass drum to set the overall tone and mood of the song. The song incorporates a jagged-edge production effect, where the guitar chords are separately recorded and mixed separately from the recording itself. When chords in the song are not repeated and flow through, the recording plays normally. However, if the chords repeat themselves, they literally repeat themselves in the recording as well to produce a broken record effect, as if the recording is skipping over itself. The song also makes use of synthesizer jabs to emphasize the belligerency of the song's atmosphere and mood. Also notable is that the lead-in unusually lasts three beats, unlike most songs where usually the lead-in would last two or a single beat before the song starts.

== Live performances ==
"Bleeding Out" was first played live during the fall of 2012. It was played on 72 shows of the Night Visions Tour in 2013, six times on the Into the Night Tour in 2014, and 18 times during the Smoke + Mirrors Tour in 2015. It has since been played acoustic during the Evolve World Tour.

== Charts ==
=== Weekly charts ===
Chart (2012–14)	Peak position
New Zealand (Recorded Music NZ)	35
UK Singles (Official Charts Company)	161
US Hot Rock & Alternative Songs (Billboard)	30

=== Year-end charts ===
Chart (2013)	Position
US Billboard Hot Rock Songs	58

== Certifications ==
Region	Certification	Certified units/sales
Brazil (Pro-Música Brasil)	Gold	30,000^{‡}
New Zealand (RMNZ)	Gold	7,500^{*}
United Kingdom (BPI)	Silver	200,000^{‡}
United States (RIAA)	Platinum	1,000,000^{‡}
^{*} Sales figures based on certification alone.^{‡} Sales+streaming figures based on certification alone.
