= Hell and Silence =

EP by Imagine Dragons
- Released: March 12, 2010
- Recorded: 2009
- Studios: Battle Born Studios (Paradise, Nevada, United States)
- Genre: Alternative rock
- Length: 17:48
- Labels: Self-released; Interscope (reissue); Kidinakorner (reissue)
- Producer: Imagine Dragons

Imagine Dragons chronology
Imagine Dragons (2009)	Hell and Silence (2010)	It's Time (2011)

Hell and Silence (stylized in all lowercase) is the third extended play (EP) by American pop rock band Imagine Dragons, released on March 12, 2010. It was recorded at Battle Born Studios. All songs were written and produced by Imagine Dragons. "Hear Me" was remastered and included on the band's debut album Night Visions, while "I Don't Mind" and "Selene" were placed on deluxe editions.

To promote the EP, the band performed five shows at SXSW 2010 including at the BMI Official Showcase. While at SXSW they were endorsed by Blue Microphones. They also toured the western United States with Nico Vega and Saint Motel. They also performed at Bite of Las Vegas Festival 2010, New Noise Music Festival, Neon Reverb Festival, and Fork Fest. The name of the EP comes from the bridge of the song "Emma".

On October 15, 2021, the EP was reissued through Kidinakorner and Interscope Records and re-released onto streaming platforms with the previously unreleased bonus track "Easy".

== Release ==
On 1 October 2009, "Selene" was released on MySpace. On 18 November, "Emma" too got released on MySpace.

On 25 January 2010, the band performed a live debut of "All Eyes" on FOX News. Two days later, "I Don't Mind" debuted.^{[source needed]}

On 10 February 2010, the band posted a vlog on their YouTube channel featuring an instrumental demo of "Hear Me". Six days later, they posted another vlog which featured the lead guitarist Wayne Sermon playing the mandolin riff of the bridge of "I Don't Mind".

"All Eyes" soon saw a release on 24 February and "Hear Me" was released two days later. "I Don't Mind" was the final track off the EP and was released on 9 March.

A compilation of all these released tracks were released as the Hell and Silence EP on 12 March 2010 through a release party at the Beauty Bar venue at Las Vegas.

More than a decade later on 15 October 2021, the EP was re-released onto streaming platforms with the previously unreleased bonus track "Easy" from the Smoke + Mirrors timeframe.

== Film and television ==
"All Eyes" was featured in the Degrassi: The Next Generation episode Drop It Like It's Hot (Part One). "I Don't Mind" was featured in the promo commercials for American Idol season 11 and MTV's World of Jenks.

"Hear Me" was featured in the soundtrack to the feature film Answers to Nothing, MTV's The Real World: Las Vegas, and performed live on PBS' Vegas In Tune.

== Track listing ==
All songs produced by Imagine Dragons (Ben McKee, Wayne Sermon, Dan Reynolds, Andrew Tolman and Brittany Tolman).

No.	Title	Writer(s)	Length
1.	"All Eyes"	Dan Reynolds; Wayne Sermon; Ben McKee; Andrew Tolman; Brittany Tolman	3:00
2.	"I Don't Mind"	Reynolds; Sermon; McKee	3:18
3.	"Hear Me"	Reynolds; Sermon; McKee	3:54
4.	"Selene"	Reynolds; Sermon; McKee	4:05
5.	"Emma"	Reynolds; Sermon; McKee; A. Tolman; B. Tolman	3:33
Total length:			17:48

2021 re-release (bonus track)
No.	Title	Writer(s)	Length
6.	"Easy"	Reynolds; Sermon; McKee	4:54
Total length:			22:12

== Personnel ==
- Dan Reynolds – lead vocals
- Wayne Sermon – guitar
- Ben McKee – bass guitar
- Andrew Tolman – drums
- Brittany Tolman – keyboard, backing vocals

== Reception ==
Jason Bracelin, writing in the Las Vegas Review-Journal, gave a glowing review of the EP by stating "Dan Reynolds sounds like a dude with a bull's-eye for a heart". He continues "With its staccato vocal delivery and huge keys, "All Eyes" sounds destined for the airwaves, the same of which could be said of the wistful "Emma," with its dizzy synth lines and coed harmonies, and the climactic "I Don't Mind," which is powered by ricocheting guitars."
