= Audio-Files =

- Created by: Matt Eastin
- Country of origin: United States

Production
- Running time: 30 minutes

Original release
- Network: BYUtv
- Release: April 10, 2012 – May 6, 2013

Audio-Files is a television music series produced by BYUtv. The series combines interviews, concerts, and behind-the-scenes footage of nationally rising indie bands. The show premiered on April 10, 2012, at 6:30 pm MST, 8:30 pm EST.

On March 3, 2012, the first promo commercial was released. On March 29, 2012, BYUtv housed a pre-screening inside BYU's new broadcasting building. The show's first press release was on February 29, 2012. Past episodes can be viewed on the show's website.

The first season featured rising bands including Neon Trees (Mercury), Imagine Dragons (Interscope), Mason Jennings (Brushfire), Trampled By Turtles (Banjodad), Low (Sub Pop), Damien Jurado (Secretly Canadian), Joshua James (Northplatte), and Paper Route (Universal Motown).

The second season featured bands including The Head and the Heart (Sub Pop), The Album Leaf (Sub Pop), Mates of State (Barsuk), Nada Surf (Barsuk), Akron/Family (Dead Oceans), and more.

Salt Lake City Weekly named the series "Best Music Television 2013".

== List of artists have performed on Audio-Files ==
Episode	Name	Air Date
01	Imagine Dragons	2012-04-10
02	Mason Jennings	2012-04-24
03	Paper Route	2012-05-01
04	Low	2012-05-15
06	Joshua James	2012-05-22
07	Trampled By Turtles	2012-07-10
08	Ramona Falls	2012-07-17
09	Damien Jurado	2012-07-31
10	Neon Trees	2012-08-07
11	The Head and the Heart	2012-11-15
12	The Album Leaf	2012-11-29
13	Mates of State	2013-04-01
14	Akron/Family	2013-04-08
15	Nada Surf	2013-05-06
