= Round and Round (Imagine Dragons song) =

Promotional single by Imagine Dragons

from the album Continued Silence
- Released: December 14, 2012
- Recorded: 2011–2012
- Studio: Westlake Recording, West Hollywood, California
- Length: 3:17
- Label: Interscope; Universal
- Songwriters: Ben McKee; Dan Platzman; Dan Reynolds; Wayne Sermon; Alexander Grant

Imagine Dragons promotional singles chronology
"Amsterdam" (2012)	"Round and Round" (2012)	"Smoke and Mirrors" (2015)

"Round and Round" is a song written and recorded by American indie rock band Imagine Dragons for their major label debut EP Continued Silence. The song appears as the fourth track on the EP. Following inclusions on the setlists of many of the band's concerts and appearances as B-sides to their singles "It's Time" and "Hear Me", the song was also included on the worldwide release of their debut studio album, Night Visions as a deluxe edition track.

== Release ==
"Round and Round" first appeared on the band's EP Continued Silence, which released on February 14, 2012. The song was later released on December 14, 2012 as a digital promotional single in the United Kingdom and Ireland. Since Continued Silence was not released in the region, "Round and Round" was offered as a free download on the iTunes Store and as a B-side to the "Hear Me" single. The song was eventually released worldwide on a deluxe edition of the band's debut album Night Visions, in February 2013.

The band performed the song live on Fuse's Hoppus on Music on March 15, 2012.

== Track listing ==
Digital download
No.	Title	Length
1.	"Round and Round"	3:17

== Charts ==
Chart (2012–13)	Peak position
US Rock Songs (Billboard)	41

== Certifications ==
Region	Certification	Certified units/sales
United States (RIAA)	Gold	500,000^{‡}
^{‡} Sales+streaming figures based on certification alone.

== Release history ==
Country	Date	Format	Label
Ireland	December 14, 2012	Digital download	Interscope Records
United Kingdom	December 14, 2012	Digital download	Interscope Records
