= Continued Silence =

EP by Imagine Dragons
- Released: February 14, 2012
- Studio: Westlake Recording Studios (West Hollywood, California)
- Genres: Alternative rock; indie rock; pop rock; pop
- Length: 19:25
- Labels: KidinaKorner; Interscope
- Producer: Alex da Kid

Imagine Dragons chronology
It's Time (2011)	Continued Silence (2012)	Night Visions (2012)

Continued Silence is the fifth extended play (EP) by American rock band Imagine Dragons, released on February 14, 2012 by KidinaKorner and Interscope Records. It was recorded at Westlake Recording Studios. All songs were written by Imagine Dragons and produced by Alex da Kid, with mixing by engineer Manny Marroquin and engineer Rich Costey. The EP was mastered by mastering engineer Joe LaPorta. All of the songs on Continued Silence were featured on the band's debut album Night Visions except for "My Fault" and "Round and Round", which were later included on deluxe editions of the album. Previous purchases of songs from the EP counted towards Night Visions and decreased its price.

== Personnel ==
Imagine Dragons

- Dan Reynolds – lead vocals
- Daniel Wayne Sermon – guitars, backing vocals
- Ben McKee – bass, backing vocals
- Daniel Platzman – drums, backing vocals

== Release and promotion ==
To promote the album, the band performed at SXSW 2012 and toured the United States with Australian group The Jezabels. Their more than fifteen SXSW performances included the broadcast mtvU Woodie Awards Festival as well as the FILTER party, Rachael Ray's party, and The Roxy's party. They also performed at Basilica Block Party, Summerfest, Bunbury Music Festival 2012, Live 105's BFD 2012 and Firefly Music Festival 2012. They also performed at Chicago's Riot Fest 2012. iTunes featured the EP on its "Rising Stars of Alt Rock" in addition to featuring track "It's Time" on its $0.69 "Alt Rock Hits" beginning April 30, 2012.

=== Singles ===
"It's Time" became the first single from the EP and began receiving airplay on February 20, 2012. The track "Radioactive" also both received airplay and charted on the Billboard Hot 100. The official music video for "It's Time" debuted on all MTV affiliates on April 17, 2012. Imagine Dragons were the MTV PUSH Artist of the Week of April 16, 2012.

The song "Round and Round" was featured as "Song of the Week" and thus a free download on iTunes.

== Reception ==
=== Critical reception ===
Continued Silence was praised by music critics. Jason Bracelin of the Las Vegas Review-Journal and Spin wrote, "'Silence' builds on the Dragons' climactic, dance floor-worthy swagger, with supersized, arms-in-the-air choruses and a buoyant groove amplified by the introduction of sub-hip-hop beats". Cincinnati CityBeat wrote "A quick spin through Continued Silence...is like panning in a creek bedded with gold nuggets; glints of Coldplay, Everclear, Train and any number of other chart-topping Pop icons, but with a discernibly beat-driven Indie edge. As epic as Homerian poetry set to a U2 soundtrack and as intimate as a candlelight dinner in the Nevada desert."

=== Commercial performance ===
The EP reached number 40 on the Billboard 200 and number 1 on the Billboard Heatseekers Albums chart.

== Track listing ==
No.	Title	Writer(s)	Producer(s)	Length
1.	"Radioactive"	Alex da Kid; Ben McKee; Dan Reynolds; Daniel Wayne Sermon; Josh Mosser	Alex da Kid	3:06
2.	"Demons"	Alex da Kid; McKee; Reynolds; Sermon; Mosser	Alex da Kid	2:57
3.	"On Top of the World"	Alex da Kid; McKee; Reynolds; Sermon	Alex da Kid; Imagine Dragons	3:12
4.	"Round and Round"	Alex da Kid; McKee; Reynolds; Sermon	Alex da Kid; Imagine Dragons	3:17
5.	"It's Time"	McKee; Reynolds; Sermon	Brandon Darner; Imagine Dragons	4:00
6.	"My Fault"	Alex da Kid; McKee; Reynolds; Sermon	Alex da Kid; Imagine Dragons	2:56
Total length:				19:25

== Chart performance ==
Chart	Peak position
Irish Albums Chart	86
US Billboard 200	40
US Billboard Alternative Albums	8
US Billboard Rock Albums	11
US Billboard Digital Albums	18
US Billboard Heatseekers Albums	1
Swedish Albums Chart	20

== Certifications ==
Region	Certification	Certified units/sales
New Zealand (RMNZ)	Platinum	15,000^{‡}
United Kingdom (BPI)	Gold	100,000^{‡}
^{‡} Sales+streaming figures based on certification alone.

== Release history ==
Region	Date	Format	Label
United States	February 14, 2012	Digital download; CD	Interscope Records
