= It's Time (EP) =

EP by Imagine Dragons
- Released: March 12, 2011
- Recorded: Autumn 2010
- Studio: Studio X
- Genres: Alternative rock; indie rock; pop rock
- Length: 31:59
- Labels: Self-released; Interscope (reissue); Kidinakorner (reissue)
- Producers: Imagine Dragons; Brandon Darner

Imagine Dragons chronology
Hell and Silence (2010)	It's Time (2011)	Continued Silence (2012)

It's Time is the fourth extended play (EP) by American pop rock band Imagine Dragons, released on March 12, 2011. It was recorded inside of Studio X at the Palms Hotel and Casino during the autumn of 2010. All songs were written and produced by Imagine Dragons and mixed by Grammy-nominated engineer Mark Needham.

To promote the EP, the band toured with The Parlotones and performed at Bergenfest 2011, SSMF 2011, and Bite of Las Vegas 2011. The track "America" was also promoted via AOL Jobs. The album was awarded "Best CD of 2011" by Vegas Seven Magazine. Title track "It's Time" was also a #1 MIX Most Requested Song on MIX 94.1FM in Las Vegas during October 2011 and charted on the Billboard Heatseekers chart in the Mountain Range. "It's Time" and "Amsterdam" were included on the band's debut album Night Visions, while "Tokyo", "The River", and "America" appear on various deluxe editions of the album.

On October 15, 2021, the EP was reissued through Kidinakorner and Interscope Records and re-released onto streaming platforms with the previously unreleased bonus track "Dolphins".

== Release ==
On 22 May 2010, the band posted a video featuring 4 snippets of new demos they were working on. Out of these, only "Pantomime" managed to get a release on the EP.

On 23 June, they released a music video for the song "America".

During the summer of 2010, the band began introducing newer material into their live performances. With the exception of "It's Time" and "Pantomime," early versions of the remaining tracks were played live before the EP's release in March 2011.

On 16 September, the band posted a video of them working at the Palms Studio, Las Vegas with the instrumental demos of "Amsterdam" and "It's Time" played in the background. The video also features the band playing around with a high-pitched version of their song "The River".

A music video for "The River" was soon uploaded on their YouTube channel on 19 December. "It's Time" also got a visuals video two days later. "Amsterdam" got a music video on New Year's Eve. A preview of "Tokyo" was posted on the same day. "Look How Far We've Come" got a music video on 3 January 2011. A video featuring a compilation of dance clips from fans was made for "Tokyo" on 10 January. The final music video was made for "Pantomime" on 14 February featuring the band performing a lyric prank on a lady.

On 9 March 2011, the band announced the name of the EP on Twitter.

The EP was finally released on iTunes and CDBaby on 12 March 2011, "Leave Me" being the only previously unreleased song on it.

== Film and television ==
- "It's Time" was featured on commercials for MLS' Real Salt Lake and in the trailer for the American film adaptation of The Perks of Being a Wallflower.
- "Tokyo", "America" (wrongly credited as The Parlotones), and "Leave Me" were featured on CBS's Around the World for Free (Season 3).
- "It's Time" was featured in season 12 of Degrassi in the episodes "Never Ever" Part One and Part Two.
- "It's Time" was sung by Blaine Anderson (portrayed by Darren Criss) in the Season 4 premiere of Glee.
- "It's Time" was used as background music for an Apple Keynote Event presentation in September 2012.
- "It's Time" was used as background music for a National Geographic 2013 commercial in South America.
- "America" was used in the 2014 documentary America: Imagine the World Without Her by Dinesh D'Souza.

== Track listing ==
All songs are produced by Imagine Dragons (Dan Reynolds, Wayne Sermon, Ben McKee, Andrew Tolman, Brittany Tolman), except where noted

No.	Title	Writer(s)	Producer(s)	Length
1.	"It's Time"	Dan Reynolds; Wayne Sermon; Ben McKee	Imagine Dragons; Brandon Darner	4:00
2.	"Amsterdam"	Reynolds; Sermon; McKee	Imagine Dragons; Darner	4:01
3.	"Tokyo"	Reynolds; Sermon; McKee	Imagine Dragons; Darner	3:16
4.	"The River"	Reynolds; Sermon; McKee	Imagine Dragons; Darner	3:25
5.	"Leave Me"	Reynolds; Sermon; McKee; Andrew Tolman; Brittany Tolman		3:32
6.	"Pantomime"	Reynolds; Sermon; McKee; A. Tolman; B. Tolman		5:02
7.	"Look How Far We've Come"	Reynolds; Sermon; McKee; A. Tolman; B. Tolman		4:07
8.	"America"	Reynolds; Sermon; McKee		4:33
Total length:				31:59

2021 re-release (bonus track)
No.	Title	Writer(s)	Length
9.	"Dolphins"	Reynolds; Sermon; McKee; A. Tolman; B. Tolman	3:33
Total length:			35:31

== Critical reaction ==
Professional ratings
Review scores
Source	Rating
Las Vegas Review-Journal	(very favorable)
Vegas SEVEN	(very favorable)

The record was released to largely positive critical and fan reaction. Las Vegas Review-Journal gave the record a very positive review, quipping "The craftsmanship here is impeccable, hard to believe this band is still unsigned". Vegas SEVEN also gave the record a very positive review and wrote that "...It's Time contains eight of the best rock songs I've heard this year, particularly the soaring, guitar-chiming 'Amsterdam', which gives Coldplay a run for their epic, anthemic pop songwriting money. Dan Reynolds and Brittany Tolman's harmonizing on the chorus makes the hair on my neck stand up, and I just can't understand what's left for this remarkable quintet to accomplish locally. They've won every battle of the bands, been featured in every newspaper and earned every distinction. Damn, they've even opened for Weezer and Interpol. If Universal doesn't sign these guys, then I give up." Vegas SEVEN magazine also awarded the album "Best CD of 2011" in their Best Of issue.
