= It's Time (song) =

2012 single by Imagine Dragons

Single by Imagine Dragons

from the EP Continued Silence and the album Night Visions
- Released: February 6, 2012
- Recorded: 2010
- Studio: Studio at the Palms (Paradise, Nevada)
- Genre: Alternative rock; folk-pop
- Length: 4:00
- Label: Interscope; KIDinaKORNER
- Songwriters: Ben McKee; Dan Reynolds; Daniel Wayne Sermon
- Producers: Brandon Darner; Imagine Dragons

Imagine Dragons singles chronology
"It's Time" (2012)	"Radioactive" (2012)

Music video
- "It's Time" on YouTube

"It's Time" is the debut single by American rock band Imagine Dragons, released on February 6, 2012, as the lead single from the band's first major label EP, Continued Silence. Later that year the song was included on the band's first full album, Night Visions. The song had already been included on the band's independently released EP It's Time (2011), and it had been available on YouTube since 2010.

The song's production was handled by Brandon Darner, and its lyrics describe the narrator's resistance to change in the face of great turmoil. The single was created without Daniel Platzman, who joined the group later, and it includes contributions from early band members Andrew and Brittany Tolman.

After "It's Time" was covered on Glee in September 2012 and gained heavy rotation in commercials and television shows, it reached number 15 on the Billboard Hot 100, making it the band's first Top 40 single. It also hit number 4 on Alternative Airplay, number 2 on Adult Alternative Airplay, and number 3 on the Hot Rock & Alternative Songs chart. Lasting 32 weeks, it had the longest run on the Alternative Songs Top 10 in 2012. The single reached the top 10 in Austria (number 6), Czech Republic (number 10), Ireland (number 9), India (number 17) Japan (number 7), Billboard Pop Songs (number 10), and Portugal (number 6) and peaked at number 23 in the United Kingdom. It was certified Platinum by the RIAA and CRIA, and Platinum by the ARIA. It was also nominated for Best Rock Video at the 2012 MTV Video Music Awards.

In February 2021, for the 25th anniversary of Adult Alternative Airplay, Billboard ranked "It's Time" at number 7 on its list of the 100 most successful songs in the chart's history; in September 2023, the magazine ranked the song at number 87 on a similar retrospective list for the 35th anniversary of Alternative Airplay.

== Background ==
Dan Reynolds told The Huffington Post about the writing process for the song:

There's so many times you wake up at 3 a.m., grab a recorder on the iPhone and say something—a lyrical idea or melody—and then you lay it out in Logic later on and sometimes it makes no sense. We sat with 'It's Time' for a year or year-and-a-half. Sometimes you just have to let a song sit for a while. There's just something really special about it. I wrote it during a very hard time in my life. I had dropped out of college, and I was just sitting down at my computer, and I came up with this rhythm. And the words just wrote themselves. I knew I had something special coming. When a song is most honest and most raw that's when you know you're doing something right. A lot of my favorite artists are able to be in touch with their problems and put it through melodies. It happens all the time with bands."

== Music video ==
The music video debuted on April 17, 2012, on all MTV affiliates and the band was named PUSH Artist of the Week and later featured on PUSH Live. A first teaser released March 28, 2012. The video also reached number 1 on Yahoo Music's Top Videos.

The video starts with the band walking through a barren wasteland beneath a dark, cloudy sky. The sky begins to grow more turbulent as the band walks past old flags, boat wreckage, a destroyed bridge, and dead trees. Bassist Ben McKee opens a box he has been carrying and a pale light glows from within. The band removes a pebble-sized, glowing orb from the box. They dig a hole for it with their hands, and then drop the orb into the ground. Lead singer Dan Reynolds then shouts, and in the next scene the band members are shown running away from their dig site. A large explosion throws Reynolds into the air where he seems to levitate (similarly to the Continued Silence album cover). Finally, the clouds begin to part and the sunlight shines through.

The music video was produced by Todd Makurath and directed by Anthony Leonardi III. Ian Clemmer, who created some of the visual effects, wrote on his website that he "was asked to create big, large scale smoke explosions in a short amount of time, these are the end shots of the video ...."

About two months after the original music video, another one was created for the Jailbreaks remix.

== Usage in media ==
- Voted by Entertainment Weekly readers number 8 on "The Best Singles of 2012".
- Featured in BYUtv's AUDIO-FILES pilot episode about the band
- Featured in Gossip Girl (season 6) in the series finale episode New York, I Love You XOXO
- Featured in the theatrical trailer for the 2012 film adaptation of the 1999 coming-of-age novel The Perks of Being a Wallflower.
- The song was featured in the "Explorer TOP 125" ad for the National Geographic Channel.
- The song was used for promotional clip for French television channel D8.
- In 2012, Darren Criss (as his character Blaine Anderson) covered "It's Time" in the season 4 premiere of the musical TV series Glee. The song also charted on the Billboard Hot 100 at number 15 as well as the Canadian Hot 100 at number 30.
- The song is used in commercials of the Chilean telecommunications company VTR.

== Live performances ==
On July 16, 2012, Imagine Dragons performed "It's Time" on The Tonight Show with Jay Leno. They also performed the song live on Jimmy Kimmel Live! on September 4, 2012, and on Conan on January 9, 2013. They also performed the song on Late Night with Jimmy Fallon on October 29, 2012, notable for being broadcast during Hurricane Sandy. As a result, they performed the song to an empty audience, with only the cast and crew of Late Night being present. The band also performed and singer Dan Reynolds was interviewed on Norwegian and Swedish television show Skavlan on February 1, 2013.

Imagine Dragons plays "It's Time" at its live concerts, and although it's a "bigger single", the band plays it early in their set list rather than last, as might be expected.

On December 5, 2014, the group played an acoustic version at the end of The Game Awards (the inaugural ceremonies of said award show), with Nintendo composer Koji Kondo playing on the piano as part of a medley of music from The Legend of Zelda series.

== Personnel ==
- Dan Reynolds – vocals
- Wayne Sermon – guitar, mandolin
- Ben McKee – bass guitar
- Andrew Tolman – drums, backing vocals, acoustic rhythm guitar
- Brittany Tolman – keyboard, backing vocals

== Track listing ==
All tracks are written by Dan Reynolds, Wayne Sermon, Ben McKee, Daniel Platzman, except where noted.

Digital download
No.	Title	Producer(s)	Length
1.	"It's Time"	Reynolds, Sermon, McKee, Platzman, Brandon Darner	4:00
Total length:			4:00

Maxi digital download
No.	Title	Producer(s)	Length
1.	"It's Time"	Reynolds, Sermon, McKee, Platzman, Darner	4:00
2.	"It's Time" (Passion Pit Remix)	Reynolds, Sermon, McKee, Platzman, Darner, Michael Angelakos, Ian Hultquist, Jeff Apruzzese, Xander Singh	4:30
3.	"It's Time" (Jailbreaks Remix)	Reynolds, Sermon, McKee, Platzman, Darner, Jailbreaks	4:26
4.	"Round and Round" (written by Reynolds, Sermon, McKee, Platzman, Alex da Kid)	Reynolds, Sermon, McKee, Platzman, Kid	3:17
Total length:			16:23

Remixes EP
No.	Title	Length
1.	"It's Time" (Penguin Prison remix)	4:23
2.	"It's Time" (Kat Krazy Remix)	3:28
3.	"It's Time" (Jailbreaks Remix)	4:26
4.	"It's Time" (StunGun and Jailbreaks Remix)	5:06

== Charts ==
=== Weekly charts ===
Weekly chart performance for "It's Time"
Chart (2012–2014)	Peak position
Australia (ARIA)	27
Austria (Ö3 Austria Top 40)	6
Belgium (Ultratip Bubbling Under Flanders)	1
Belgium (Ultratip Bubbling Under Wallonia)	3
Brazil (Billboard Brasil Hot 100)	71
Brazil Hot Pop Songs (Billboard Brasil)	26
Canada Hot 100 (Billboard)	30
Canada CHR/Top 40 (Billboard)	22
Canada Hot AC (Billboard)	30
Czech Republic Airplay (ČNS IFPI)	10
Czech Republic Singles Digital (ČNS IFPI)	84
France (SNEP)	101
Germany (GfK)	20
Iceland (RÚV)	14
Ireland (IRMA)	9
Italy (FIMI)	20
Japan Hot 100 (Billboard)	7
Lebanon (Lebanese Top 20)	9
Netherlands (Dutch Top 40)	36
New Zealand (Recorded Music NZ)	37
Mexico Ingles Airplay (Billboard)	46
Portugal Digital Song Sales (Billboard)	6
Scottish Singles Sales (Official Charts)	18
Slovakia Airplay (ČNS IFPI)	46
Spain (Promusicae)	40
Sweden (Sverigetopplistan)	36
Switzerland (Schweizer Hitparade)	38
UK Singles (Official Charts)	23
US Billboard Hot 100	15
US Hot Rock & Alternative Songs (Billboard)	3
US Rock & Alternative Airplay (Billboard)	4
US Adult Contemporary (Billboard)	22
US Adult Pop Airplay (Billboard)	8
US Dance Airplay (Billboard)	18
US Pop Airplay (Billboard)	10

=== Year-end charts ===
2012 year-end chart performance for "It's Time"
Chart (2012)	Position
US Billboard Hot 100	91
US Hot Rock Songs (Billboard)	9

2013 year-end chart performance for "It's Time"
Chart (2013)	Position
Austria (Ö3 Austria Top 40)	63
Canada (Canadian Hot 100)	88
UK Singles (Official Charts Company)	137
US Billboard Hot 100	47
US Hot Rock Songs (Billboard)	6
US Rock Airplay (Billboard)	22
US Adult Top 40 (Billboard)	28
US Mainstream Top 40 (Billboard)	45

=== Decade-end charts ===
Decade-end chart performance for "It's Time"
Chart (2010–2019)	Position
US Hot Rock Songs (Billboard)	20

== Certifications ==
Certifications and sales for "It's Time"
Region	Certification	Certified units/sales
Australia (ARIA)	2× Platinum	140,000^{^}
Austria (IFPI Austria)	Gold	15,000^{*}
Brazil (Pro-Música Brasil)	Diamond	250,000^{‡}
Canada (Music Canada)	3× Platinum	240,000^{‡}
Germany (BVMI)	Platinum	300,000^{‡}
Italy (FIMI)	Platinum	50,000^{‡}
Mexico (AMPROFON)	Gold	30,000^{*}
New Zealand (RMNZ)	2× Platinum	60,000^{‡}
Spain (Promusicae)	Platinum	60,000^{‡}
Sweden (GLF)	Platinum	40,000^{‡}
Switzerland (IFPI Switzerland)	Gold	15,000^{^}
United Kingdom (BPI)	Platinum	600,000^{‡}
United States (RIAA)	7× Platinum	7,000,000^{‡}
Streaming
Denmark (IFPI Danmark)	Platinum	1,800,000^{†}
^{*} Sales figures based on certification alone.^{^} Shipments figures based on certification alone.^{‡} Sales+streaming figures based on certification alone.^{†} Streaming-only figures based on certification alone.

== Accolades ==
Year	Ceremony	Award	Result
2012	MTV Video Music Awards	Best Rock Video	Nominated

Publication	Country	Accolade	Year	Rank
Z100	United States	Most Played Tracks of 2013	2013	9

== Release history ==
Release dates for "It's Time"
Country	Date	Format	Label
United States	February 6, 2012	Submodern rock radio	Interscope Records
United States	February 20, 2012	Modern rock radio	Interscope Records
Canada	September 2, 2012	Digital download (Cherry Cherry Boom Boom remix)	Interscope Records; KIDinaKORNER
United States	September 2, 2012	Digital download (Cherry Cherry Boom Boom remix)	Interscope Records; KIDinaKORNER
United States	September 18, 2012	Contemporary hit radio	Interscope Records
Canada	October 2, 2012	Digital download (Passion Pit remix)	Interscope Records; KIDinaKORNER
United States	October 2, 2012	Digital download (Passion Pit remix)	Interscope Records; KIDinaKORNER
Australia	November 9, 2012	Digital download	Interscope Records; KIDinaKORNER
Brazil	November 9, 2012	Digital download	Interscope Records; KIDinaKORNER
France	November 9, 2012	Digital download	Interscope Records; KIDinaKORNER
Italy	November 9, 2012	Digital download	Interscope Records; KIDinaKORNER
New Zealand	November 9, 2012	Digital download	Interscope Records; KIDinaKORNER
Philippines	November 9, 2012	Digital download	Interscope Records; KIDinaKORNER
Russia	November 9, 2012	Digital download	Interscope Records; KIDinaKORNER
South Africa	November 9, 2012	Digital download	Interscope Records; KIDinaKORNER
Spain	November 9, 2012	Digital download	Interscope Records; KIDinaKORNER
Switzerland	November 9, 2012	Digital download	Interscope Records; KIDinaKORNER
Mexico	November 13, 2012	Digital download	Interscope Records; KIDinaKORNER
Germany	December 7, 2012	Digital download	Interscope Records; KIDinaKORNER
Italy	January 11, 2013	Contemporary hit radio	Universal Music
United Kingdom	August 2, 2013	Digital download	Interscope Records; KIDinaKORNER
