= Night Visions =

2012 studio album by Imagine Dragons

Studio album by Imagine Dragons
- Released: September 4, 2012
- Recorded: Late 2009 – July 2012
- Studios: Studio at the Palms (Paradise, Nevada); Battle Born (Winchester, Nevada); Westlake (Los Angeles, California)
- Genre: Pop rock
- Length: 43:51
- Labels: Interscope; Kidinakorner
- Producers: Alex da Kid; Brandon Darner; Imagine Dragons

Imagine Dragons chronology
Continued Silence (2012)	Night Visions (2012)	Hear Me (2012)

Singles from Night Visions
- 1. "It's Time" Released: February 6, 2012; 2. "Radioactive" Released: October 29, 2012; 3. "Hear Me" Released: November 24, 2012; 4. "Demons" Released: January 28, 2013; 5. "On Top of the World" Released: March 18, 2013

Night Visions is the debut studio album by the American pop rock band Imagine Dragons. It was released on September 4, 2012, through Kidinakorner and Interscope Records. The album was primarily produced by the band themselves, as well as English hip-hop producer Alex da Kid and Brandon Darner of The Envy Corps and formerly of the metal band Slipknot. According to frontman Dan Reynolds, the album took three years to finish, with six of the album's tracks being previously released on multiple EPs. Musically, Night Visions exhibits influences of folk, hip hop and pop.

The album debuted at number two on the Billboard 200 in the United States, selling more than 83,000 copies within its first week where it has since been certified octuple platinum. It also peaked at the summit of the Billboard Alternative Albums and Rock Albums charts, as well as in the top ten albums in Australia, Austria, Canada, Germany, Ireland, Mexico, Netherlands, New Zealand, Norway, Portugal, Sweden, Switzerland, and United Kingdom. Night Visions appeared in the Billboard 200 top 10 in 2012, 2013, and 2014. The album became the fourth best-selling album of 2013 in the US. It was nominated for the Juno Award for International Album of the Year (2014) and won the Billboard Music Award for Top Rock Album (2014).

The band released a ten-year anniversary expanded edition of Night Visions on September 9, 2022, featuring two previously unreleased demos, "Love of Mine" and "Bubble". "Love of Mine" was released on September 2.

== Background ==
In 2008, lead singer Dan Reynolds formed the band Imagine Dragons; soon, guitarist Wayne Sermon, bassist Ben McKee, drummer Andrew Tolman, and keyboardist Brittany Tolman joined, replacing founding members Andrew Beck, Dave Lemke, and Aurora Florence. Each of the members moved to Las Vegas, Nevada.

After playing in numerous local Battle of the Bands competitions, the band recorded and released three extended plays: 2009's Imagine Dragons, 2010's Hell and Silence, and 2011's It's Time. Andrew and Brittany Tolman left the band in July 2011 and were subsequently replaced with drummer Daniel Platzman that August. The band was picked up by Universal Records and was signed to Interscope in November 2011.

In 2011, the band entered the studio to write and record their major-label debut extended play, Continued Silence, and additional material for a debut studio album. Continued Silence was released on February 14, 2012, and was met with critical acclaim, reaching at number 40 on the US Billboard 200.

== Promotion ==
=== Singles ===
"It's Time", which first appeared on the band's 2011 EP of the same name, was sent to mainstream radio in January 2012, and was released as the band's debut single on August 18, 2012. The song peaked at No. 15 on the Billboard Hot 100. The band performed the song on The Tonight Show with Jay Leno, Jimmy Kimmel Live!, Late Night with Jimmy Fallon, and Conan.

"Radioactive" was released as a radio-only single from Continued Silence and Night Visions in April and October 2012 respectively. The band performed the song on Jimmy Kimmel Live!, The Late Show with David Letterman, The Tonight Show with Jay Leno, Late Night with Jimmy Fallon, and Saturday Night Live. It reached at number 3 on the US Billboard Hot 100, as well as number 1 on the Alternative Songs chart and Hot Rock Songs chart.

"Hear Me" was released as a single on November 24, 2012. The following day, the song was released as part of a 4-track EP.

"Demons" was released to American Triple A radio on January 28, 2013, as a radio-only single. It reached at number 6 on the US Billboard Hot 100, as well as number 1 on the Pop Songs chart.

"On Top of the World" was released as the album's fifth and final single on March 18, 2013. It peaked at No. 79 in the US. It was previously released as a promotional single in the Netherlands in late 2012.

=== Promotional singles ===
"Amsterdam" was exclusively released as a free download via iTunes. The single was released as iTunes' "Single of the Week" on the week of the album's release in countries with respective release dates of the album.

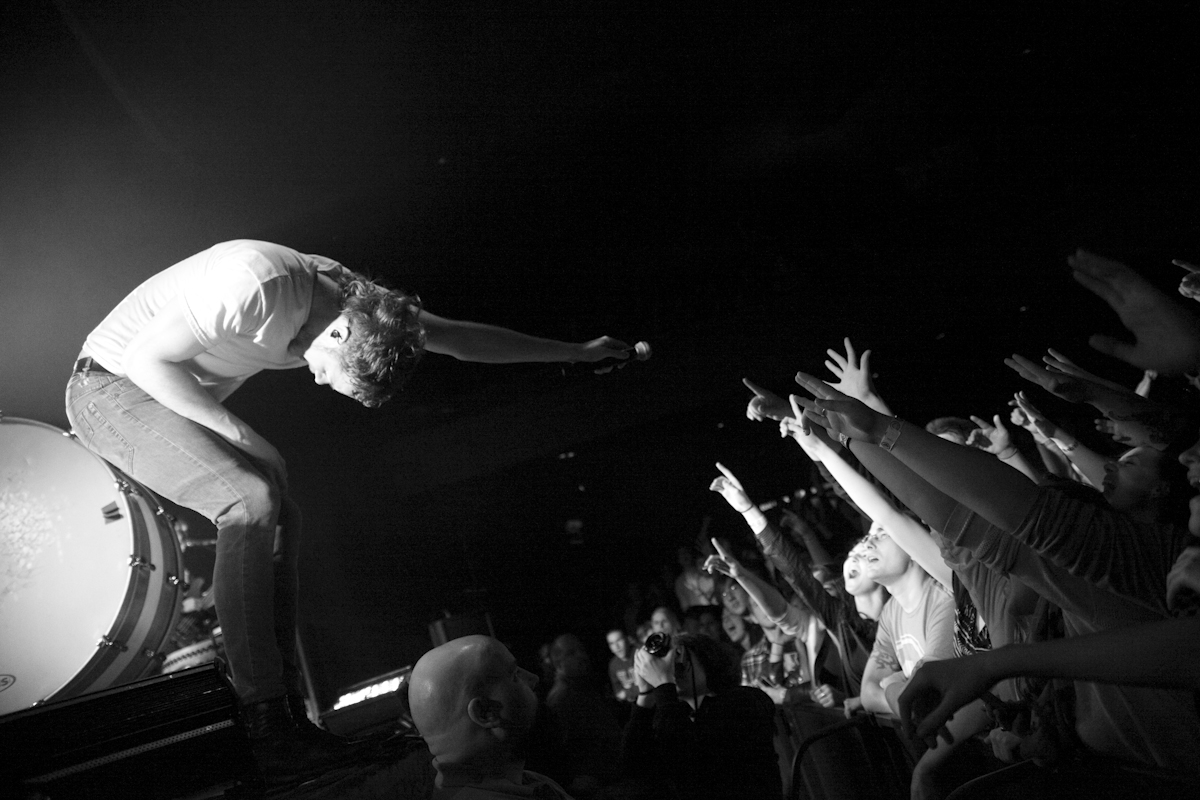
Imagine Dragons performing "Radioactive" at The Pageant on March 6, 2013, as part of the 145-date Night Visions Tour.

=== Tour ===
The band embarked on a 40 date fall tour to promote Night Visions. They performed as the opening act for Awolnation, and traveled across the United States in the fall of 2012 to promote the album's initial release in North America. During the tour, the band appeared on the September 4, 2012, airing of ABC late-night talk show Jimmy Kimmel Live!. They also made an appearance on the October 29, 2012 airing of NBC late-night talk show Late Night with Jimmy Fallon performing "It's Time" to an empty audience during Hurricane Sandy's passage through the New York / New Jersey metropolitan area during that weekend.

In 2013, a world tour, entitled the Night Visions Tour, was executed in promotion of the worldwide release of Night Visions. Starting in February 2013, the 145-date tour saw the band perform across North America and Europe. During the tour, the band made their first national television appearance, performing "Radioactive" on the February 22, 2013, airing of CBS late-night talk show Late Show with David Letterman. The band performed in front of cameras during their appearance at the 2013 Isle of Wight Festival for Vevo's Summer Six series. The band made another television appearance in the United States, performing "Radioactive", "Demons" and "On Top of the World" on the July 4, 2013, airing of ABC morning television show Good Morning America.

== Critical reception ==
Professional ratings
Aggregate scores
Source	Rating
Metacritic	53/100
Review scores
Source	Rating
AllMusic	4/5 stars
Consequence of Sound	2.5/5 stars
CraveOnline	8/10
Las Vegas Weekly	3.5/5 stars
Melodic	4/5 stars
musicOMH	2/5 stars
Q	2/5 stars
Sputnikmusic	2.5/5
USA Today	3/4 stars

At Metacritic, which assigns a normalized rating out of 100 to reviews from mainstream critics, the album received a score of 52, based on 6 reviews, which indicates "mixed or average reviews". Brian Mansfield from USA Today gave Night Visions a favorable review, writing: "For all the group's musical mastery, it's the flourishes courtesy of producer Alex da Kid that make individual tracks stand out." Mansfield praised individual elements such as "the mandolin hook of 'It's Time', the jaunty whistle of 'On Top of the World', [and] the burbling guitar in 'Demons.'" and said that "those creative touches may seem like small details, but it's that imagination that gives these Dragons teeth." Gregory Heaney of AllMusic remarked that the album "sometimes feels as though it lacks depth", but nonetheless called it "an album that, at least for a few minutes at a time, will make everyday life seem just a little bit bigger".

Annie Zaleski of Las Vegas Weekly praised Night Visions for being "well-crafted and wildly creative, and boasts solid songwriting—three things that are sorely missing on albums by so many younger bands." Lisa Kwon of Consequence of Sound gave the album a mixed review and felt that Night Visions "fails to match the fresh adrenaline rush that the band's first single had promised us when we first heard it on the radio or in commercials earlier this year." Johan Wippsson from Melodic magazine called Night Visions "somewhat shattered, but as a whole this is a very charming and well-crafted album." Chris Saunders of musicOMH panned the album as "so safe and middle of the road that it leaves you with the same hollow feeling that Las Vegas can, without the dizzying high and sensual assault that got you there in the first place."

== Commercial performance ==
The album debuted at number two on the Billboard 200 in the United States, selling more than 83,000 copies within its first week. It also peaked at the summit of the Billboard Alternative Albums chart and Rock Albums chart. It has appeared in the top ten albums on the Billboard 200 in 2012, 2013 and 2014 (as well as topping the Alternative Albums chart in each of those years) and has not fallen off the chart once as of February 25, 2015. The album debuted at number two in the United Kingdom, narrowly losing the top slot to Justin Timberlake's The 20/20 Experience. As of 2 December 2024, the album has received an 8× platinum certification in the United States by the Recording Industry Association of America (RIAA), for certified sales of 8 million units in the country alone.

The album was the fourth best-selling album in the US in 2013 with over 1.4 million copies sold for the year. As of February 2015, it had sold a total of 2.5 million copies in the US and earned double Platinum status. It was also the third best-selling album in Canada with 179,000 copies sold.

To date, three singles from the album charted in the Billboard Top 20, and five have charted on the UK Top 40. In the US, "It's Time" has sold more than 2 million copies in the United States, "Radioactive" has sold more than 10 million and "Demons" has sold more than 5 million. Both "Radioactive" and "Demons" spent more than 60 weeks on the Billboard Hot 100, making Imagine Dragons the first artist to accomplish such a feat.

== Track listing ==
All tracks are written by Dan Reynolds, Wayne Sermon, and Ben McKee, except where noted.

Standard edition
No.	Title	Writer(s)	Producer(s)	Length
1.	"Radioactive"	Reynolds; Sermon; McKee; Alexander Grant; Josh Mosser	Alex da Kid	3:07
2.	"Tiptoe"		Imagine Dragons	3:14
3.	"It's Time"		Brandon Darner; Imagine Dragons	4:00
4.	"Demons"	Reynolds; Sermon; McKee; Grant; Mosser	Alex da Kid	2:58
5.	"On Top of the World"	Reynolds; Sermon; McKee; Grant	Imagine Dragons; Alex da Kid	3:12
6.	"Amsterdam"		Darner; Imagine Dragons	4:01
7.	"Hear Me"		Imagine Dragons	3:55
8.	"Every Night"		Imagine Dragons	3:37
9.	"Bleeding Out"	Reynolds; Sermon; McKee; Grant; Mosser	Alex da Kid	3:43
10.	"Underdog"		Imagine Dragons	3:29
11.	"Nothing Left to Say" (6:48)/"Rocks" (2:12)		Imagine Dragons	9:00

2013 release
No.	Title	Writer(s)	Producer(s)	Length
12.	"Cha-Ching (Till We Grow Older)"	Reynolds; Sermon; McKee; Clint Holgate	Imagine Dragons	4:09
13.	"Working Man"		Imagine Dragons	3:55
Total length:				51:55

iTunes bonus tracks
No.	Title	Producer(s)	Length
12.	"Working Man"	Imagine Dragons	3:55
13.	"Fallen"	Imagine Dragons	2:59
Total length:			50:43

Spotify bonus tracks
No.	Title	Writer(s)	Producer(s)	Length
12.	"Cha-Ching (Till We Grow Older)"	Reynolds; Sermon; McKee; Holgate	Imagine Dragons	4:09
13.	"Working Man"		Imagine Dragons	3:55
14.	"Tokyo"		Darner; Imagine Dragons	3:16
Total length:				55:09

Best Buy bonus tracks
No.	Title	Producer(s)	Length
12.	"Selene"	Imagine Dragons	4:02
13.	"The River"	Darner; Imagine Dragons	3:25
Total length:			51:17

Target bonus tracks
No.	Title	Writer(s)	Producer(s)	Length
12.	"My Fault"	Reynolds; Sermon; McKee; Grant	Imagine Dragons; Alex da Kid	2:57
13.	"Round and Round"	Reynolds; Sermon; McKee; Grant	Imagine Dragons; Alex da Kid	3:18
14.	"The River"		Darner; Imagine Dragons	3:25
15.	"America"		Imagine Dragons	4:33
16.	"Selene"		Imagine Dragons	4:02
17.	"Cover Up"		Imagine Dragons	4:20
18.	"I Don't Mind"		Imagine Dragons	3:18
Total length:				69:43

North American deluxe edition
No.	Title	Writer(s)	Producer(s)	Length
12.	"My Fault"	Reynolds; Sermon; McKee; Grant	Imagine Dragons; Alex da Kid	2:57
13.	"Round and Round"	Reynolds; Sermon; McKee; Grant	Imagine Dragons; Alex da Kid	3:18
14.	"The River"		Darner; Imagine Dragons	3:25
15.	"America"		Imagine Dragons	4:34
16.	"Selene"		Imagine Dragons	4:02
Total length:				62:06

Expanded Edition Disc 2
No.	Title	Writer(s)	Producer(s)	Length
12.	"Cha-Ching (Till We Grow Older)"	Reynolds; Sermon; McKee; Holgate	Imagine Dragons	4:09
13.	"Working Man"		Imagine Dragons	3:55
14.	"My Fault"	Reynolds; Sermon; McKee; Grant	Imagine Dragons; Alex da Kid	2:57
15.	"Round and Round"	Reynolds; Sermon; McKee; Grant	Imagine Dragons; Alex da Kid	3:18
16.	"The River"		Darner; Imagine Dragons	3:25
17.	"America"		Imagine Dragons	4:33
18.	"Selene"		Imagine Dragons	4:02
19.	"Fallen"		Imagine Dragons	2:59
20.	"Cover Up"		Imagine Dragons	4:20
21.	"Love of Mine"	Reynolds; Sermon	Imagine Dragons	4:10
22.	"Bubble"	Reynolds; Sermon	Imagine Dragons	3:23
Total length:				89:21

10th anniversary expanded super deluxe edition
No.	Title	Writer(s)	Producer(s)	Length
1.	"Cha-Ching (Till We Grow Older)"	Reynolds; Sermon; McKee; Holgate	Imagine Dragons	4:09
2.	"Working Man"		Imagine Dragons	3:55
3.	"My Fault"	Reynolds; Sermon; McKee; Grant	Imagine Dragons; Alex da Kid	2:57
4.	"Round and Round"	Reynolds; Sermon; McKee; Grant	Imagine Dragons; Alex da Kid	3:17
5.	"The River"		Darner; Imagine Dragons	3:25
6.	"America"		Imagine Dragons	4:33
7.	"Selene"		Imagine Dragons	4:02
8.	"Fallen"		Imagine Dragons	2:59
9.	"Cover Up"		Imagine Dragons	4:20
10.	"I Don't Mind"			3:18
11.	"Tokyo"		Darner; Imagine Dragons	3:16
12.	"Love of Mine" (demo)	Reynolds; Sermon		4:10
13.	"Bubble" (demo)	Reynolds; Sermon		3:23
Total length:				109:50

== Personnel ==
All credits are adapted from the liner notes of Night Visions. All bonus track credits are listed in the track order of the 10th Anniversary reissue.

Imagine Dragons

- Dan Reynolds – lead vocals
- Wayne Sermon – electric and acoustic guitars; mandolin (tracks 3 & 11); backing vocals
- Ben McKee – bass guitar (all); synths programing (tracks 1 & 2); backing vocals
- Daniel Platzman – drums (except 3, 6 & 7); drum machine (all); viola; backing vocals

Additional musicians

- Andrew Tolman – drums (disc 1: tracks 3, 6, 7; disc 2: tracks 5, 6, 7, 9, 10, 11)
- Brittany Tolman – keyboards, backing vocals (disc 1: tracks 3, 6, 7; disc 2: tracks 5, 6, 7, 9, 10, 11)
- J Browz – additional guitar (tracks 1 and 4), additional bass (track 4)
- Jonathan Vears – additional guitar (track 9)
- Benjamin Maughan – additional piano, additional bass

Production

- Alex Da Kid – executive production; production, songwriting (tracks 1, 4, 5, 9); mixing (track 9)
- Josh Mosser – production, songwriting (tracks 1, 4, 9); additional engineering (tracks 2, 3, 5, 8–11); recording (tracks 1 & 9); mixing (tracks 7 & 9)
- Brandon Darner – production (tracks 3, 6; disc 2: tracks 5 & 11)
- Manny Marroquin – mixing (tracks 1, 4, 5; disc 2: tracks 4 & 5)
- Mark Needham – mixing, engineering, recording (2, 3, 6, 11; disc 2: tracks 5, 12 & 13)
- Will Brierre – assistant mix engineering (tracks 2, 3, 6, 8, 9, 11; disc 2: tracks 1 & 2)
- Mark Everton Gray – engineering, recording (tracks 3 & 6; disc 2: tracks 5 & 11)
- Robert Root – engineering, recording (track 7; disc 2: tracks 7–10)
- Charlie Stavish – engineering (track 5; disc 2 tracks 4 & 5)
- Rob Katz – assistant engineering (tracks 1, 10, 11; disc 2: track 2)
- Joe LaPorta – mastering (all)
- GraphicTherapy – art direction & design
- Evgenij Soloview Appachennov – album cover art
- Harper Smith – photography
- Mac Reynolds – management
- Robert Reynolds – legal
- Adam Brill – booking
- James Whitting – U.K. / Europe booking
- Hilary Siskind – press
- Randy Merrill – mastering (disc 2: tracks 12 & 13)
- Matt Cropper – mixing (disc 3: tracks 1–3)
- Christopher Heller – mixing (disc 3: tracks 4–11)
- Keith Megna – mixing (disc 3: tracks 4–11)
- Duncan Rice – production (disc 3: tracks 12–14); film director (disc 3: tracks 12 & 13)
- Keith Vanburgen – recording engineering (disc 3: tracks 12–14)

== Charts ==
=== Weekly charts ===
Chart (2012–2025)	Peak position
Australian Albums (ARIA)	4
Austrian Albums (Ö3 Austria)	8
Belgian Albums (Ultratop Flanders)	31
Belgian Albums (Ultratop Wallonia)	25
Canadian Albums (Billboard)	3
Danish Albums (Hitlisten)	22
Dutch Albums (Album Top 100)	3
Finnish Albums (Suomen virallinen lista)	24
French Albums (SNEP)	15
German Albums (Offizielle Top 100)	6
Hungarian Albums (MAHASZ)	14
Irish Albums (IRMA)	3
Irish Albums (Official Charts)	49
Italian Albums (FIMI)	18
Mexican Albums (AMPROFON)	3
New Zealand Albums (RMNZ)	5
Norwegian Albums (VG-lista)	3
Polish Albums (ZPAV)	27
Portuguese Albums (AFP)	5
Scottish Albums (Official Charts)	1
South African Albums (RISA)	17
Spanish Albums (Promusicae)	19
Swedish Albums (Sverigetopplistan)	7
Swiss Albums (Schweizer Hitparade)	9
UK Albums (Official Charts)	2
US Billboard 200	2
US Top Alternative Albums (Billboard)	1
US Top Catalog Albums (Billboard)	1
US Top Rock Albums (Billboard)	1

=== Year-end charts ===
Chart (2012)	Position
US Billboard 200	133
US Top Alternative Albums (Billboard)	21
US Top Rock Albums (Billboard)	36

Chart (2013)	Position
Australian Albums (ARIA)	21
Austrian Albums (Ö3 Austria)	36
Belgian Albums (Ultratop Flanders)	121
Belgian Albums (Ultratop Wallonia)	178
Canadian Albums (Billboard)	5
French Albums (SNEP)	160
German Albums (Offizielle Top 100)	44
Mexican Albums (AMPROFON)	74
Spain (PROMUSICAE)	49
Swedish Albums (Sverigetopplistan)	56
Swiss Albums (Schweizer Hitparade)	48
UK Albums (OCC)	32
US Billboard 200	6
US Top Alternative Albums (Billboard)	2
US Top Rock Albums (Billboard)	2

Chart (2014)	Position
Australian Albums (ARIA)	32
Austrian Albums (Ö3 Austria)	50
Belgian Albums (Ultratop Flanders)	159
Belgian Albums (Ultratop Wallonia)	130
Canadian Albums (Billboard)	13
Dutch Albums (Album Top 100)	48
French Albums (SNEP)	40
Italian Albums (FIMI)	57
Mexican Albums (AMPROFON)	23
New Zealand (Recorded Music NZ)	27
Swedish Albums (Sverigetopplistan)	14
Swiss Albums (Schweizer Hitparade)	42
UK Albums (OCC)	38
US Billboard 200	12
US Top Alternative Albums (Billboard)	2
US Top Rock Albums (Billboard)	2

Chart (2015)	Position
Mexican Albums (AMPROFON)	78
Swedish Albums (Sverigetopplistan)	50
UK Albums (OCC)	87
US Billboard 200	47
US Top Catalog Albums (Billboard)	3

Chart (2016)	Position
Danish Albums (Hitlisten)	99
US Billboard 200	109

Chart (2017)	Position
US Billboard 200	113
US Top Rock Albums (Billboard)	13

Chart (2018)	Position
US Billboard 200	71
US Top Rock Albums (Billboard)	4

Chart (2019)	Position
Belgian Albums (Ultratop Flanders)	184
US Billboard 200	103
US Top Rock Albums (Billboard)	17

Chart (2020)	Position
Belgian Albums (Ultratop Flanders)	144
US Billboard 200	185
US Top Rock Albums (Billboard)	21

Chart (2021)	Position
Belgian Albums (Ultratop Flanders)	85
Belgian Albums (Ultratop Wallonia)	183

Chart (2022)	Position
Belgian Albums (Ultratop Flanders)	88
Belgian Albums (Ultratop Wallonia)	139
Dutch Albums (Album Top 100)	71

Chart (2023)	Position
Belgian Albums (Ultratop Flanders)	92
Belgian Albums (Ultratop Wallonia)	147
Dutch Albums (Album Top 100)	58
Hungarian Albums (MAHASZ)	90
Swedish Albums (Sverigetopplistan)	83

Chart (2024)	Position
Belgian Albums (Ultratop Flanders)	83
Belgian Albums (Ultratop Wallonia)	129
Dutch Albums (Album Top 100)	67
Hungarian Albums (MAHASZ)	80

Chart (2025)	Position
Belgian Albums (Ultratop Flanders)	100
Belgian Albums (Ultratop Wallonia)	139

=== Decade-end charts ===
Chart (2010–2019)	Position
US Billboard 200	7
US Top Rock Albums (Billboard)	3

=== 21st century charts ===
Chart (2000–2025)	Position
US Billboard 200	27

=== All-time charts ===
Chart (1958–2015)	Position
US Billboard 200	37

== Certifications ==
Region	Certification	Certified units/sales
Australia (ARIA)	Platinum	70,000^{^}
Austria (IFPI Austria)	2× Platinum	30,000^{*}
Belgium (BRMA)	2× Platinum	60,000^{‡}
Brazil (Pro-Música Brasil)	Gold	20,000^{*}
Canada (Music Canada)	7× Platinum	560,000^{‡}
Denmark (IFPI Danmark)	3× Platinum	60,000^{‡}
France (SNEP)	Platinum	100,000^{*}
Germany (BVMI)	3× Gold	300,000^{‡}
Italy (FIMI)	3× Platinum	150,000^{‡}
Mexico (AMPROFON)	Diamond+3× Platinum	480,000^{‡}
Netherlands (NVPI)	Platinum	50,000^{^}
New Zealand (RMNZ)	5× Platinum	75,000^{‡}
Poland (ZPAV)	Platinum	20,000^{*}
Portugal (AFP)	Platinum	15,000^{^}
Singapore (RIAS)	Platinum	10,000^{*}
Spain (Promusicae)	Gold	20,000^{^}
Sweden (GLF)	2× Platinum	80,000^{‡}
Switzerland (IFPI Switzerland)	Platinum	30,000^{^}
United Kingdom (BPI)	3× Platinum	900,000^{‡}
United States (RIAA)	8× Platinum	8,000,000^{‡}
^{*} Sales figures based on certification alone.^{^} Shipments figures based on certification alone.^{‡} Sales+streaming figures based on certification alone.

== Accolades ==
Awards
Year	Ceremony	Award	Result
2014	Billboard Music Awards	Top Rock Album	Won
2014	Juno Awards	International Album of the Year	Nominated

Accolades
Publication	Country	Accolade	Year	Rank
Spotify	United States	Most Streamed Albums (U.S.)	2013	1
Spotify	United Kingdom	Most Streamed Albums (UK)	2013	3
Rdio	Worldwide	Top Global Albums	2013	6
RIAA	United States	Biggest Selling Albums of 2013 (U.S.)	2013	4
MC	Canada	Biggest Selling Albums of 2013 (CAN)	2013	3
BPI	United Kingdom	Biggest Selling Albums of 2013 (UK)	2013	32

== Release history ==
Region	Date	Format	Label
Canada	September 4, 2012	CD; Digital download	Interscope Records; KIDinaKORNER
Mexico	September 4, 2012	CD; Digital download	Interscope Records; KIDinaKORNER
United States	September 4, 2012	CD; Digital download	Interscope Records; KIDinaKORNER
Australia	September 7, 2012	CD; Digital download	Interscope Records
New Zealand	September 7, 2012	CD; Digital download	Interscope Records
Germany	February 1, 2013	CD; Digital download	Interscope Records
Netherlands	February 1, 2013	CD; Digital download	Interscope Records
India	February 1, 2013	CD; Digital download	Interscope Records
Brazil	February 1, 2013	CD; Digital download	Interscope Records
Denmark	February 1, 2013	CD; Digital download	Interscope Records
France	February 1, 2013	CD; Digital download	Interscope Records
Italy	February 1, 2013	CD; Digital download	Interscope Records
Russia	February 1, 2013	CD; Digital download	Interscope Records
South Africa	February 1, 2013	CD; Digital download	Interscope Records
Spain	February 1, 2013	CD; Digital download	Interscope Records
Switzerland	February 1, 2013	CD; Digital download	Interscope Records
United Kingdom	March 31, 2013	CD; Digital download	Interscope Records
Ireland	March 31, 2013	CD; Digital download	Interscope Records
China	April 30, 2013	CD	Universal Music Group
Deluxe edition
Australia	February 1, 2013	Digital download	Interscope Records
New Zealand	February 1, 2013	Digital download	Interscope Records
United States	February 12, 2013	Digital download	Interscope Records; KIDinaKORNER
United Kingdom	April 19, 2013	CD; Digital download	Interscope Records
Australia (Second Issue)	September 27, 2013	Digital download	Interscope Records
New Zealand (Second Issue)	September 27, 2013	Digital download	Interscope Records
