= Rock Mot Rus =

Norwegian rock festival

- Genre: Rock; Heavy metal
- Begins: April 19, 2027
- Ends: April 21, 2027
- Frequency: Annually
- Locations: Andenes, Norway
- Inaugurated: December 17, 1983
- Most recent: March 28, 2026
- Prize money: 20,000 NOK
- Website: rockmotrus.no

Rock Mot Rus (transl. Rock against drugs) is a rock festival hosted in Andenes, Norway. The festival has been hosted since 1983, making it the oldest still running rock festival in Norway.

Rock Mot Rus was most recently held across 2 days, a Friday and a Saturday. Friday and Saturday afternoon are both used for concerts for the headliners, while midnight on Saturday is used for a contest where smaller youth bands perform, and a winner was declared Saturday evening. The prize for winning the contest is 20,000 Norwegian kroner and the opportunity to be a headliner at the next Rock Mot Rus.

== Lineup ==
Headliners (in bold) are not part of the contest. Before 2001 there were two classes, open class and Andøy-class. The Andøy-class was discontinued in 2000.

Year	Band	Winner
2026	**Arachno, Michelle Ullestad, LÜT, Kickslip, Victoria Havn, Aliens, Regnvær, TAUS, Feral Nature, Beathoven**, Deprived, Skøll, Homo Erectus, Golinski, Night Fret, Birk and the babes, Arvelaus, Angar, Bamse Bjørn og de urolige, Kontrollerte Anfall, Kabel, Innhåldsførrtægnelse, Hells Abels, Innriss, Raumabandet, Unknown, Pax Mongolica, Pappa, Granstokkan, Jam Sesh, 3.5 Norsk, Posing Woods, Reverie, Jernmalm, Firsprang, Biocide, The Internationals, Bloodborn, Cepsis	Deprived
2025	**KAOS, Sirkus Eliassen, Elle Maija, Agabas, Vilde Bye, Tolou, Rosa Faenskap, Erika Norwich, Cupid Girl**, Barnevænnlig, Tunnelsyn, Vanderskogs, Golinski, Bloodborn, Innriss, Kabel, Tøsferatu, Harstad FHS, Innholdsfortegnelse, Alexandra, Angar, Mathiesen, Backstage Boys, Viktoria Havn, Raumabandet, Husstrid, Rods of God, Blackbirds	Victoria Havn
2024	**Slomosa, RSP & Thomax, Han Herman, Dead Movie Animals, Yesterdaze, Defusion, Reaping Flesh, Run Dry, Kickslip, Mio, Skaar,** Victoria Havn, KAOS (list not complete)	KAOS
2023	Posing Woods, Feeling B, One Dollar Taco, Isabel & the Shrimpdogs, The Hookers, Barrikade, Skøll, Defusion, Brusk, Strømbrudd, Nameless, Blackbirds, Bølge, The Hookers	Defusion
2022	**Tungtvann, Honningbarna, RSP & Thomax, Superlynx**, Veps, Cult Member, Bærtur, Posing Woods, Perfect Wave, Girltalk, Julian Audy, Barnevænnlig, Blackbirds, Ellery Daines, MerkD, Vannspreder, HOMO, Kulturskolebandet, Planet Remina, Watto, Barrikade, Wenche Fuzz	Barnevænnlig
2021	**PomPoko**, Julian Audy, Vilde Bye, Desert State of Mind, Hedda Mae, Ask Carol, Musti, Cult Member, HOMO	HOMO
2020	Desert State of Mind, NorthKid, Bokassa, Deathcult, Triosphere, Inge Bremnes, Eira Meland, Golden Core, Regnvær, Sara & Arash, A Million Pineapples, Slutface, It Might Get Loud	Desert State of Mind
2019	**ISÁK, Bokassa, Razika, Golden Core, RSP, RSP & Thomax**, Halie, Viljar Broks, NorthKid, Foad Noor, De Marvells, Kryp	Kryp
2018	**Sondre Justad, Frank Carter & The Rattlesnakes, Blood Command, Jesper Jenset,** Ondt Blod, KUUK, Lyse Netter, It Might Get Loud, Neon Apartments, Olesya Burtseva, The Irrelevants, Regnvær	Regnvær
2017	**Karpe Diem**, **Cezinando, Triosphere, Sløtface, Kajander,** Endolith, Virkelig, Hellflower, Hubro, 10th Harmonic	10th Harmonic
2016	**Joddski, El Caco, Morgan Sulele, Dagny, LÜT,** Awesomnia, Hubro, Sara & Arash, Kriminell Kunst, Snö, Carnival Kids, Ohmwork	Hubro
2015	**Donkeyboy, Kakkmaddafakka, Sondre Justad, Izabell, Adept,** Kaveh, Lamark, Vederkast, Resirkulert, Dudes, Blomst, Bloodlights, Approaching Pluto, Heave Blood & Die	Heave Blood & Die
2014	**Kvelertak, Moddi, Team Me, Audrey Horne, Arif, Beaten to Death, RSP, Store P, Poppa Lars, Oh!,** Approaching Pluto, Ondt Blod, The Wolves, Carnival, Nealspring	Approaching Pluto
2013	**Admiral P**, **A-laget, Black Debbath, Blood Command, Oslo Ess, Sirkus Eliassen,** Cazadores, Feskekrok, Honeytraps, Taliban Airways, The Hex, The Wolves	The Wolves
2012	**Satyricon**, **LidoLido, Kråkesølv, Insense, Vidar Vang, Violet Road, Sirkus Eliassen,** Acid Garden, Die A Legend, Hålogalandslaget, Jabba The Butt, Pistol & Bart, Pravus, Feskekrok	Feskekrok
2011	**Gallows**, **Kvelertak, Datarock, Honningbarna, Moddi, RSP, Magnus Eliassen,** Surfers Lingo, Vishnu, Kollwitz, Dagny Nordvoll Sandvik, Oter, Betablok, Pravus, Prospect, New Generation, End of Carnage, Ingeborg Oktober, Kamikaze a go go, Woldie, Pistolkrutt Yo!, Confero, Captain Obvious, Black Flames, Alerion, Red Revolution, Poppa Lars/Oter/Klisne Fingra, Feskekrok, Dark Blue Depths, Glitch, Halcyon Days, New Fashion, RSP & Thomax, Heavy Ducks, Jabba The Butt	Jabba The Butt
2010	**Joddski, Robin & Bugge, Cyaneed, Jaa9 & OnklP, Turdus Musicus, Kråkesølv, Moddi, Dead by April, Purified In Blood,** Kalde Tåra, Tookoo, Prospect, Erratum, Betablok	Betablok
2009	**Joddski, Karpe Diem, The BlackSheeps, Kompani 69, Skambankt,** Sanity Shed	Sanity Shed
2008	**Dimmu Borgir, El Caco, Insense, Inglow, Yoga Fire, Blood Tsunami, Erik og Kriss, Stella Mwangi, Quiritatio,** Bjørn-Ingars, Type Vicious, Taliban Airways, Surfers Lingo	Surfers Lingo
2007	**Tungtvann, Vidar Vang, My Midnight Creeps, Vanskapt, Turdus Musicus, Magnus Eliassen, Quiritatio, Senit,** Taliban Airways, Rocketboyz, Tim, Desert Highway, Torch, Moddi	Moddi
2006	**Maria Mena, Stonegard, Surferosa, Animal Alpha, Rex Rudi,** Torch, Revolt, Desert Highway	Desert Highway
2005	**Entombed, Stonegard, Gåte, Tungtvann, Gatas Parlament, El Caco,** Jack, Lites, Rocketboyz, Taliban Airways, Revolt, Flamethrower	Flamethrower
2004	**David Pedersen**, Insense, Dominic, Turdus Musicus, Rocketboyz, The Lites	The Lites
2003	**Ugress, Tungtvann,** Insense, Furia, Rocketboyz, Vanskapt, Myoclon, Preslex, Troops Of Doom, Granceland Deadhead	Granceland Deadhead
2002	**Kaizers Orchestra, Tungtvann, The Cumshots, Turdus Musicus** Pain Solution, Preslex, Galaxee, Apollo med Goldfinger, Black Roses, Whiteline, Vanskapt	Preslex
2001	Antidugg (list not complete)	Antidugg

**Year**	**Band**	**Winner Open Class**	**Winner Andøy-Class**
2000	**Borknagar, Black Debbath, The Kovenant, Zeromancer, Rocket Boyz,** De Gustibus, Clefairy Doll	DeGustibus	Clefairy Doll
1999	**Espen Thoresen, Explicit Lyrics, Madrugada, Plankton, Mikes Kanarium,** Turdus Musicus, Rocketboyz	Turdus Musicus	Rockboyz
1998	**N-Trance, Trang Fødsel, Morten Abel, D'Sound,** Cornflakes, HC Andersen, Plankton, Cyclophonia, Mikes Kanarium	Cyclophonia	Mikes Kanarium
1997	Immortality, Total Refill (list not complete)	Total Refill	Immortality
1996	**Morten Abel, Lille Lørdag, Peltz, Bare Egil Band,** Cornflakes, Plankton, Silje Dahle	Plankton	Silje Dahle
1995	**The September When, Weld, Flava To Da Bone,** Sweet Lavender, Desultiximaxixystos, Afghan Morning, Distortion	Distortion (Englebarn)	Afghan Morning
1994	**a-ha,** Unbound, F.T.B, Abraxas, Suicide & The Toasters, Bananblene, Cerebral Ceremony, Apple June, Heterofilicia, Surreaistic Dreams, Tribute	Surrealistic Dreams	Tribute
1993	**Morten Harket, Pogo Pops, Return,** Moby Dick, Mandatory, Drosera, Deserted Wind, Garbitch, Geir Hovde, The Belly Of An Architect, Defunkt Reptile, Ariske Maur, Social Immunity, Parasite, Torment, Prinsibel Lies, Notorius Seining, Rølp, Empty Pockets, Born To Rock, The Parsley Gardens, The Spirit Epoche'S, Spit, Sult, Illegal Trust, Death Legion, Anxiety, X & H, Snørr, Shitty Beatles, Soak Adultry, 4 Friske Jordbær, Fruitcage, Gangland, Betrayer, Abby's Adoption, Motorhubro, Picasso, Seven And Seven, Euthanasia, Magnetic Art, Scoda Surf, Seven Seconds, Under Dyna, Black Roses, 2 In One, Ailiens, Alibaba, Bacon Bros, Båndtvang, Bill O' Rights, Birdband, C.H.A.O., Cerebral Ceremony, Creased Emotion, Dark Edge, Dyspepsia, Feedback Government Flu, Hardcore Electronic Soulcraft Orchestra, Hemoridderne, Herr Nilson, Ikkje Peiling, Ill Treat, Indian Summer, Kåre & The Sugers, Kveithaue & Gorrhysene, Nud, Out Special Guest, Ramadan, Rapid Fire, Rubbish, Sacred Death, Scurvy Murny & The Spirren Sprells, Slog, Snørr & Tåra, Swada, Tequila High, The Siste Utvei, Tore Jarl Nordøy, Tørr, Trasig Asfalt & Hypokonderne, Traumatic Flashbacks, Vanirva, Vibeke Sæther & De Pedofile, Wasted Time, Tor Sigurd Larsen	Ill Treat	Tor Sigurd Larsen
1992	**Go Go Gorilla, The September When,** Stjernestøvmix, Ludo, Flimmer, Delirium, Shrønk, Yoghurt, Fendeknuserne, Sirkus, In Blanco, Black Roses, Viryam, Jetlag, Hagridden, P.T.B., Aorta, Buchardts, Baptistgruppa, Crayons, Bad Aim, Execution, Immortality, Lofast, Bøtt, Syto Plasma, Blodfest, Kjønnsbåttn Blandakor, Soda Pop, Misty Fields, Dobbelt Isolert, Sagem Sørvik, Quail The Quagmire, Avfall, Åndelig Føde, Depress Trigger, Vidunderlig Svineri, Ed, X.T.C., Return Of The Indians, Celicia Gel, Exzem, Heimbrygg, Dødfødt, No Name, Depravert, Chimera, Lo-No-Grooves, Birth, Toasted Reefel, Kaotick, Hamster Lotion, Oentum Majus, Genocide, Empire, Passacaglia	Empire	Passacaglia
1991	Reaction, Genofobi (list not complete)	Reaction	Genofobi
1990	Ingenting, Torture & Maktinnehaverne (list not complete)	Ingenting	Torture & Maktinnehaverne
1989	Torn, Johnny Oftedal (list not complete)	Torn	Johnny Oftedal
1988	Let's Go, Whiteline (list not complete)	Let's Go	Whiteline
1987	Spirits, UKIA (list not complete)	Spirits	UKIA
1986	Xta-C, Shark, Alien (list not complete)	Xta-C, Shark (split victory)	Alien
1985	Kark, Export Band (list not complete)	Kark	Export Band
1984	Back Water, Champain (list not complete)	Back Water	Champain
1983	X-Red, Panorama (list likely not complete)	X-Red	Panorama
