= Episode 1 (EP) =

EP by Broiler
- Released: 4 November 2013
- Recorded: 2013
- Genre: Pop
- Label: Universal Music

Broiler chronology
The Beginning (2013)	Episode 1 (2013)

Singles from The Beginning
- 1. "Colors" Released: 29 November 2012

Episode 1 is an EP by Norwegian DJ and electronic music duo Broiler. It was released in Norway as a digital download on 29 November 2013. The EP includes the single "Colors". It peaked at number 19 on the Norwegian Albums Chart.

== Singles ==
- "Colors" was released as the lead single from the album on 29 November 2012. The song peaked at number 18 on the Norwegian Singles Chart.

== Track listing ==
No.	Title	Length
1.	"Colors"	3:25
2.	"Nine"	2:57
3.	"Beautiful Girls" (feat. Magnus Eliassen)	3:57
4.	"The Beat" (feat. A-Lee)	4:05
5.	"Bengal Tiger"	4:08
6.	"The End"	4:56
7.	"Bengal Tiger" (Extended Mix)	5:21
Total length:		28:49

== Chart performance ==
=== Weekly charts ===
Chart (2013–14)	Peak position
Norwegian Albums (VG-lista)	13

== Release history ==
Region	Date	Format	Label
Norway	29 November 2013	Digital download	Universal Music
