= Chris Holsten =

Norwegian singer-songwriter

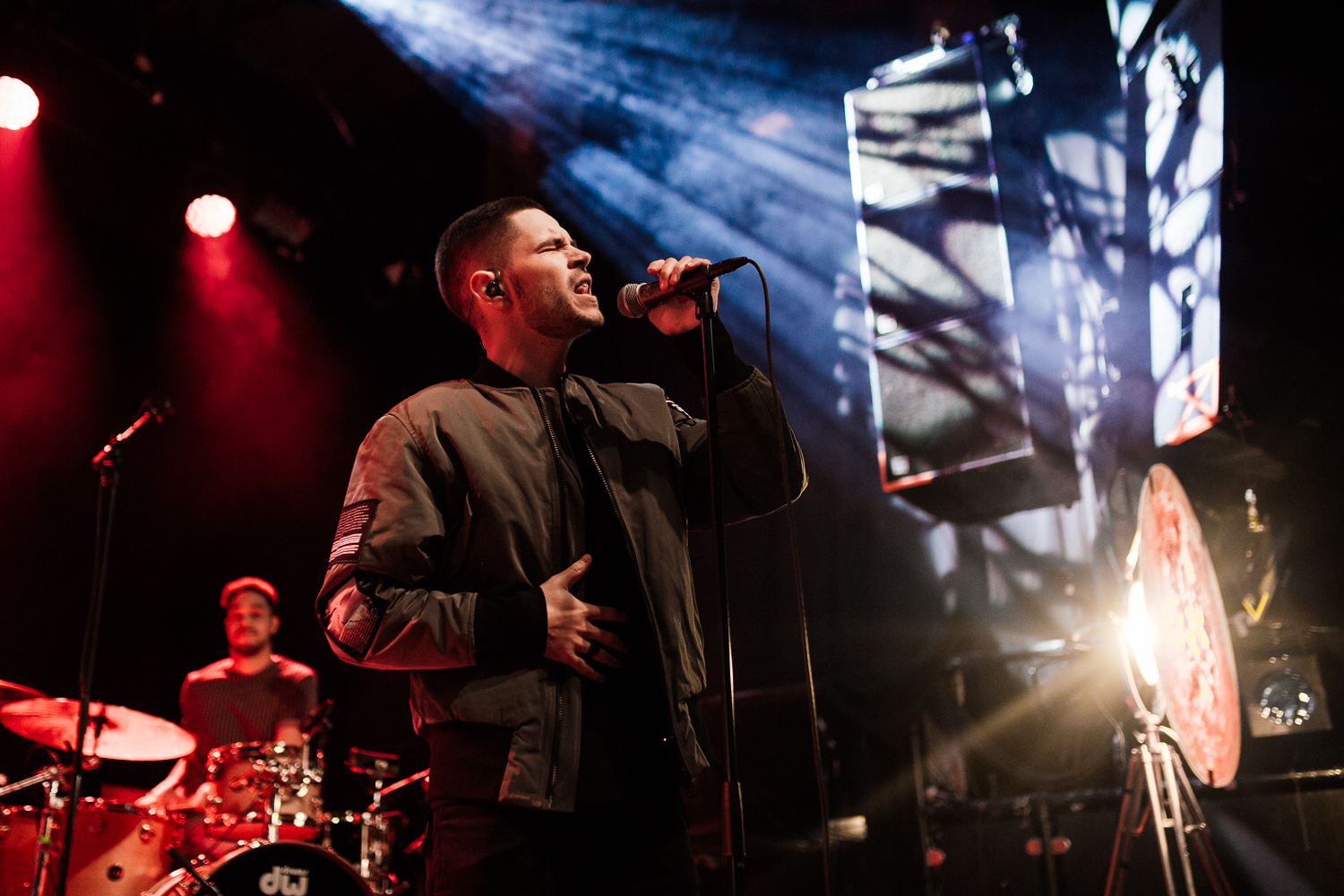
- Chris Holsten performing at by:Larm

Background information
- Born: 4 May 1993 (age 33); Lillestrøm, Norway
- Genres: House; R&B; pop
- Occupation: Singer-songwriter
- Years active: 2014–present
- Label: Warner Music Norway
- Website: www.chrisholsten.com

Christoffer "Chris" Holsten (born May 4, 1993) is a Norwegian singer, songwriter and producer.

== Career ==
Holsten comes from a musical family. He played the title role in a Norwegian language musical production Oliver that played in the Lillestrøm Cultural Center in 2003 when he was just 10 years old. He also ended up with roles in other stage presentations like Skatten på Sjørøverøya and Scrooge and at age 17 started putting musical materials online, ending up with a contract with the Circle management group.

An avid sportsman, he joined the junior level football (soccer) with the local Lillestrøm SK football club following both music and sports simultaneously.

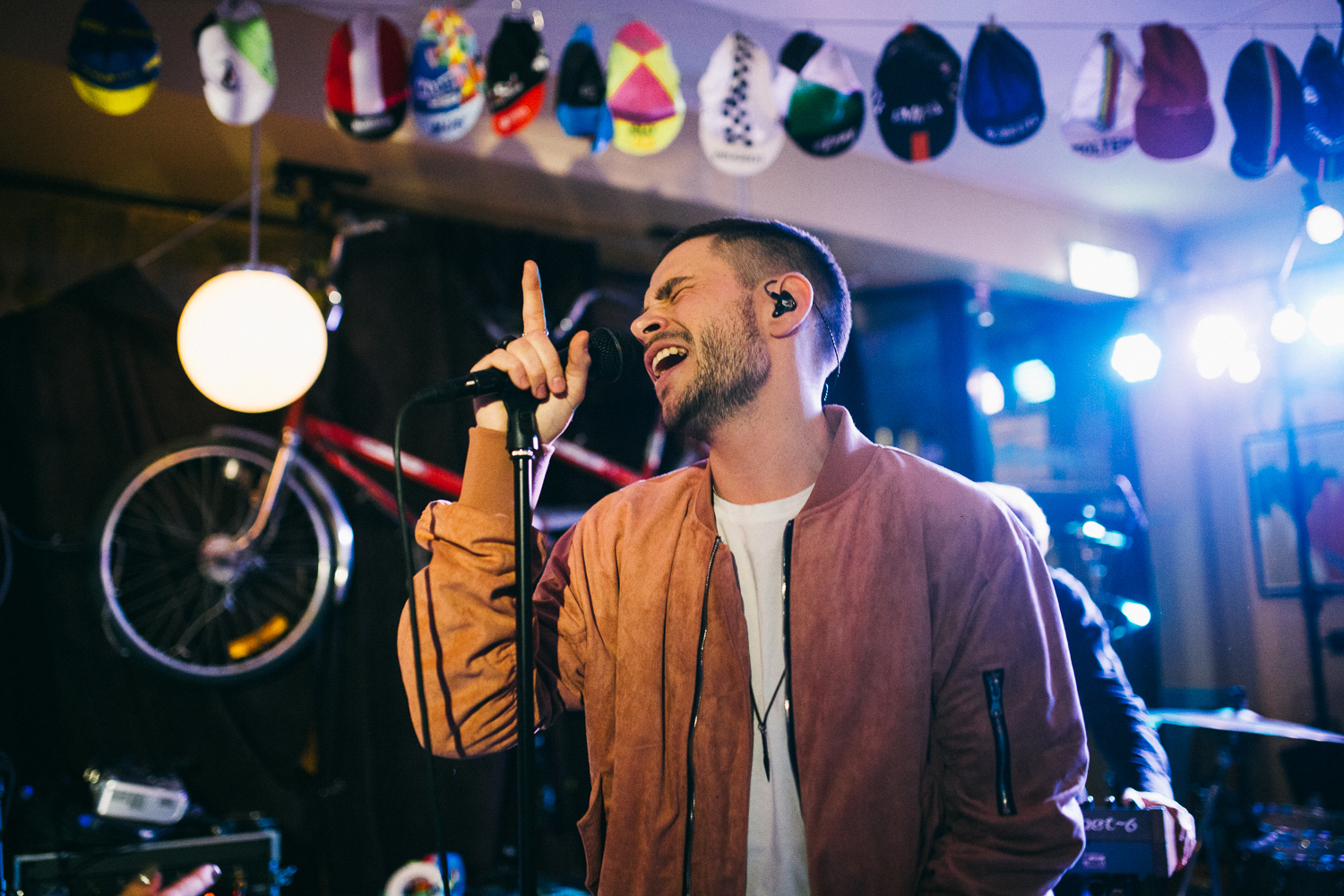
Chris Holsten performing live

=== 2014–present ===
Holsten came to prominence when he was featured in the vocals of Norwegian duo Broiler's 2014 hit "Rays of Light" although he was not credited in the official title of the release. The song reached number 1 on the Billboard Hot Dance Club Songs chart and number 2 on US Billboard Dance/Electronic Songs chart, also charting on VG-lista, the official Norwegian Singles Chart. His vocals were featured also on Martin Björk 2015 song "Ricochet", charting number 1 on iTunes in Sweden. Holsten co-wrote «Happiness», the debut single South Korean girl group Red Velvet released in 2014 alongside Will Simms, Chad Hugo (of The Neptunes) and Anne Judith Wik (of Dsign Music). The song made it number 1 in South Korean Gaon Music Chart.

Holsten released his debut single titled "Layers" written by Holsten along with Katrin Fröder, Anders Kjær and Bernt Rune Stray. A music video was also launched for the song directed by Christian Bastiansen featuring dancer Ragnhild Skar Hajum.

In 2016 he got signed to Warner Music Norway and shortly after he released his single "On My Own" with Norwegian production duo Rat City. The single led him to join the official Norwegian Charts Tour, even though the song never made it to the hit-list itself.

In 2017, he released the song "Mexico" which was a huge success with over 12 million streams on Spotify, followed by the songs "Echo" and "All About You" which he did with Madden. For the second year in a row, Chris performed at VG-Lista Rådhusplassen, in addition to Vulkan Arena, P3 Christine Live and Senkveld.

In 2020, Chris Holsten started the year with the single "Wish I Never Met You" and later "Empty Bottle" which are both to be found on the follow-up EP. The autumn of 2020 started with a solo tour that was to include seven concerts in Norway. The tour started with a concert in Eide, but the remaining concerts were abruptly put on hold due to the pandemic ( covid-19 ) that broke out in 2020. On April 17, 2020, he released his first EP Cold Hearts.

At the beginning of April 2020, Chris Holsten and Frida Ånnevik performed their Norwegian interpretation of the song "If The World Was Ending" by JP Saxe and Julia Michaels. Their version, "If the World", was initially only broadcast on live radio. They also made a recorded version with a video that was later shared on social media. In March 2020, when the Corona pandemic occurred in Norway, the song took on a whole new dimension. The song was officially released and quickly climbed into the VG-List Top 20 where it was for 19 weeks with 10th place as the best position.

== Discography ==
=== Albums ===
Title	Details	Peak chart positions	Certifications
Title	Details	NOR	Certifications
Bak en fasade	Released: 18 March 2022; Label: Warner Music Norway; Format: Digital download, streaming, vinyl	2	IFPI NOR: 3× Platinum
Gå bli lykkelig, du	Released: 22 September 2023; Label: Warner Music Norway; Format: CD, digital download, streaming, vinyl	3	
Bedre dager	Released: 6 February 2026; Label: Warner Music Norway; Format: CD, digital download, streaming, vinyl	6	

==== Live albums ====
Title	Details
Live fra Oslo Spektrum	Released: 22 March 2024; Label: Warner Music Norway; Formats: streaming, digital download

==== EPs ====
Title	Details
Cold Hearts	Released: 17 April 2020; Label: Warner Music Norway; Formats: streaming, digital download
Bak en fasade (Del 1)	Released: 17 September 2021; Label: Warner Music Norway; Formats: streaming, digital download

=== Singles ===
==== As lead artist ====
Title	Year	Peak chart positions	Certifications	Album
Title	Year	NOR	Certifications	Album
"Layers"	2015	—		Non-album singles
"Unproved"	2015	—		Non-album singles
"On My Own" (featuring Rat City)	2016	40	IFPI NOR: Platinum	Non-album singles
"Strip"	2016	—		Non-album singles
"Here We Go Again"	2016	—		Non-album singles
"Mexico"	2017	34	IFPI NOR: Gold	Non-album singles
"All About You" (with Madden)	2017	—		Battle (Soundtrack)
"Love Like This"	2018	—	IFPI NOR: Gold	Non-album singles
"Time Machine"	2018	—		Non-album singles
"Happy Tears"	2018	—		Non-album singles
"Don't Speak"	2019	—		Non-album singles
"I'll Be Alright"	2019	—		Non-album singles
"Empty Bottles"	2020	—		Cold Hearts
"Wish I Never Met You"	2020	—	IFPI NOR: Gold	Cold Hearts
"Hvis verden" (with Frida Ånnevik)	2020	10	IFPI NOR: 2× Platinum	Non-album single
"Shout, Baby"	2020	—		Familiens ære
"Shine"	2020	—		Familiens ære
"Smilet i ditt eget speil"	2021	5	IFPI NOR: Platinum	Bak en fasade
"Bare når det regner "	2021	9		Bak en fasade
"Høyt over havet"	2022	7		Bak en fasade
"For evig"	2022	27		Non-album single
"Rekk opp hånda"	2023	38		Gå bli lykkelig, du
"I eget selskap"	2023	—		Gå bli lykkelig, du
"Tre sekunder"	2023	35		Gå bli lykkelig, du
"Oslo"	2023	—		Gå bli lykkelig, du
"Slå hjerte, slå"	2025	4		Non-album single
"Oppe på månen"	2025	39		Bedre dager
"Store gutter gråter ikke"	2025	35		Bedre dager
"ABBA"	2026	11		Bedre dager
"Siste første dans"	2026	44		Bedre dager
"Så lenge jeg lever"	2026	37		Non-album single
"—" denotes a single that did not chart or was not released.

==== As featuring artist ====
Title	Year	Peak chart positions	Certifications	Album
Title	Year	NOR	Certifications	Album
"Rays of Light" (Broiler featuring Chris Holsten)	2014	11	IFPI NOR: 3× Platinum	Non-album singles
"Ricochet" (Martin Björk featuring Chris Holsten)	2015	—		Non-album singles
"Echo" (Madden featuring Chris Holsten)	2017	—		Non-album singles

=== Other charted songs ===
Title	Year	Peak chart positions	Album
Title	Year	NOR	Album
"Bak en fasade"	2021	13	Bak en fasade
"Slå hjerte, slå"	2022	7	Bak en fasade
"Gå bli lykkelig, du"	2023	20	Gå bli lykkelig, du
