= I Can't Say No =

I Can't Say No or Can't say No may refer to:

- "Can't Say No", the 2012 debut single of Conor Maynard
- "I Cain't Say No", song in the stage play Oklahoma, made famous by Celeste Holm
- "I Can't Say No!", 2015 song by Lea Rue
- "I Can't Say No", song by The Louvin Brothers from Nearer My God to Thee, 1957
- "I Can't Say No", song by Natalie Cole from her 1975 album Inseparable
- "I Can't Say No!!!!!", song by BiS, 2017
