= Golden Light =

Golden Light may refer to:

- Golden Light (film), a 1946 Finnish film
- Golden Light Sutra, a Buddhist text of the Mahayana branch of Buddhism
- "Golden Light", a song by Strfkr from 2013's Miracle Mile (Strfkr album)
- "Golden Light" (song), a song by Madden, 2016
- "Golden Lights", a 1965 single by Twinkle (singer)

== See also ==
- Home at the Golden Light, 1998 album by Cooder Graw
