= The Beginning (Broiler album) =

Studio album by Broiler
- Released: 4 November 2013
- Recorded: 2013
- Genre: Pop
- Label: Universal Music

Broiler chronology
The Beginning (2013)	Episode 1 (2013)

Singles from The Beginning
- 1. "Afterski" Released: 15 November 2012; 2. "Vannski" Released: 16 May 2013; 3. "En gang til" Released: 20 June 2013; 4. "Bonski" Released: 4 November 2013

The Beginning is the first studio album by the Norwegian electronic music duo Broiler. It was released as a digital download in Norway on 4 November 2013. The album includes the singles "Afterski", "Vannski", "En gang til" and "Bonski". It has peaked to number 6 on the Norwegian Albums Chart.

== Singles ==
- "Afterski" was released as the lead single from the album on 15 November 2012. The song peaked at number three on the Norwegian Singles Chart.
- "Vannski" was released as a single on 16 May 2013. The song peaked at number one on the Norwegian Singles Chart.
- "En gang til" was released as a single on 20 June 2013. The song peaked at number eight on the Norwegian Singles Chart.
- "Bonski" was released as a single on 4 November 2013. The song peaked at number five on the Norwegian Singles Chart.

== Track listing ==
No.	Title	Length
1.	"Bonski"	3:41
2.	"Vannski"	3:30
3.	"Afterski"	4:00
4.	"En gang til" (with Sirkus Eliassen)	3:48
5.	"Keegas"	4:06
6.	"Sommertider"	3:17
7.	"Powerbeat"	3:43
8.	"Spacedance"	4:00
9.	"Jul Med Broiler"	3:22
10.	"How I Wet Your Mother"	4:17
11.	"Hokksund"	3:22
12.	"Ayia Napa"	2:59
13.	"Krokstadelva"	2:58
14.	"Møndarn"	3:33
Total length:		50:36

== Charts ==
Chart (2013–2015)	Peak position
Norwegian Albums (VG-lista)	6

== Release history ==
Region	Date	Format	Label
Norway	November 4, 2013	Digital download	Universal Music
