= Rays of Light (song) =

Single by Broiler
- Released: 7 June 2014
- Recorded: 2013
- Genre: Electro; dance
- Length: 3:53
- Label: Sky Music
- Songwriters: Simen Auke; Mikkel Christiansen; Thomas Gustafsson; William Idap; Simon Stromstedt

Broiler singles chronology
"Colors" (2013)	"Rays of Light" (2014)	"Wild Eyes" (2014)

"Rays of Light" is a song written by the Norwegian duo, Broiler. This is the duo's third single of 2014 following "Get Drunk" and "F*** Everybody". It was inspired by Madonna's song "Ray of Light", which was praised positively for its lyrics, inspiration, and qualified dance music technology. This song features vocals from Chris Holsten, whereas the entire mix is done by Broiler and has a lyrics video with sunrise and sunset. This is an electro song that uses piano, guitar, house beats, and synthesizer in parts of the song.

== Reception ==
The song got mostly positive reviews and light because of its lyrics, dance tracks, and mix. MetroLyrics rated it 10/10. Other critics gave it 97%.

== Charts ==
Chart (2014)	Peak position
Norway (VG-lista)	11
US Hot Dance/Electronic Songs (Billboard)	2
US Dance Club Songs (Billboard)	1

== Certifications ==
Region	Certification	Certified units/sales
Norway (IFPI Norway)	3× Platinum	30,000^{‡}
Sweden (GLF)	Gold	20,000^{‡}
^{‡} Sales+streaming figures based on certification alone.
