= En gang til (song) =

Single by Broiler and Sirkus Eliassen

from the album The Beginning
- Released: 20 June 2013
- Genre: Pop
- Length: 3:49
- Label: Sky Music; Universal Music Group

Broiler singles chronology
"Vannski" (2013)	"En gang til" (2013)	"Bonski" (2013)

Sirkus Eliassen singles chronology
"I Love You Te Quiero" (2013)	"En gang til" (2013)

"En gang til" is a single from Norwegian DJ and electronic music duo Broiler and Norwegian band Sirkus Eliassen. It was released in Norway on 20 June 2013 for digital download. The song peaked at number 8 on the Norwegian Singles Chart. The song is included on Broiler's debut studio album The Beginning (2013).

== Track listing ==
Digital download
No.	Title	Length
1.	"En Gang Til"	3:49

== Charts ==
Chart (2013)	Peak position
Norway (VG-lista)	8

== Release history ==
Country	Date	Format	Label
Norway	20 June 2013	Digital download	Sky Music; Universal Music Group
