= Madden (music producer) =

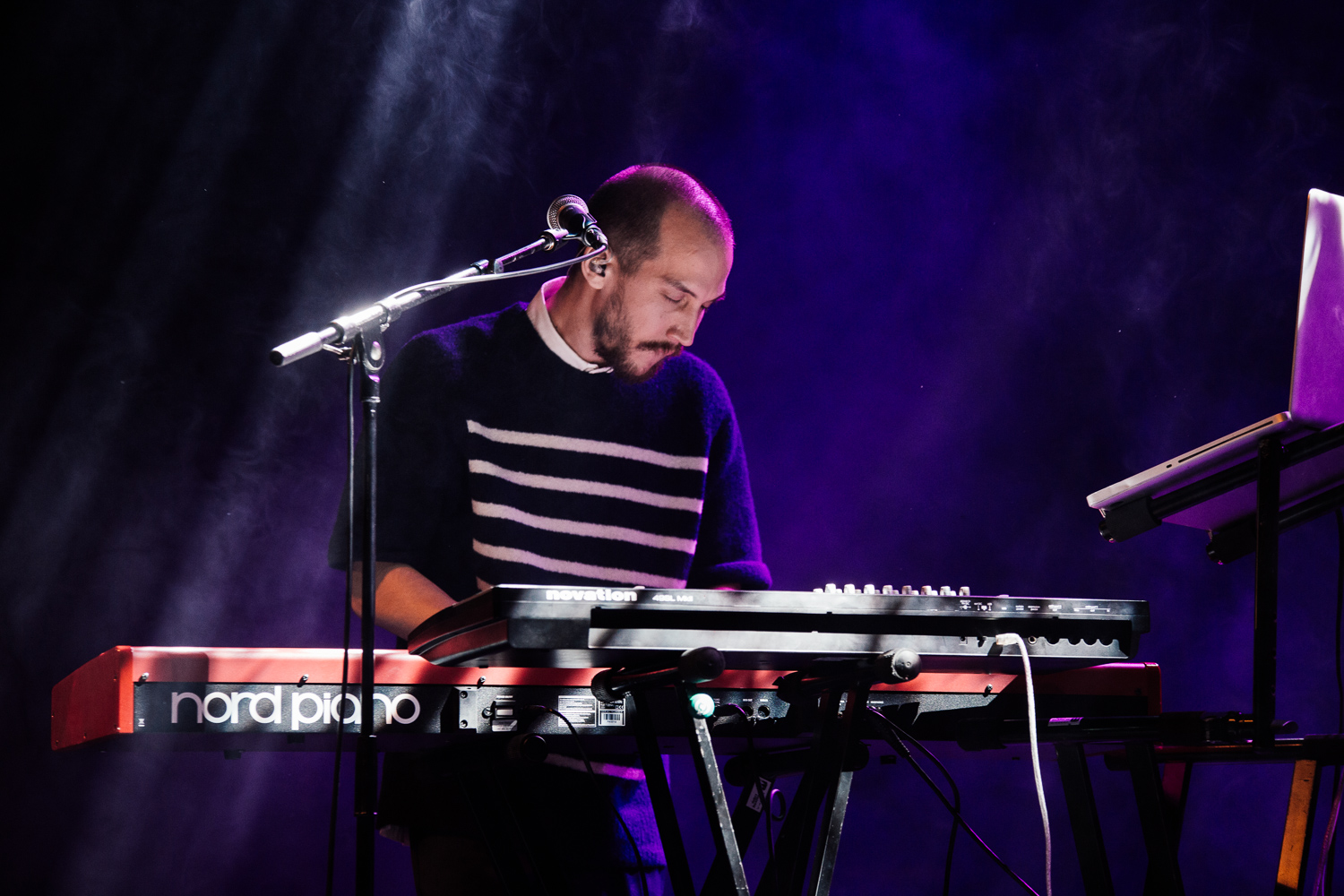

Background information
- Born: Marius Njølstad; February 6, 1989 (age 37)
- Origin: Nesodden, Norway
- Genres: EDM; pop
- Occupations: Singer; songwriter; producer
- Instrument: Keys
- Years active: 2010–present
- Label: Warner Music Norway
- Website: maddenofficial.com

Marius Ygre Njølstad (born February 6, 1989), professionally known as Madden, is a Norwegian singer, songwriter and producer. He started his solo career in 2016, when he signed with Warner Music Norway.

== Career ==
Marius had an early interest in music, and started playing the piano at age 7. His dedication to music led him to take a degree in jazz at Berklee in Copenhagen, as well as a degree in arrangement/music technology at the Norwegian Academy of Music. Through his studies he met Daniel Wold, and they created the duo Kontraktor together, following a writing session back in 2010.

In their debut year, they won the John Lennon Songwriting Contest with their track "Bocce Ball" in the category Electronic. Still, their collab ended two years later.

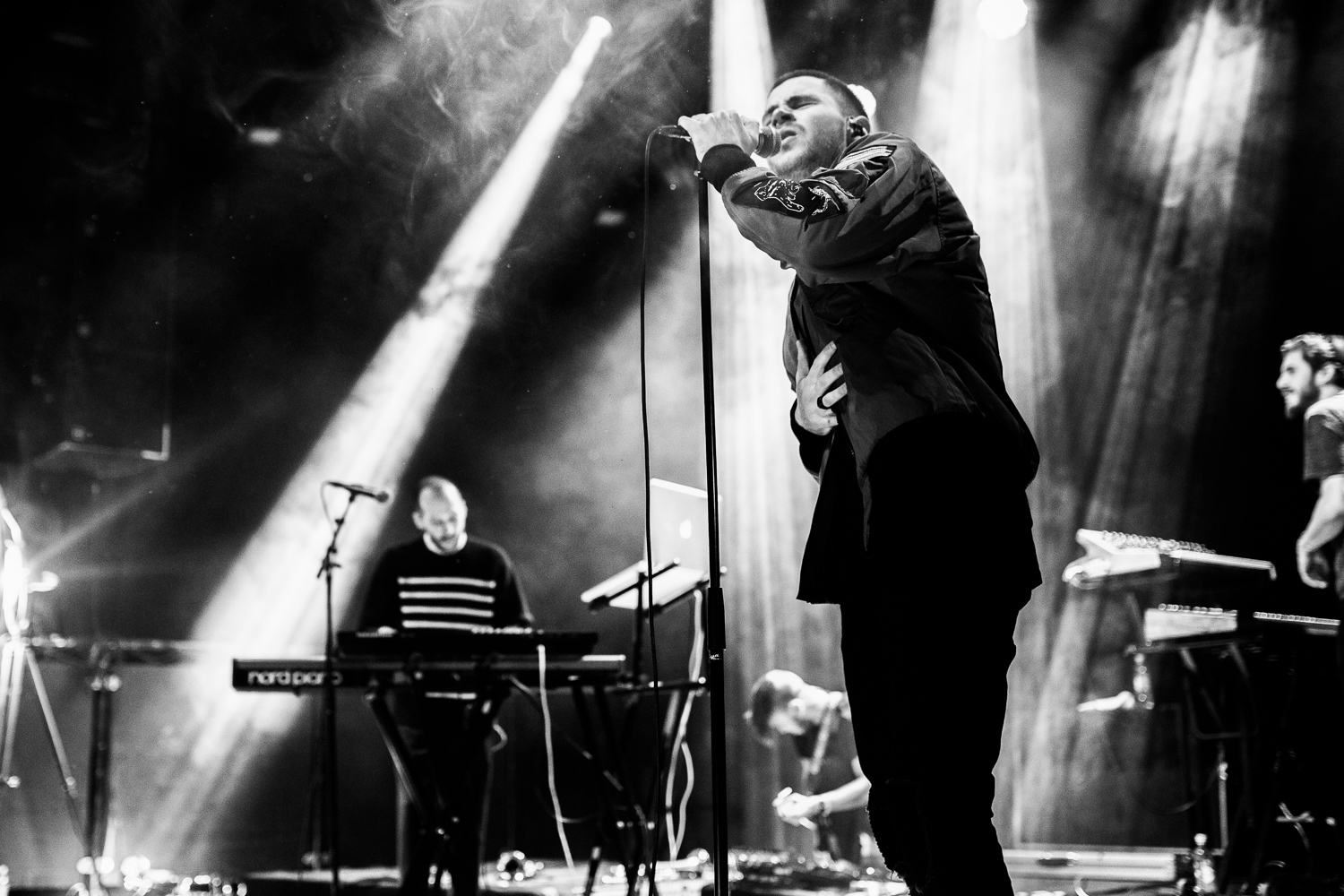
Madden and Chris Holsten performing at by:Larm 2017

=== 2016–present ===
Madden started his solo-career with the release of his first single "Golden Light" in the spring of 2016. The song features vocals from artist 6 am, and it spent a total of 19 weeks on the official Norwegian charts VG-lista top 40, where it peaked at No. 10. The song also reached official charts in other countries, including its peak as No. 14 in Sweden, where it spent 23 weeks. The song reached top 100 charts in Denmark, Belgium, the Netherlands and Ireland, as well as reaching the top 200 chart in the UK over the summer of 2016.

The attention around the track led Madden to be a part of the official VG-lista tour of 2016. He performed at the main event in Oslo, which attracted close to 60,000 people.

In the fall of 2016 he released his second single, "Alive", which reached No. 19 in official Norwegian charts and spent a total of 11 weeks on the list. It was also featured on Swedish top 100 charts.

== Discography ==
Singles

- Golden Light (featuring 6 am) (2016)
- Alive / Alive (Acoustic) (2016)
- Echo (featuring Chris Holsten) (2017)
- All About You (featuring Chris Holsten) (2017)
- Totally (2019)'
- Love you right (2019)
