= Tim Cantor =

American surrealism artist and writer

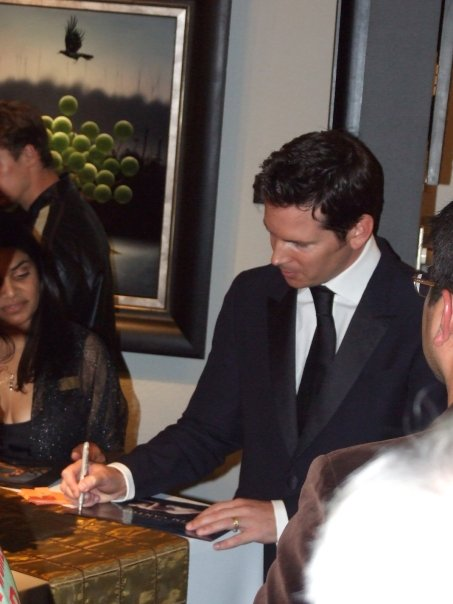
Tim Cantor at his October 9, 2009 Art Show in San Diego

Tim Cantor (born August 10, 1969) is an American surrealist artist and writer.

== Early life ==
Cantor was raised in Marin County, California. He showed interest in drawing from a very young age. Cantor began oil painting when he was 5 using the belongings of his great-grandfather, who himself was an English artist. After finishing high school in Marin County, he began traveling and exhibiting his paintings in galleries and open-air events throughout the Western United States. After seven years on the road he decided to display his paintings exclusively in fine art galleries. In 2000, Cantor established Ashby Galleries.

== Art style ==
Cantor paints primarily using oils on a variety of different surfaces. However, he does uses other media such as watercolor and charcoal to create studies for larger compositions. He has a traditional style using brushes and paint. He mentions historical Dutch, Flemish, and Renaissance methods as some of his inspirations. Some of his newer paintings are very much intertwined with poetry and stories of his own. He is self-taught.

"Ballad and Shield" by Tim Cantor

== Exhibitions ==
=== 2016 - Present ===
In 2016, Cantor exhibited his work "Sweet Favour & Fiend" in New York City. The exhibit was housed at the AFA Art Gallery in Soho, NYC. In 2019, Tim Cantor held his 'Yesteryear' exhibition. In the winter of 2019, The Tim Cantor Gallery of Amsterdam opened with a permanent collection of his works. In 2024 his works titled 'Hollandiaque' was exhibited in his Amsterdam gallery and primarily showcased his works made during the previous two years. Cantor has also worked on a joint exhibition with surrealist artist Michael Parkes.

== Projects ==
In 2014, Cantor began working with Imagine Dragons for their second studio album, Smoke + Mirrors. In all, the cover and an additional 13 paintings are works by Cantor; related to each song of the album. All three singles released – "I Bet My Life", "Gold", and "Shots" – feature Cantor's work. The paintings are included in the limited edition of the album. The music video for "Shots" is also visually themed around Cantor's artworks.

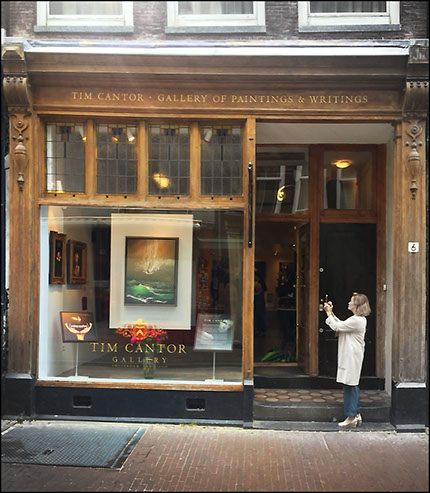
Tim Cantor Gallery Amsterdam

Tim Cantor and his artwork were on tour with the band Imagine Dragons for their Smoke + Mirrors North American Tour. Most of the tour stops had featured an art gallery in the venue, showcasing Cantor's artworks.

He has published two major books of his paintings and related writings, one in 2005 and other in 2012.

== Other Media ==
Cantor's work is the cover art for Across the Universe by Evanesence.
