= Broiler (music producers) =

Norwegian electronic music record producer and DJ duo

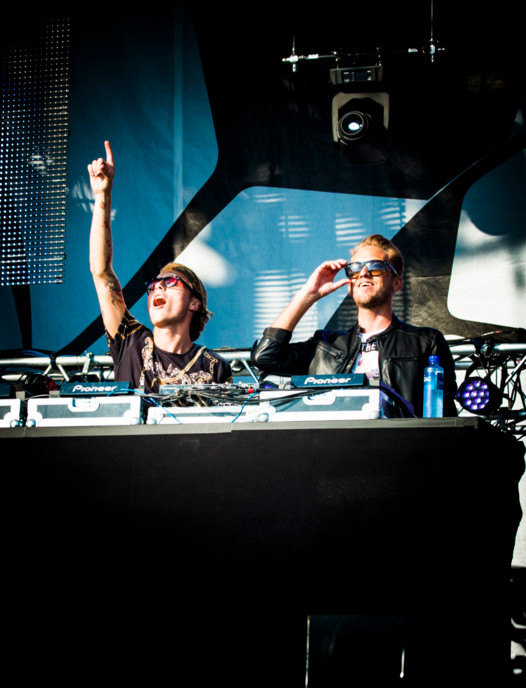

Background information
- Also known as: DJ Broiler 2011–2013
- Origin: Drammen, Norway
- Genres: Tropical house; progressive house; electro house
- Years active: 2011–present
- Label: Universal
- Members: Mikkel Christiansen (1992); Simen Auke (1991)
- Website: www.broiler.com

Broiler is a Norwegian electronic music DJ and record production duo made up of Mikkel Buxrud Christiansen (born 22 April 1992) and Simen Auke (born 22 April 1991). In 2011, they found online success with their dance tunes consisting of comical elements, but have since focused on professional remixing and music production.

== Music career ==
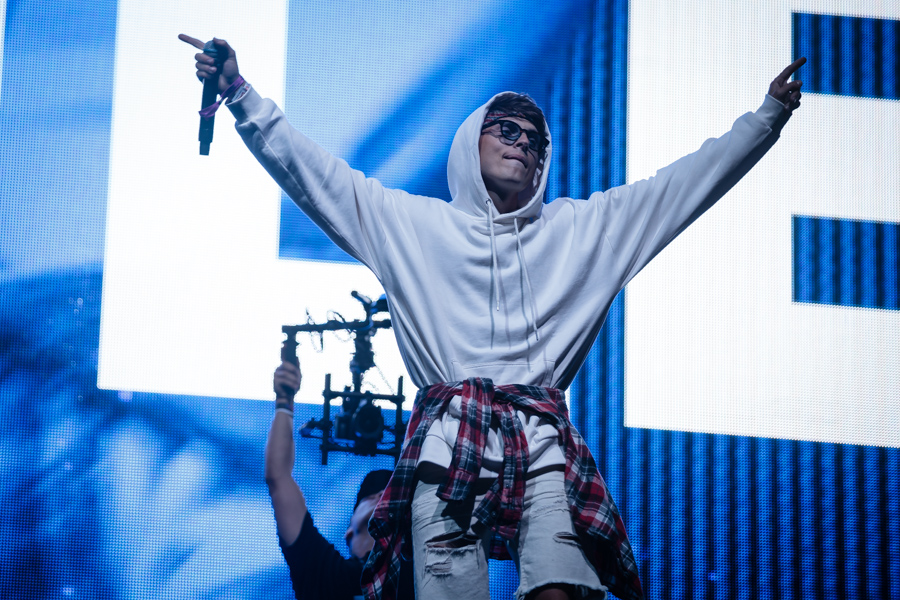
Broiler performing in 2018

=== Early career ===
In 2011, Mikkel Christiansen had some success with "Navy Seals" featuring F. Genius. Same year, Simen Auke had major success with his song "Cannabus" under the pseudonym SimenA, who charted on the Norwegian Singles Chart for two weeks.

=== 2012–2013: The Beginning ===
DJ Broiler released several singles and got famous for their funny videos, which often portrayed and parodied the life in the suburbs and local cities around Drammen. They released "Afterski" in November 2012, which instantly became a hit and charted on the Norwegian Singles Chart, peaking at number 3. In May 2013 they released "Vannski", which reached number one in its third week of charting and became their first number one hit in Norway. "En gang til" was released in June 2013, reaching number 8 on the Norwegian Singles Chart. Their debut studio album The Beginning was released on 4 November 2013, reaching a peak of 6 on the Norwegian Albums Chart. The album also includes the single "Bonski", which reached number 5 on the Norwegian Singles Chart. On 29 November 2013 Broiler released the Episode 1 EP, which peaked at number 19 on the Norwegian Albums Chart. The EP includes the single "Colors", which later reached number 18 on the Norwegian Singles Chart.

== Discography ==
=== Albums ===
Title	Album details	Peak chart positions
Title	Album details	NOR
The Beginning	Credited as: Broiler; Released: 4 November 2013; Label: Universal Music; Format: Digital download, CD	6

=== Extended plays ===
Title	Details	Peak chart positions
Title	Details	NOR
Episode 1	Credited as: Broiler; Released: 29 November 2013; Label: Universal Music; Format: Digital download, CD	13

=== Singles ===
Title	Year	Peak chart positions								Certifications	Album
Title	Year	NOR	AUT	BEL (Fl)	BEL (Wa)	DEN	FRA	SWE	US Dance	Certifications	Album
"Afterski"	2012	3	—	—	—	—	—	—	—		The Beginning
"Vannski"	2013	1	—	—	—	—	—	—	—	IFPI NOR: Platinum	The Beginning
"En gang til" (with Sirkus Eliassen)	2013	8	—	—	—	—	—	—	—	IFPI NOR: 7× Platinum	The Beginning
"Bonski"	2013	5	—	—	—	—	—	—	—		The Beginning
"Colors"	2013	18	—	—	—	—	—	—	—		Episode 1
"Get Drunk" (featuring Dirt Nasty and Andy Milonakis)	2014	—	—	—	—	—	—	—	—		Non-album singles
"Fuck Everybody" (featuring Dex Carrington)	2014	—	—	—	—	—	—	—	—	IFPI NOR: Gold	Non-album singles
"Rays of Light"	2014	11	—	—	—	—	—	—	2	IFPI NOR: 3× Platinum; GLF: Gold	Non-album singles
"Wild Eyes" (featuring Ravvel)	2014	1	70	4	25	11	138	—	—	IFPI NOR: 3× Platinum; BRMA: Gold; GLF: Gold; IFPI DEN: Platinum	Non-album singles
"For You" (featuring Anna Bergendahl)	2014	21	—	—	—	—	—	—	—	IFPI NOR: Platinum	Non-album singles
"Fly by Night" (featuring Tish Hyman)	2015	4	—	—	—	—	—	—	—		Non-album singles
"Money" (featuring Bekuh BOOM)	2016	3	—	—	—	—	—	—	—		Non-album singles
"Lay It on Me" (with Ina Wroldsen)	2016	2	—	—	—	—	—	—	—	IFPI NOR: 2× Platinum	Non-album singles
"Daydream"	2016	19	—	—	—	—	—	—	—		Non-album singles
"Amazing" (featuring Kurt Nilsen)	2017	20	—	—	—	—	—	—	—		Non-album singles
"Goodbye to Love" (with Nico Santos)	2017	—	—	—	—	—	—	—	—		Non-album singles
"Undercover" (with Voli)	2017	31	—	—	—	—	—	—	—		Non-album singles
"Mirror"	2018	28	—	—	—	—	—	—	—		Non-album singles
"A Little Longer"	2018	28	—	—	—	—	—	—	—	IFPI NOR: Platinum	Non-album singles
"Do It"	2019	12	—	—	—	—	—	—	—		Non-album singles
"Good Idea" (with Bekuh Boom)	2019	—	—	—	—	—	—	—	—		Non-album singles
"All My Friends" (with CLMD and Torine)	2021	34	—	—	—	—	—	—	—		Non-album singles
"The Way Our Story Goes" (with Money for Nothing)	2021	18	—	—	—	—	—	—	—		Non-album singles
"I Got No One" (with Skinny Days)	2021	30	—	—	—	—	—	—	—		Non-album singles
"OMG" (with Sofiloud)	2022	5	—	—	—	—	—	—	—	IFPI NOR: 2× Platinum	Non-album singles
"Bap" (with Kamelen and Emma Steinbakken)	2022	5	—	—	—	—	—	—	—	IFPI NOR: 2× Platinum	Non-album singles
"Åtte Shots" / "Åtta Shots" (with Papito Mierda or ODZ)	2022	2	—	—	—	—	—	25	—		Non-album singles
"Oh No" (with Caden)	2022	10	—	—	—	—	—	—	—	IFPI NOR: Gold	Non-album singles
"Det eneste jeg vil er å ha det fett" (with PandaPanda)	2022	6	—	—	—	—	—	—	—		Non-album singles
"Rain" (with Tessa Odden)	2023	32	—	—	—	—	—	—	—		Non-album singles
"1" (with Hjorterud Allé)	2023	1	—	—	—	—	—	—	—	IFPI NOR: Platinum	Non-album singles
"02:57" (with Aiba)	2023	40	—	—	—	—	—	—	—		Non-album singles
"Idiot" (with PandaPanda)	2023	13	—	—	—	—	—	—	—		Non-album singles
"Når du slår ut håret blir jeg slått ut" (with Beathoven)	2024	1	—	—	—	—	—	—	—		Non-album singles
"Mujaffa" (with Kamelen)	2024	4	—	—	—	—	—	—	—		Non-album singles
"Amok" (with Kamelen)	2024	26	—	—	—	—	—	—	—		Non-album singles
"Stemmene i hodet" (with Kamelen)	2025	16	—	—	—	—	—	—	—		Non-album singles
"Dumme Boys" (with Stig Brenner and Arif Murakami)	2025	11	—	—	—	—	—	—	—		Non-album singles
"Kjendisfest" (with Kamelen)	2025	24	—	—	—	—	—	—	—		Non-album singles
"Opp og nikke" (with Bell and Bargee)	2025	58	—	—	—	—	—	—	—		Non-album singles
"Ta meg med"	2025	60	—	—	—	—	—	—	—		Non-album singles
"—" denotes a single that did not chart or was not released.

=== Remixes ===
Title	Original artist(s)	Year	Peak chart positions	Album
Title	Original artist(s)	Year	NOR	Album
"Happy Home"	Hedegaard	2014	—	Non-album remix
"Shots"	Imagine Dragons	2015	4	Smoke + Mirrors
"It's You"	Syn Cole	2015	10	Non-album remixes
"I Can't Say No!"	Lea Rue	2015	17	Non-album remixes
"Hurts So Good"	Astrid S	2016	—	Non-album remixes
"What Do You Love"	Seeb (featuring Jacob Banks)	2017	—	Non-album remixes
"—" denotes a recording that did not chart or was not released.
