= Afterski =

Single by Broiler

from the album The Beginning
- Released: 15 November 2012
- Genre: Dance
- Length: 4:29
- Label: theBizmo; Phonofile

Broiler singles chronology
"Afterski" (2012)	"Vannski" (2013)

"Afterski" is the debut single from Norwegian DJ and electronic music duo Broiler. It was released in Norway on 15 November 2012 for digital download. The song peaked at number 3 on the Norwegian Singles Chart. The song is included on their debut studio album The Beginning (2013)

== Music video ==
A music video to accompany the release of "Afterski" was first released onto YouTube on 15 November 2012 at a total length of five minutes and eights seconds.

== Track listing ==
Digital download
No.	Title	Length
1.	"Afterski"	4:29

== Charts ==
Chart (2012–2013)	Peak position
Norway (VG-lista)	3

== Release history ==
Country	Date	Format	Label
Norway	15 November 2012	Digital download	theBizmo; Phonofile
