= Vannski =

Single by Broiler

from the album The Beginning
- Released: 16 May 2013
- Genre: Pop
- Length: 3:31
- Label: Sky Music; Universal Music

Broiler singles chronology
"Afterski" (2012)	"Vannski" (2013)	"En gang til" (2013)

"Vannski" is a single from Norwegian DJ and electronic music duo Broiler. It was released in Norway on 16 May 2013 as a digital download. The song peaked at number one on the Norwegian Singles Chart, making it their first number-one single in Norway. The song is included on their debut studio album The Beginning (2013).

== Track listing ==
Digital download
No.	Title	Length
1.	"Vannski"	3:31

== Charts ==
Chart (2013)	Peak position
Norway (VG-lista)	1

== Release history ==
Country	Date	Format	Label
Norway	16 May 2013	Digital download	Sky Music; Universal Music
