= Shots (Imagine Dragons song) =

Single by Imagine Dragons

from the album Smoke + Mirrors
- Released: January 26, 2015
- Recorded: 2014 at Imagine Dragons Studio; (Las Vegas, Nevada)
- Genre: Dance-rock; synth-pop; new wave
- Length: 3:52
- Label: KIDinaKORNER; Interscope
- Songwriters: Ben McKee; Daniel Platzman; Dan Reynolds; Wayne Sermon
- Producer: Imagine Dragons

Imagine Dragons singles chronology
"Gold" (2014)	"Shots" (2015)	"Roots" (2015)

Music video
- "Shots" on YouTube

"Shots" is a song by American rock band Imagine Dragons. It was written by band members Ben McKee, Daniel Platzman, Dan Reynolds and Wayne Sermon, and released as the third and final single from their second studio album Smoke + Mirrors (2015).

== Composition ==
The song shows influence of industrial music with heavy use of synthesizers. Reynolds' vocals are light, despite the dark lyrical content, recalling music from the 1980s. Sermon's guitar textures add complexity.

== Promotion ==
Imagine Dragons performed the track during a first ever live commercial (for Target) during the Grammy Awards (2015). The advertising was filmed on Las Vegas' Fremont Street under the direction of Jonas Åkerlund. The advertising promoted an exclusive edition of the album available at Target which includes four bonus tracks. It was estimated to cost $8 million and charted at number 2 on the Billboard Trending 140.

"Shots" was performed on The Tonight Show Starring Jimmy Fallon (February 18, 2015), The Howard Stern Show (March 24, 2015), The Ellen DeGeneres Show (2015), and Today (2015).

== Music video ==
On February 12, 2015, Imagine Dragons released the official music video for "Shots". The video was directed by Robert Hales and was inspired by the artwork created by San Diego–based painter Tim Cantor. The same artwork also serves as the cover art for all of the singles for the album. Cantor himself appears as the live depiction of one of his paintings.

== Track listing ==
Digital download
No.	Title	Writer(s)	Producer(s)	Length
1.	"Shots"	Ben McKee; Daniel Platzman; Dan Reynolds; Wayne Sermon	Imagine Dragons	3:53

Digital download – Broiler Remix
No.	Title	Writer(s)	Producer(s)	Length
1.	"Shots" (Broiler remix)	Ben McKee; Daniel Platzman; Dan Reynolds; Wayne Sermon	Imagine Dragons	3:10

Digital download – Shots EP
No.	Title	Writer(s)	Producer(s)	Length
2.	"Shots" (Astrolith remix)	McKee; Platzman; Reynolds; Sermon	Imagine Dragons	3:29
3.	"Shots" (Acoustic (Piano) / Live From The Smith Center / Las Vegas)	McKee; Platzman; Reynolds; Sermon	Imagine Dragons	4:21
4.	"Shots" (Broiler Extended Club Remix)	McKee; Platzman; Reynolds; Sermon	Imagine Dragons	4:48
5.	"Shots" (BLV Remix)	McKee; Platzman; Reynolds; Sermon	Imagine Dragons	3:24
6.	"Shots" (The Young Professionals Remix)	McKee; Platzman; Reynolds; Sermon	Imagine Dragons	4:30

== Personnel ==
Imagine Dragons

- Dan Reynolds – lead vocals, percussion, songwriting, production
- Wayne Sermon – guitar, songwriting, production
- Ben McKee – bass guitar, synthesizers, songwriting, production
- Daniel Platzman – drums, percussion, songwriting, production

== Broiler remix ==
In April 2015, Norwegian DJ and electronic music duo Broiler (Mikkel Christiansen and Simen Auke) released a remix of "Shots". It was a hit in its own right on VG-lista, the official Norwegian Singles Chart, reaching number 4 on the chart. A music video for the remix was released about 2 months later, on June 4.

== Chart performance ==
=== Weekly charts ===
Weekly chart performance for "Shots"
Chart (2015)	Peak position
Australia (ARIA)	66
Austria (Ö3 Austria Top 40)	73
Belgium (Ultratip Bubbling Under Flanders)	12
Belgium (Ultratip Bubbling Under Wallonia)	4
Canada Hot 100 (Billboard)	72
Denmark (Tracklisten)	32
France (SNEP)	170
Germany (GfK)	60
Italy (FIMI)	69
Mexico Anglo (Monitor Latino)	19
Norway (VG-lista)	3
Sweden (Sverigetopplistan)	51
UK Singles (Official Charts Company)	91
US Billboard Hot 100	75
US Adult Pop Airplay (Billboard)	14
US Alternative Airplay (Billboard)	16
US Hot Rock & Alternative Songs (Billboard)	7
US Rock & Alternative Airplay (Billboard)	22

Broiler Remix

Chart (2015)	Peak position
Norway (VG-lista)	4

=== Year-end charts ===
2015 year-end chart performance for "Shots"
Chart (2015)	Position
US Billboard Adult Alternative Songs	32
US Billboard Alternative Songs	42
US Billboard Hot Rock Songs	16
US Billboard Rock Digital Songs	33

== Certifications ==
Certifications and sales for "Shots"
Region	Certification	Certified units/sales
Brazil (Pro-Música Brasil)	2× Platinum	120,000^{‡}
Denmark (IFPI Danmark)	Platinum	60,000^{^}
Germany (BVMI)	Gold	200,000^{‡}
Italy (FIMI)	Platinum	50,000^{‡}
New Zealand (RMNZ)	Platinum	30,000^{‡}
Norway (IFPI Norway)	3× Platinum	120,000^{‡}
Spain (Promusicae)	Platinum	60,000^{‡}
Sweden (GLF)	3× Platinum	120,000^{‡}
United Kingdom (BPI)	Gold	400,000^{‡}
United States (RIAA)	Platinum	1,000,000^{‡}
^{^} Shipments figures based on certification alone.^{‡} Sales+streaming figures based on certification alone.

== Release history ==
Release dates for "Shots"
Country	Date	Format	Label
United States	February 2, 2015	Digital download	KIDinaKORNER; Interscope
Italy	February 6, 2015	Contemporary hit radio	Interscope
United States	March 3, 2015	Modern rock radio	KIDinaKORNER
