= Ravvel =

Belgian songwriter and producer

Nina Sampermans
- Also known as: Ravvel
- Born: Nina Sampermans; 1993 (age 32–33); Antwerp, Belgium
- Genres: Pop; Indie pop
- Occupations: Singer, songwriter
- Years active: 2011–present

Nina Sampermans (Dutch pronunciation: [ˈninaː ˈsɑmpərˌmɑns]; born 1993), known professionally as Ravvel, is a Belgian singer and songwriter. She is known for her work with, among others, Broiler, Hooverphonic and Gjon's Tears.

== Early life and education ==
Sampermans was born in Antwerp in 1993 to a sound engineer and a music teacher. In 2016, she graduated from the Codarts University for the Arts in Rotterdam, Netherlands.

== Career ==
Sampermans began her career as a songwriter in 2011. In early 2012, Walter Mannaerts, Jean Bosco Safari and she submitted the song "Would You?" to Eurosong 2012: Een song voor Iris, the Belgian preselection for the Eurovision Song Contest 2012. The song was chosen by VRT to compete in the final, and was ultimately selected to represent Belgium in the Eurovision Song Contest 2012 with 53% of the televote.

In late 2014 and early 2015, she broke through as a singer with the single "Wild Eyes", which she had recorded with the Norwegian electronic music duo Broiler. The single peaked at the top of the VG-lista and at number 4 in the Flemish Ultratop Singles Chart. One year later, Sampermans became one of the three lead singers of the Belgian band Hooverphonic during their In Wonderland tour.

Following the cancellation of the Eurovision Song Contest 2020, Dutch composer Wouter Hardy and she co-wrote the song "Tout l'univers" for the Swiss representative Gjon's Tears at a songwriting camp in Zürich. The song was selected by a professional jury to represent Switzerland in the Eurovision Song Contest 2021. At Eurovision, the entry finished in third place with 432 points; Switzerland's best placement since 1993.

== Discography ==
=== Singles ===
==== As lead artist ====
| Title | Year | Album |
|---|---|---|
| "Pick Your Poison" | 2018 | Non-album single |
| "Ego" (Roufaida cover) | 2019 | Ego (The Reworks) |
| "Stay" | 2020 | Stay / Leave |
| "Leave" | 2020 | Stay / Leave |

==== As featured artist ====
| Title | Year | Peak chart positions | | | | | | Album |
| Title | Year | AUT | BEL (FL) | BEL (WA) | DNK | FRA | NOR | Album |
|---|---|---|---|---|---|---|---|---|
| "Wild Eyes" (Broiler ft. Ravvel) | 2014 | 70 | 4 | 25 | 11 | 138 | 1 | Non-album single |

==== Uncredited lead vocals ====
| Title | Year | Artist | Album |
|---|---|---|---|
| "Gij zijt alles" | 2017 | Charl Delemarre | Charl |
| "365" | 2020 | Phuture Noize | Silver Bullet |

== Songwriting discography ==
| Title | Year | Artist | Album | Co-writers |
|---|---|---|---|---|
| "Big Bang" | 2011 | Alexandra | Junior Eurosong 2011 | Guus Fluit, Alexandra Gadzina, Walter Mannaerts, Wouter Vander Veken |
| "In de band" | 2011 | Bandits | Bandits | Guus Fluit, Walter Mannaerts, Wouter Vander Veken |
| "Would You?" | 2012 | Iris | Seventeen | Walter Mannaerts, Jean Bosco Safari |
| "Wild Eyes" | 2014 | Broiler ft. Ravvel | Non-album single | Simen Auke, Mikkel Christiansen, Christoffer Huse, Trond Opsahl |
| "My Love Is Yours" | 2015 | Merdan Taplak | Imperial Dancefloor Material | Serge Ramaekers, Merdan Taplak |
| "That's Life" | 2015 | Anna Rune | Non-album single | Anna De Volder |
| "Gij zijt alles" | 2017 | Charl Delemarre | Charl | Charl Delemarre |
| "Homebound" | 2017 | Droeloe | A Moment in Time | Arie Storm, Vincent Jacobus Rooijers |
| "Game" | 2018 | Jill Shaw | Non-album single | David Poltrock, Jill Shaw |
| "Lethal Skies" | 2018 | Hooverphonic | Looking for Stars | Alex Callier |
| "Paranoid Affair" | 2018 | Hooverphonic | Looking for Stars | Alex Callier |
| "On and On" | 2018 | Hooverphonic | Looking for Stars | Alex Callier |
| "Run All the Red Lights" | 2019 | Bovie & Gaillard ft. Meds | Non-album single | Yves Gaillard, Daniel Van Wouwe |
| "Love Vaccination" | 2019 | Billie | Love Vaccination | Mohamed Alitou, Billie Bentein, Joel Macdonald |
| "Grey Zone" | 2019 | Sem Thomasson | Non-album singles | Thomas Sempels |
| "Hiding" | 2019 | Tessa Dixson | Non-album singles | Luuk Cox, Tessa Dixson, Reinhard Vanbergen |
| "Control" | 2019 | Ibe | Non-album singles | Hans Francken, Ibe Wuyts |
| "Summer Sun" | 2020 | Hooverphonic | Non-album singles | Alex Callier |
| "365" | 2020 | Phuture Noize | Silver Bullet | Marco Spronk, Robert Spronk |
| "Mistakes" | 2020 | Sem Thomasson | Non-album single | Thomas Sempels |
| "Push & Pull" | 2021 | Sem Thomasson | Non-album single | Thomas Sempels |
| "Tout l'univers" | 2021 | Gjon's Tears | Non-album single | Wouter Hardy, Xavier Michel, Gjon Muharremaj |
| "Long Night" | 2021 | Ola | Non-album single | Wouter Hardy, Olamide Polet |
| "Wasted Time" | 2021 | Charles | Falling While Rising | Charlotte Foret, Wouter Hardy |
| "Riddle" | 2021 | Charles | Falling While Rising | Charlotte Foret, Wouter Hardy |
| "Without You" | 2021 | Charles | Falling While Rising | Charlotte Foret, Wouter Hardy |
| "The Fall" | 2021 | Charles | Falling While Rising | Charlotte Foret, Wouter Hardy |
| "Far Gone" | 2021 | Charles | Falling While Rising | Charlotte Foret, Wouter Hardy |
| "He Knows" | 2021 | Charles | Falling While Rising | Charlotte Foret, Wouter Hardy |
| "Moody" | 2021 | Sarah B | Non-album single | Sarah Bossuwe |
| "A Simple Glitch of the Heart" | 2021 | Hooverphonic | Hidden Stories | Alex Callier |
| "Lift Me Up" | 2021 | Hooverphonic | Hidden Stories | Alex Callier |
| "Bridges" | 2022 | Alika | Non-album singles | Alika Milova, Wouter Hardy |
| "Before the Party's Over" | 2024 | Mustii | Non-album singles | Pierre Dumoulin, Benoit Leclercq, Thomas Mustin, Arianna D'amato, Charlotte Clark |

=== Eurovision Song Contest entries ===
| Year | Country | Song | Artist | Semi-final | | Final | | Marcel Bezençon Awards |
| Year | Country | Song | Artist | Place | Pts. | Place | Pts. | Marcel Bezençon Awards |
|---|---|---|---|---|---|---|---|---|
| 2012 | Belgium | "Would You?" | Iris | 17 | 16 | Did not qualify | | — |
| 2021 | Switzerland | "Tout l'univers" | Gjon's Tears | 1 | 291 | 3 | 432 | Composer Award |
| 2023 | Estonia | "Bridges" | Alika | 10 | 74 | 8 | 168 | — |
| 2024 | Belgium | "Before the Party's Over" | Mustii | 13 | 18 | Did not qualify | | — |
