= Erik & Kriss =

Norwegian rap duo

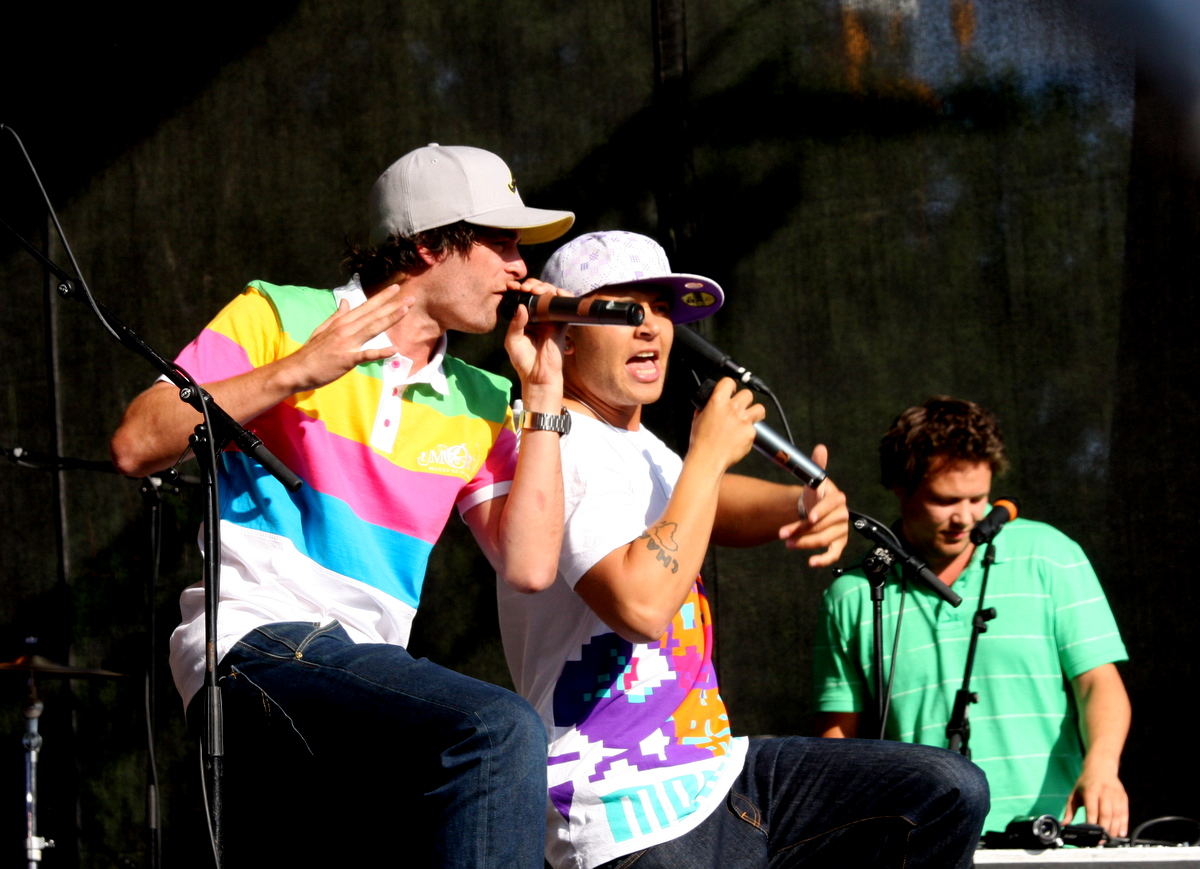
- Erik & Kriss in 2009

Background information
- Origin: Bærum, Norway
- Genres: Hip-hop; pop; R&B
- Years active: 2002–present
- Label: Brickwall Studio Productions
- Members: Erik Mortvedt; Kristoffer Tømmerbakke
- Website: www.erikogkriss.no

Erik og Kriss, sometimes styled as Erik & Kriss, is a Norwegian rap group created by Erik Mortvedt and Kristoffer Tømmerbakke. The duo became popular through the Internet with the song Bærumsgrammatikk in 2004 and later with Putt Diamanter Opp in 2006. In 2007, they finished their first album, Gull og Grønne Skoger, and followed that with their second album, Verden Vil Bedras, in early 2008.

Their popularity grew even further after the release of their second album, first through the single Dra Tilbake which was released nearing the end of 2007, and more so after the release of Det E'kke Meg Det Er Deg in the middle of 2008. Record sales, frequent airplay on many of Norway's radio stations, and frequent performances pushed them to become one of Norway's most popular artists in rap and hip hop.

== History ==
Erik og Kriss began their musical career when they created the russ song "Legenden" in 2002 for their own russebus of the same name and made it available on the bus's ad hoc website. After their bus received media attention and distinguished itself among the russ through winning the prize Årets Lydbuss at the national russ meeting in Stavanger, along with Årets Buss at Eikeli videregående skole, they began to actively produce songs that were made available on their website. In a short period of time, they became known on the Internet and among the younger crowd in their home municipality of Bærum. They were initially creating the songs in their bedrooms, but they took the next step to a more professional location after Kriss started collaborating with the music producer Svein E. Fjellstad and started a studio and production company, Brickwall Studio Productions.

The duo went into business with the ArtistPartner agency in the start of 2006, who took over all the paper work, and set up the group's concert and travel plans. This increased the number of concert appearances drastically. In the summer of 2006, the group signed a contract with the record company MTG Music. The work on their debut album began immediately after the agreement. In January 2007, the group's website registered over 250,000 downloads, and since the first record release, the group had a long series of concerts, often with other popular musicians. In total the duo had over 100 concert performances in 2007.

They debuted with their first album, Gull og Grønner Skoger, on 12 March 2007. The album received mixed reviews from the press, but sold well in its first week. On the charts, the record was ranked 29th, and 9th among Norwegian artists. The release concert was held 15 March 2007 at Parkteatret.

Later, on 14 January 2008, the group released their follow-up album Verden Vil Bedras, less than a year after their first record was released. Similar to their first album, Gull og Grønne Skoger, it also received mixed reviews from the press. Dagbladet gave it a rating of two out of a possible six, but Stavanger Aftenblad gave it a rating of five out of six. The release concert was at Rockefeller Music Hall on 19 January 2008 where they performed for a full house.

== Musical style ==
=== Lyrics ===
After the duo created the song "Bærumsgramatikk", which is a self-ironic, humorous, and satirical interpretation of the situation in Bærum, they have repeatedly used the theme in their songs. In the song, they try to dispel the myths about their hometown being exaggeratingly majestic, affluent, and conceited. Both in the song "Oppblåst På Livstid", and in "Putt Diamanter Opp", which is a cover of Lil' Kims "Lighters Up", they shape an exaggerated and almost pompous portrait of Bærum and their own adolescence. On their later record, Verden Vil Bedras, they moved away from focusing on Bærum and peoples thoughts and feelings about the place.

Recently, after the group reached an agreement with MTG Music, the lyrics of Erik og Kriss have been characterized as having a more serious undertone. The themes include drug abuse, bullying, and the media's incessant use of scare tactics.

=== Production ===
The tracks are produced mainly by Kriss, who with his experience from Noroff and his home studio has become a well known producer in the genre. Both albums are produced at Brickwall Studio Productions, while the earlier songs were created at Kriss' home studio.

At other times, they employ other producers. The most known of these is Alis from Klovner i Kamp, and Andyboy, who produced the songs "Lille Norge" and "Kvinne".

== Contributions ==
During the period before their debut album, the vocalists Thomas Seeberg and Maria Sandsdalen contributed to many songs. Sandsdalen continued to collaborate with her vocals on both of the albums. The media personality Tor Milde contributes in the song "Anmeldelsen" from Gull og Grønne Skoger produced by football player Christer George. On Verden Vil Bedras, the country singer Finn Wang, rock vocalist Martin Diesen from Inglow, and the world-renowned American rapper Coolio contribute. For concerts, they have Eirik «Lydmann» Gjessing along with them as tour manager, DJ and factotum.

== Other activities ==
In the fall of 2008, Erik og Kriss took part in TVNorges the biggest production ever, with the TV program Grease along with Henriette Lien. It was a talent show which was used to find two candidates for the channel's own musical based on the original Grease. They worked as reporters and followed the program contestants.

== Discography ==
=== Albums ===
| Year | Album | Peak positions |
| Year | Album | NOR |
|---|---|---|
| 2007 | Gull og grønne skoger | 29 |
| 2008 | Verden vil bedras | 24 |
| 2009 | Tabu | 17 |
| 2011 | Back to Business | 5 |
| 2013 | Fem | 21 |
| 2014 | Halvfullt | – |

=== Singles ===
| Year | Single | Peak positions | Album |
| Year | Single | NOR | Album |
|---|---|---|---|
| 2007 | "Lille Norge" | – | |
| 2007 | "Den låta" | 10 | |
| 2007 | "Dra tilbake" | 3 | |
| 2008 | "Ut mot havet" | – | |
| 2008 | "Det e'kke meg det er deg" (with Finn Wang) | 2 | |
| 2008 | "Porno" | 6 | |
| 2009 | "Svigemors drøm" | 2 | |
| 2009 | "Pol til pol" (featuring Harald Rønneberg) | 9 | |
| 2009 | "Rundt fingern" | 6 | |
| 2009 | "Hverdagshelt" | – | |
| 2010 | "Lighter" | 6 | |
| 2011 | "My City" (featuring Nik & Jay) | 15 | |
| 2011 | "Ølbriller" (featuring Byz) | 2 | |
| 2011 | "Etter regnet" | 2 | |
| 2012 | "Frostrøyk" | – | |
| 2013 | "Puls" | – | |
| 2013 | "Kjør kjør" | – | |
| 2015 | "Ut på gulvet" (featuring Tokyo Diiva) | – | |
| 2015 | "Hvis du vil ha meg" | – | |
| 2016 | "Pusterom" (featuring Katastrofe and Moi) | 22 | |
| 2016 | "Superhelt" (featuring Serlina) | – | |
| 2017 | "Det er alle de små tingene som gjør livet stort" | – | |
| 2018 | "Skuffe Meg" | | |

== Prizes and awards ==
- Gold Record for Den Låta
- Platinum Record for Dra Tilbake
- Platinum Record for Det e'kke meg det er deg
- "Årets Gruppe" on NRJ Music Awards in 2008
- "Best Norwegian Act" on MTV EMA in 2008

== Sources ==
- Erikogkriss.no - Biography
- Yeye.no: Erik & Kriss på vei mot toppen
