= Wild Eyes (Broiler song) =

Single by Broiler featuring Ravvel
- Released: 10 November 2014
- Recorded: 2014
- Genre: Deep house; tropical house
- Length: 3:24
- Label: Sky Music
- Songwriters: Nina Sampermans; Simen Auke; Mikkel Christiansen; Christoffer Huse; Trond Opsahl

Broiler singles chronology
"Rays of Light" (2014)	"Wild Eyes" (2014)	"For You" (2014)

Ravvel singles chronology
"Wild Eyes" (2014)

Music video
- "Wild Eyes" on YouTube

"Wild Eyes" is a song by Norwegian electronic music duo Broiler featuring vocals by Belgian singer Ravvel. It was released in Norway in November 2014 and peaked at the top of VG-lista, the official Norwegian Singles Chart in its second week of release. The song's chorus samples a portion of the song "Zonnestraal" by producer and DJ De Hofnar.

== Music video ==
A lyric video was released casting Minna Anke. After a few months a music video was released accompanying Minna Anke and Samuel Armitage. It shows a couple in Hawaii romancing and things happening after they break up. It is a prequel to the lyric video.

== Chart performance ==
=== Weekly charts ===
Chart (2014–2015)	Peak position
Austria (Ö3 Austria Top 40)	70
Belgium (Ultratop 50 Flanders)	4
Belgium (Ultratop 50 Wallonia)	25
Denmark (Tracklisten)	11
France (SNEP)	138
Norway (VG-lista)	1
Sweden Heatseeker (Sverigetopplistan)	2

=== Year-end charts ===
Chart (2015)	Position
Belgium (Ultratop Flanders)	33
Denmark (Tracklisten)	67

== Certifications ==
Region	Certification	Certified units/sales
Belgium (BRMA)	Gold	15,000^{*}
Denmark (IFPI Danmark)	Platinum	60,000^{^}
Norway (IFPI Norway)	3× Platinum	30,000^{‡}
Sweden (GLF)	Gold	20,000^{‡}
^{*} Sales figures based on certification alone.^{^} Shipments figures based on certification alone.^{‡} Sales+streaming figures based on certification alone.
