= Bonski =

Single by Broiler

from the album The Beginning
- Released: 4 November 2013
- Genre: Pop
- Length: 3:41
- Label: Sky Music; Universal Music Group
- Songwriters: Fredrik Auke; Simen Auke; Jesper Borgen; Mikkel Christiansen; Christoffer Huse; Trond Opsahl

Broiler singles chronology
"En gang til" (2013)	"Bonski" (2013)	"Colors" (2013)

"Bonski" is a single from Norwegian DJ and electronic music duo Broiler. It was released in Norway on 4 November 2013 for digital download. The song peaked at number 5 on the Norwegian Singles Chart. The song is included on their debut studio album The Beginning (2013).

== Music video ==
A music video to accompany the release of "Bonski" was first released onto YouTube on 8 November 2013 at a total length of three minutes and forty-one seconds.

== Track listing ==
Digital download
No.	Title	Length
1.	"Bonski"	3:41

== Charts ==
Chart (2013–2014)	Peak position
Norway (VG-lista)	5

== Release history ==
Country	Date	Format	Label
Norway	4 November 2013	Digital download	Sky Music; Universal Music Group
