= Colors (Broiler song) =

Single by Broiler

from the album Episode 1
- Released: 29 November 2013
- Genre: Dance-pop
- Length: 3:25
- Label: Sky Music; Universal Music Group

Broiler singles chronology
| "Bonski" (2013) | "Colors" (2013) | "Rays of Light" (2014) |

"Colors" is a single from Norwegian DJ and electronic music duo Broiler. It was released in Norway on 29 November 2013 for digital download. The song peaked at number 18 on the Norwegian Singles Chart. The song is included on their EP Episode 1 (2013).

== Track listing ==
Digital download
| No. | Title | Length |
|---|---|---|
| 1. | "Colors" | 3:25 |

== Charts ==
| Chart (2013) | Peak position |
|---|---|
| Norway (VG-lista) | 18 |

== Release history ==
| Country | Date | Format | Label |
|---|---|---|---|
| Norway | 29 November 2013 | Digital download | Sky Music; Universal Music Group |
