= Golden Light (song) =

Single by Madden featuring 6AM
- Released: 18 March 2016
- Recorded: 2015/16
- Genre: Pop
- Length: 3:27
- Label: Warner Music Norway
- Songwriter(s): Andreas Garmack: Marius Njølstad; Haakon Simen Raugland

"Golden Light" is a song by Norwegian artist Madden featuring vocals from 6AM. It was released as a digital download in Norway on 18 March 2016 through Warner Music Norway. The song has peaked to number 10 on the Norwegian Singles Chart.

== Music video ==
A music video to accompany the release of "Golden Light" was first released onto YouTube on 12 May 2016 at a total length of three minutes and twenty-five seconds.

== Track listing ==
Digital download
No.	Title	Length
1.	"Golden Light" (feat. 6AM)	3:27

== Chart performance ==
=== Weekly charts ===
Chart (2016)	Peak position
Belgium (Ultratip Bubbling Under Wallonia)	49
Denmark (Tracklisten)	32
Ireland (IRMA)	91
Netherlands (Single Top 100)	92
Norway (VG-lista)	10
Sweden (Sverigetopplistan)	14
UK Singles (Official Charts Company)	173
US Dance Club Songs (Billboard)	24
US Hot Dance/Electronic Songs (Billboard)	24

=== Year-end charts ===
Chart (2016)	Position
Sweden (Sverigetopplistan)	69
US Hot Dance/Electronic Songs (Billboard)	87

== Certifications ==
Region	Certification	Certified units/sales
Denmark (IFPI Danmark)	Gold	45,000^{‡}
Norway (IFPI Norway)	2× Platinum	120,000^{‡}
Sweden (GLF)	2× Platinum	80,000^{‡}
^{‡} Sales+streaming figures based on certification alone.

== Release date ==
Region	Date	Format	Label
Norway	18 March 2016	Digital download	Warner Music Norway
