= Magnus Eliassen =

- Born: Magnus Eliassen; 2 January 1981 (age 45)
- Origin: Bodø, Norway
- Genres: Pop, R&B, Soul, Fusion
- Occupations: Singer, songwriter, record producer
- Instruments: Vocals, guitar
- Years active: 1997 – present
- Labels: Beyond Records, Smart Patrol Records, Monomegamy
- Website: magnuseliassen.com

Magnus Eliassen (born 2 January 1981 in Bodø) is a Norwegian singer-songwriter and record producer.

In 2003, under the pseudonym Magnetisk Nord, he released his debut EP Tinglysing. He had a single entitled "Lois is Happy". In 2005, he released his studio solo album entitled Second Grace on Monomegamy Records and gaining popularity won the by:Larm Audience Award in 2006. Since then, he has had a number of releases and collaborations.

In 2011, he recorded the charity single "Til dem du e glad i", in collaboration with Kråkesølv with proceeds going to the Norwegian Røde Kors (Red Cross)

In 2011, Eliassen returned to the chart in the form of band named Sirkus Eliassen (being a duo between Magnus Eliassen and his younger brother Erik Eliassen). The single entitled "Hjem til dæ" reached No. 16 on VG-lista, the official Norwegian Singles Chart.

== Discography ==
=== Albums ===
- 2005: Second Grace

=== EPs ===
- 2003: Tinglysing (as Magnetisk Nord)

=== Singles ===
- 2003: "Lois Is Happy"
- 2011: "Hjem til dæ" (as duo Sirkus Eliassen)
- 2011: "Til dem du e glad i" (Magnus Eliassen with Kråkesølv)
- 2011: "På ei bru i Amsterdam"
- 2013: "Æ vil ut" (Magnus Eliassen with Nellson)
