= Lea Rue =

Belgian singer-songwriter

Emma Lauwers (born 1 October 1993), known as Lea Rue, is a Belgian singer-songwriter and entrepreneur.

Emma Lauwers competed as a candidate on The Voice van Vlaanderen (The Voice of Flanders) in 2014, though she did not win the competition.

Emma is also regularly on various stages in Flanders. In 2015, it became known that the nightingale from The Voice is unpacking with her own musical project. As a stage name Lea Rue, she picked up with her own first single I Can’t Say No! so that nothing stands in her way of breaking through internationally.

Emma is also a woman entrepreneur who founded 'The Bank'.

== Life and career ==
Education

Emma graduated from Arteveldehogeschool (Artevelde University of Applied Sciences) in 2018 with a major in Communication.

Language

She is proficient in English, Dutch, French, Spanish, and German languages.

Singing Career

Lauwers began her singing career on The Voice van Vlaanderen, where she was coached by Axelle Red. In 2015 her track "I Can't Say No!" reached number 2 on the Ultratop Belgian Singles Chart and number 14 on VG-lista in Norway.

2016-2018

- Release 3 singles under the name Lea Rue (I can't say no, Sleep), label Mostiko.
- Remixes of singles by Lost Frequencies, Broiler.
- Numerous live performances with Lost Frequencies (BBC radio 1, Top of the Pops, AB Brussels, Rock Werchter, Brussels Summer Festival, Music for Life, RTL Late night, Radio 538 NL, Mnm, Q-music, Madrid, Cologne ..).
- Various international performances live & TV as Lea Rue (Barcelona, UEFA-cup Milan, Beirut)

2015

- Backing singer of winner The Voice 2015, Tom De Man
- Recordings for various DJs including Regi Penxten, Serge Raemaekers
- Signing artist contract with record company CNR/Mostiko (releases under "Smash The House", label Dimitri Vegas & Like Mike)
- Live performances on Q-Music, MNM, Club FM as Lea Rue and with Lost Frequencies.

2013/2014

"The Voice Van Vlaanderen"/VTM - Half finalist in team Axelle Red.

== Discography ==
=== Singles ===
List of singles, with selected chart positions
Year	Song	Peak positions				Album
Year	Song	BEL (Fl)	BEL (Wa)	NOR	SWE	Album
2015	"I Can't Say No!"	2	2 (Ultratip*)	14	84	
2015	"Sleep!"	2	42	—	—	
2018	"River"	59	—	—	—	
2019	"Watching You"	52	—	—	—	
2020	"Une Minute"	—	—	—	—	
2022	"Code rood" (with Jaap Reesema)	12	—	—	—	
2023	"Company"	—	—	—	—	
2024	"Bla Bla Bla" (with OSKI)	—	—	—	—	

*Did not appear in the official Belgian Ultratop 50 charts, but rather in the bubbling under Ultratip charts
