= I Can't Say No! =

2015 single by Lea Rue

Single by Lea Rue
- Released: 13 July 2015
- Recorded: 2015
- Length: 3:18
- Label: Smash The House; CNR (distribution)
- Songwriter(s): Yves Gaillard; Emma Lauwers; Simen Auke; Mikkel Christiansen
- Producer(s): Yves Gaillard

Broiler singles chronology
"I Can't Say No!" (2015)

"I Can't Say No!" is a song by Lea Rue written by Yves Gaillard, Emma Lauwers, Simen Auke and Mikkel Christiansen and produced by Yves Gaillard. The song was very popular in Belgium reaching number 2 on the Ultratop Belgian Singles Chart.

A remix by Norwegian DJs Broiler was also a chart success on VG-lista, the Norwegian Singles Charts and on Sverigetopplistan, the Swedish Singles Chart. A much lengthier remix by Filterheadz was also released.

== Track list ==
No.	Title	Length
1.	"I Can't Say No!"	3:18
2.	"I Can't Say No!" (Broiler Remix)	3:24
3.	"I Can't Say No!" (Filterheadz Remix)	6:54
Total length:		13:36

== Charts ==
=== Weekly charts ===
Chart (2015)	Peak position
Belgium (Ultratop 50 Flanders)	2
Belgium (Ultratip Bubbling Under Wallonia)	2
Norway (VG-lista)	14
Sweden (Sverigetopplistan)	84

=== Year-end charts ===
Chart (2015)	Position
Belgium (Ultratop Flanders)	40

== Certifications ==
Region	Certification	Certified units/sales
Belgium (BEA)	Gold	15,000^{*}
^{*} Sales figures based on certification alone.
