= Sirkus Eliassen =

Norwegian musical band

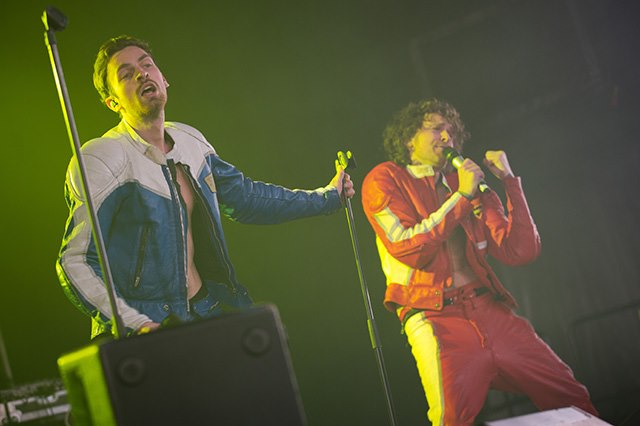
- Sirkus Eliassen on 2013

Background information
- Origin: Bodø, Norway
- Genres: Pop
- Instrument(s): Vocals, guitar
- Years active: 2011 – 2013 (on indefinite hiatus)
- Members: Erik Eliassen; Magnus Eliassen

Sirkus Eliassen is a Norwegian band consisting of brothers Magnus Eliassen and Erik Eliassen. The duo was formed in 2011 releasing its single "Hjem til dæ" that achieved high rotation on Norwegian radio and became a hit on VG-lista, the official Norwegian Singles Chart.

In November 2011 they released their second single «Opp ned bak frem», followed by «Æ vil bare dans» in February 2012 and «Før du går» in June the same year. Sirkus Eliassen's seven singles has achieved 43 x platinum in Norway. All seven singles have been playlisted on national radio in Norway.

Their biggest hit, «Æ vil bare dans», was the most streamed, Norwegian song on both Spotify and WiMP in 2012. The song also achieved the Spellemannprisen for "Hit of the year 2012" the same year. The duo have performed «Æ vil bare dans» at over ten national TV shows in Norway.

In February 2013, Sirkus Eliassen took part in the Melodi Grand Prix performing the song "I Love You Te Quiero".

== Discography ==
=== Singles ===
Year	Single	Chart Peak	Chart Peak	Weeks	Certifications Norway
Year	Single	NOR	DEN	Weeks	Certifications Norway
2011	"Hjem til dæ"	16	51	7	8× Platinum
2011	"Opp ned bak frem"	—	—	—	5× Platinum
2012	"Æ vil bare dans"	3	13	28	15× Platinum
2012	"Før du går"	11	—	7	5× Platinum
2012	"Verden skulle gå under"	—	—	—	Gold
2012	"Fullstendig feilfri"	—	—	—	Gold
2013	"I Love You Te Quiero"	—	40	—	2× Platinum
2013	"En gang til" (with Broiler)	8	—	10	7× Platinum
