= Inglow =

Norwegian rock band

INGLOW
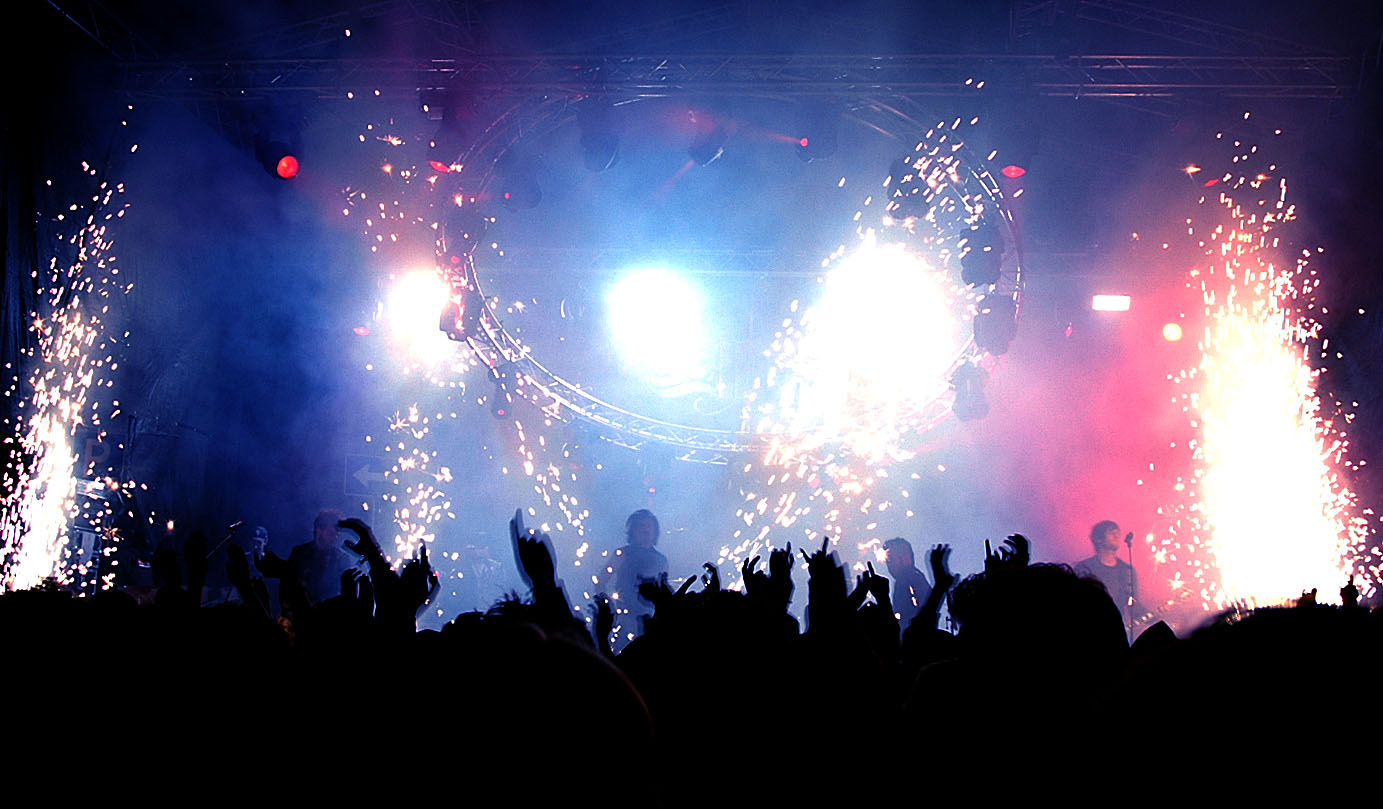

Background information
- Origin: Bærum, Oslo Norway
- Genres: Alternative rock, post-hardcore, punk rock, Alternative metal
- Years active: 2000—present
- Members: Martin Diesen; Syver Normann; Andreas Rustad; Christian Svendsen; Ruben Larssen
- Website: www.INGLOW.net

Inglow is a rock band from Oslo, Norway, formed in 2000. Since 2009, the band has consisted of Martin Diesen (lead vocals, songwriter), Syver Normann (guitar), Andreas Rustad (guitar), Christian Svendsen (drums) and Ruben Larssen (Bass). Previously, the group also featured bassists Janna Smedhaugen, Kevin Alvaro (now of Marathon) and drummer Joakim Arnesen.

To date, Inglow have released one studio EPs – The End Of Yesterday (EP 2004), one studio album - Till Deaf Do Us Part (CD 2007) and currently are recording their second studio album "INGLOW".

== History ==
Inglow was formed in 2000 and made their first demo EP "Womb" in 2001. In 2003 the EP "Eclipse" was released followed by the music video for the song "Better" in 2002. In November 2004 the band released their third EP, "The End Of Yesterday" with the music video for the song "Blended Sherry". In September 2007 they released their first studio album, Till Deaf Do Us Part. In November 2007 they supported Muse in Trondheim. It was released three singles from this album, "Not for Sale" (2007), "monster" (2007) and "As I Am" (2008). "As I Am" was on the Norwegian Billboards; VG lista Topp 20 for six weeks in the summer of 2008. The music video for "Not for Sale" was shown on MTV.

In late 2008 bass player Kevin Alvaro left the band. In 2009 toured Inglow Germany with their new bassist Ruben Larssen. They released the single "Remember" in March of that year. It stayed three weeks on VG lista Topp 20. In 2010, drummer Joakim Arnesen was replaced with Christian Svendsen (from The Cumshots, Goth Minister, Tjuder) after an amputation on his left foot. In 2011 they went in DUB Studio to record their second studio album with producer Endre Kirkesola. In 2012 Inglow signed with German manager Oliver Schuette and released the music video for "Free Fallin '". Their second album "INGLOW" was scheduled to be released during 2012.

Inglow has supported Muse, Gluecifer, Span, Animal Alfa, Brett Anderson and TNT.

== Members ==
- Martin Diesen: Vocals
- Syver Normann: Guitar
- Andreas Rustad: Guitar
- Christian Svendsen: Drums
- Ruben Larssen: Bass

== Former members ==
- Yashar Alousha - vocals (1999–2002)
- Jan Erik Smedhaugen - bass (1999–2006)
- Kevin Alvaro - bass (2006–2008)
- Joakim Arnesen - drums (1999–2009)

== Discography ==
=== Album ===
- Womb (EP 2001 demo)
- Eclipse (EP 2003 Vineyard Studios)
- The End Of Yesterday (EP 2004 Lost Records/SRC Productions)
- Till Deaf Do Us Part (CD 2007 MTG MUSIC)

=== Singles ===
- Better (2002) - from Eclipse (EP 2003 Vineyard Studios)
- Blended Sherry (2004) - from The End Of Yesterday (EP 2004 Lost Records/SRC Productions)
- Not for Sale (2007) - from Till Deaf Do Us Part (CD 2007 MTG MUSIC)
- Monstrum (2007) - from Till Deaf Do Us Part (CD 2007 MTG MUSIC)
- As I Am (2008) - from Till Deaf Do Us Part (CD 2007 MTG MUSIC)
- Remember (2009)
- Free Fallin´ (2012)

=== Compilations ===
- Sidespor I(2001)
- Østerås Invitational (2002)
- Sidespor II (2002)
- Sidespor III (2003)
- Bandpromote No. 15 US Compilation (2004)
- Prosjekt 101 (2006 Meet Productions/Musikkoperatørene)
