= Kråkesølv =

Norwegian rock band

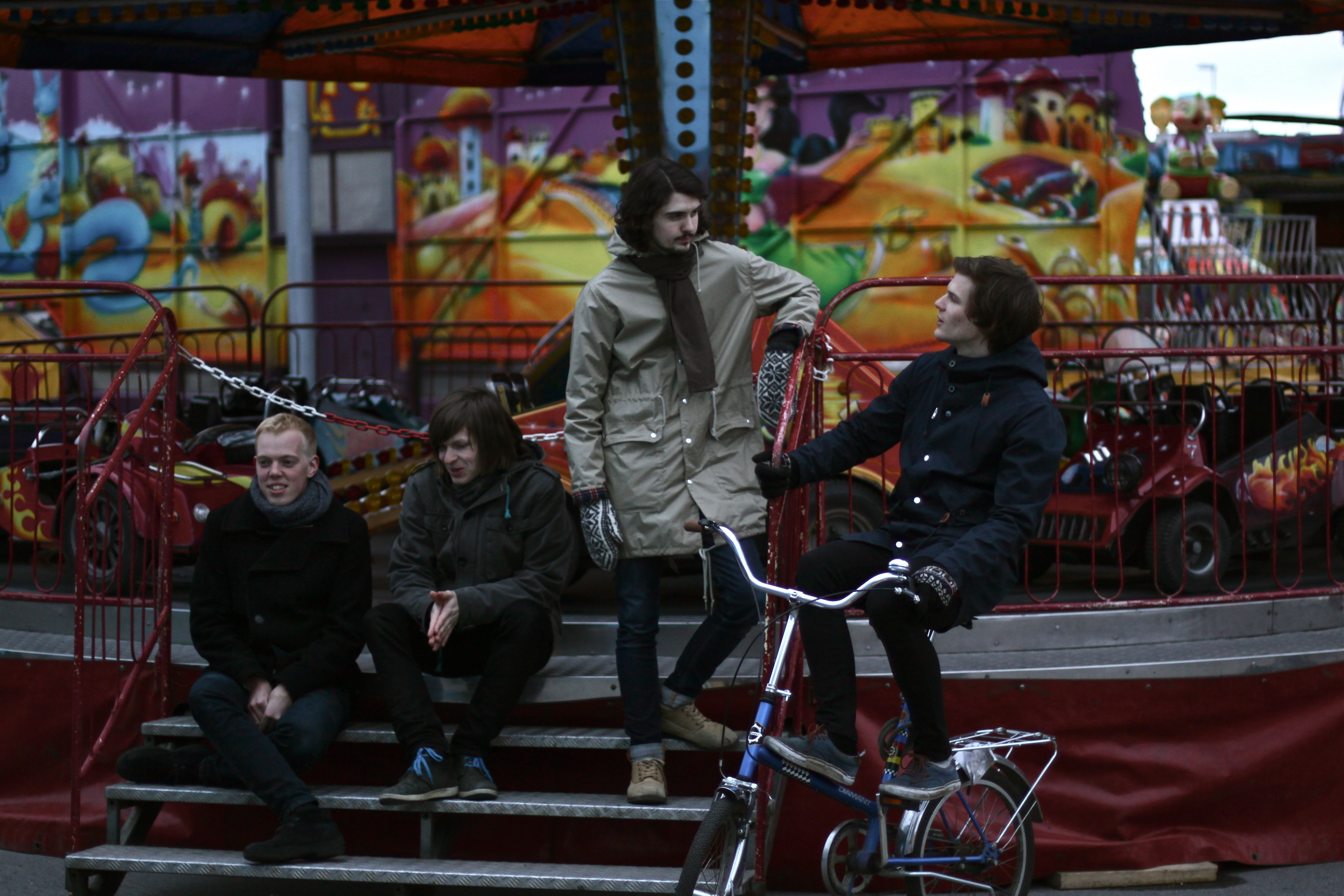
- Kråkesølv in 2012.

Background information
- Origin: Bodø, Norway
- Genres: Indie rock indie pop
- Years active: 2007-present
- Labels: Kråkesølv
- Members: Fredrik William Olsen; Petter Waldemar Nohr Unstad; Kristoffer Magnus Nohr Unstad; Jørgen Smådal Larsen
- Past members: Thomas Litangen
- Website: www.krakesolv.no

Kråkesølv (initiated in December 2007) is a rock band from Bodø Municipality in Norway. The name is taken from a tune by the hardcore band Hjertesorg (also from Bodø), in which Fredrik William Olsen and Thomas Litangen played.

== Biography ==
The band is based in Bodø and the members are linked to the musical scene connected to the culture house Kulturhuset Gimle and the Rock club X in Bodø.

Kråkesølv gave their first gig at Kulturhuset Gimle in Bodø 2008. The same year they recorded a three-track demo at Hunstad Kultursenter in Bodø, containing the tunes «Hell litervis med sand på timeglasset», «Hjørnebrikke» and «Blåe øya». The demo was put up for free download at Plysjbyen Death Metal Distribution and at the band MySpace site. The demo was later accepted by the label How is Annie Records and relaunched as a self-titled digital EP for free download.

The band was nationally known in Norway through the NRK P3 show Urørt and the music branch festival by:Larm. In November 2009 they released their first album Trådnøsting, a self release on their own label. The album was nominated for the 2009 Spellemannprisen in the categories Pop music and Newcomers. Together with John Olav Nilsen & Gjengen Kråkesølv was the most playing band in Norwegian festivals the summer of 2010.

In 2010 they won the demo competition given by the band Bigbang, and thus was given the opportunity to record their second album in Bigbangs Grand Sport Studio with Øystein Greni as producer. The album was titled Bomtur Til Jorda (2010) on the label Grand Sport Records. The band was awarded the 2010 Spellemannprisen in the category Pop music, for this album.

Kråkesølv has on several occasions drawn attention for their attitude towards the music industry, for example by posting the album Trådnøsting for free download at The Pirate Bay, and later to have declined nomination Statoil scholarships of NOK 800,000 at the by:Larm 2010, because the band did not want to be associated with "oil soiled money".

The third album Alle Gode Ting (2012), was followed by subsequent touring. In December 2012 the drummer Thomas Litangen was replaced by Jørgen Smådal Larsen (former drummer of the bands The Spectacle, Lukestar).

Kråkesølv released their fourth self-titled album Kråkesølv in 2014.

== Members ==
- Kristoffer Magnus Nohr Unstad – guitar, vocals
- Fredrik William Olsen – guitar, vocals
- Petter Waldemar Nohr Unstad – bass, vocals
- Jørgen Smådal Larsen – drums

Past Members

- Thomas Litangen – drums

== Honors ==
- 2010: Spellemannprisen in the category Pop music, for the album Bomtur Til Jorda

== Discography ==
Albums

- 2009: Trådnøsting (Kråkesølv/Diger)
- 2010: Bomtur Til Jorda (Kråkesølv/Grandsport)
- 2012: Alle Gode Ting (Kråkesølv)
- 2014: Kråkesølv (Jansen Plateproduksjon)
- 2016: Pangea (Jansen Plateproduksjon)
- 2020: Force majeure (Pott og Panne)

Awards
| Preceded by Montée | Recipient of the best Pop band Spellemannprisen; 2010 | Succeeded by Team Me |
