= Mercury – Acts 1 & 2 =

2022 studio album by Imagine Dragons

- The artwork for Mercury – Acts 1 & 2. Target exclusive artwork inverts the colors and Mercury – Act 2 artwork adds "Act 2" below "Mercury".

Studio album by Imagine Dragons
- Released: July 1, 2022
- Recorded: 2018–2022
- Length: 102:40; 44:57 (Act 1); 57:43 (Act 2)
- Labels: Kidinakorner; Interscope
- Producers: Imagine Dragons; Goldwiing; Mattman & Robin; Jason Suwito; Jayson DeZuzio; Joel Little; Brandon Darner; Styalz Fuego; New Haven; Jesse Shatkin; Dylan Wiggins; Mag; KillaGraham; Mick Coogan; Nicky Blitz; Rick Rubin

Imagine Dragons chronology
Mercury – Act 1 (2021)	Mercury – Acts 1 & 2 (2022)	Loom (2024)

Singles from Mercury – Acts 1 & 2
- 1. "Bones" Released: March 11, 2022; 2. "Sharks" Released: June 24, 2022; 3. "I Don't Like Myself" Released: October 10, 2022; 4. "Symphony" Released: November 7, 2022; 5. "Crushed" Released: May 10, 2023

Mercury – Acts 1 & 2 is the full fifth studio album by American pop rock band Imagine Dragons, released through Kidinakorner and Interscope Records. It is a double album consisting of 32 tracks, with the first half, Mercury – Act 1, released separately on September 3, 2021, and Mercury – Act 2, the second half, released on July 1, 2022, as part of Mercury – Acts 1 & 2. Act 2 was only released separately on vinyl.

The album was executive produced by Rick Rubin. It is the final Imagine Dragons album to feature long-time drummer Daniel Platzman, who would go on hiatus from the band in March 2023, and announce his permanent departure in August 2024.

== Background and concept ==
Imagine Dragons announced their fifth studio album, Mercury – Act 1 on June 30, 2021, revealing the cover art and release date. On September 2, 2021, the band performed in Brooklyn for a small group of people playing 5 songs, including the tracks "Easy Come Easy Go" "It's Ok" and "One Day". On November 19, 2021, the group released an Amazon Music-exclusive EP titled "Mercury - Act 1 (Amazon Music Live)", which included recordings of the 5 songs performed. The band released Mercury – Act 1 on September 3, 2021. Upon its release, the group confirmed that they would be releasing a sequel album. Frontman Dan Reynolds described the album as split into two sides: one organic and looking inward, the other more aggressive and looking outward. The album touches on themes of loss, loneliness, and grief, while celebrating life:

"I have watched my friends die to drug addiction. [...] The point of art is to share our darkest moments as well as the light ones. I believe that by singing about my own struggle with it, it hopefully will bring someone else some sort of peace or resolve. This record deals with a lot of searching and loneliness, struggling with the finite state of reality. However, I really wanted it to end on a celebratory note. Setting the foundation for a more steady and stable future. I wanted to end the record by focusing on all the things that make me happy. The simple things that keep me going every day. Looking to the future. Pointing out to myself all the beauty that surrounds me."

The album's name is derived from the word “mercurial”, drawing on Reynolds’ mental health struggles and the band's lack of specific genre classification. The band enlisted Rick Rubin as the album's executive producer, whom Reynolds credited with pushing him to be less metaphorical lyrically and embrace the more “uncomfortable” aspects of songs:

"Rick reminded me that over the last decade my fans have grown up with me. They not only want to grow with me, but they expected it. He told me to never worry about pushing them in uncomfortable ways. And that I really would be doing them a disservice if I ever tried to re-create the past or sugarcoat the present. I owe them vulnerability and honesty only."

The band stated that Rick Rubin would executive produce the album. In January 2022, Reynolds claimed the album was "almost done" and would likely be released following the first leg of the Mercury Tour. In an interview released through Apple Music in late March, Reynolds stated that the album was different sonically than their previous albums and said it was influenced by hip hop.

Reynolds, in an interview with Consequence, described the creative process behind the two albums:

We worked with Rick Rubin on these records, and we knew really early on that it was going to be two records. As we went through the songs on the first record, Rick sat me down and we really talked about the theme of it. We realized early on that Act I was focused on death and kind of those shell-shocked feelings that accompany that, whereas Act II is really post-grief and waking up the next day after you've lost someone that you loved.

— Dan Reynolds

== Singles and promotion ==
"Bones" was released as the lead single to Mercury – Act 2 on March 11, 2022. The song was used to promote the upcoming third season of the Amazon Prime Video series The Boys. The release of the song's music video on April 6 coincided with the pre-order of the album. Act 2's second single, "Sharks", was released on June 24, 2022, along with an accompanying music video. It was sent to Italian radio on July 1, 2022.

The third single, "I Don't Like Myself", was released on October 10, 2022, along with an accompanying music video for World Mental Health Day. For the occasion, the band partnered with Crisis Text Line for a fundraising campaign. "Symphony" was released as a single along with a visualizer video. was sent to radio in Italy on November 25, 2022, as the fourth single from the album.

"Crushed" was announced as the fifth single with a release date of May 10, 2023. An accompanying music video was released on the same date. The video was filmed in Ukraine and is in partnership with United24. "Waves" was sent to radio in Italy on May 19, 2023, as a promotional single, and got also its live debut on August 5, in Rome gig of their Mercury World Tour.

== Tour ==
Four days after the release of Mercury – Act 1, the band announced that they would embark on a 17-date North American tour, beginning in early February and stretching to March. Pre-sale access was given to American Express Card members on September 7 through September 9. Tickets went on-sale to the general public on September 10, 2021.

On September 2, 2021, the band performed in Brooklyn for a small group of people playing 5 songs, including the tracks "Easy Come Easy Go" "It's Ok" and "One Day". On November 19, 2021, the group released an Amazon Music-exclusive EP titled "Mercury - Act 1 (Amazon Music Live)", which included recordings of the 5 songs performed.

On November 1, 2021, European dates were announced. The European leg spanned 2 months and visited both festivals and stadiums. Tickets for the European leg went on-sale on November 5, 2021. American pop group LANY were initially announced as the opening act for the North American leg of the tour but were dropped shortly after, most likely due to allegations of predatory behavior resurfacing. On December 10, Imagine Dragons announced that Canadian-American singer Grandson and Danish singer MØ would serve as LANY's replacements.

On December 14, 2021, the band announced twelve Canadian tour dates with AVIV serving as the opening act.

On February 25, 2022, the band announced the cancellation of tour dates in Ukraine and Russia, due to the ongoing Russian invasion of Ukraine.

On March 25, 2022, the band announced a second North American leg of the tour, with Macklemore and Kings Elliot serving as opening acts. On April 6, the band announced that Mother Mother would serve as opening act for the European leg of the tour. On August 4, 2022, the band announced the shows of South American leg of the tour. However, on October 17, 2022, just one day before they were set to begin, the shows were postponed due to health issues with lead singer Dan Reynolds. The new dates, scheduled to take place in March 2023, were announced in November.

On November 25, 2022, Live Nation Entertainment announced an additional number of performances in Europe, extending the tour up to September 10, 2023.

On March 3, 2023, drummer Daniel Platzman announced that he would be absent from the South American leg of the Mercury Tour to focus on his health. That same day, he released his first single as a solo artist, titled "Show Me That You Want Me", accompanied with a music video. The band's former drummer and founding member Andrew Tolman sat in for Platzman during the tour and all other performances throughout 2023.

On March 24, 2023, the band announced AJR and Mother Mother as opening acts for their upcoming European leg of the tour in the summer of 2023.

On July 14, 2023, a concert film titled Imagine Dragons: Live in Vegas was released on Hulu. The film showcases the band's full concert at Allegiant Stadium in Las Vegas on September 10, 2022. A live album of the concert was released on July 28, 2023.

== Critical reception ==
Professional ratings
Review scores
Source	Rating
AllMusic	(Acts 1 & 2) (Act 2)
The Arts Desk	2/5 stars
Rolling Stone	3/5 stars
The Telegraph	2/5 stars

Neil Z. Yeung of AllMusic was critical of Act 2's unfocused nature and length, stating, "There's simply too much going on and not enough editorial trimming to make this as impactful an experience as Act 1."

Reviewing Act 2, Ali Shutler of The Telegraph was unenthusiastic of the more downtempo songs, claiming they "all trudge towards the same big, emotional finale that's less impactful every time and quickly sucks the joy from the record." Shutler also deemed it forgettable, stating, "In a bid to appeal to everyone, the band have removed anything that would make them stand out. There's no doubt you'll hear Imagine Dragons' music everywhere over the next few months, but you'll be hard pushed to remember it."

== Track listing ==
All tracks are written by Dan Reynolds, Wayne Sermon, Ben McKee, and Daniel Platzman. Additional writers are included below.

Mercury – Act 1 track listing
No.	Title	Writer(s)	Producer(s)	Length
1.	"Enemy" (with JID)	Robin Fredriksson; Mattias Larsson; Justin Tranter; Destin Route	Mattman & Robin	2:53
2.	"My Life"	Fredriksson; Larsson; Tranter	Mattman & Robin; Brandon Darner	3:45
3.	"Lonely"	Fredriksson; Larsson; Tranter	Mattman & Robin	2:40
4.	"Wrecked"		Imagine Dragons	4:04
5.	"Monday"	Andrew Tolman	Imagine Dragons; Goldwiing	3:08
6.	"#1"	Kaelyn Behr; Mark Benedicto	Styalz Fuego; New Haven	3:25
7.	"Easy Come Easy Go"	Jayson DeZuzio	DeZuzio	3:00
8.	"Giants"	Tolman	Goldwiing	3:30
9.	"It's OK"	Tolman	Imagine Dragons; Goldwiing	3:23
10.	"Dull Knives"	Aja Volkman	Imagine Dragons	3:34
11.	"Follow You"	Elley Duhé; Fran Hall; Joel Little	Little	2:56
12.	"Cutthroat"		Imagine Dragons; Rick Rubin	2:50
13.	"No Time for Toxic People"	Jason Suwito	Suwito	3:28
14.	"One Day"	Jesse Shatkin; Dylan Wiggins	Shatkin; Wiggins	2:31
Total length:				44:57

Mercury – Act 2 track listing
No.	Title	Writer(s)	Producer(s)	Length
1.	"Bones"	Fredriksson; Larsson	Mattman & Robin	2:45
2.	"Symphony"	Little; Talay Riley; Adio Marchant	Little	2:56
3.	"Sharks"	Fredriksson; Larsson	Mattman & Robin	3:11
4.	"I Don't Like Myself"	Marco Borrero	Mag	3:06
5.	"Blur"	Graham Andrew Muron; Mick Coogan; Nick Scapa	KillaGraham; Coogan; Nicky Blitz	2:56
6.	"Higher Ground"	Tolman	Goldwiing	2:42
7.	"Crushed"		Imagine Dragons	3:09
8.	"Take It Easy"		Imagine Dragons	2:38
9.	"Waves"	Fredriksson; Larsson; Tranter	Mattman & Robin	3:45
10.	"I'm Happy"	Tolman	Goldwiing	3:05
11.	"Ferris Wheel"		Imagine Dragons	3:24
12.	"Peace of Mind"	Suwito	Suwito	2:54
13.	"Sirens"	DeZuzio	DeZuzio	2:35
14.	"Tied"		Imagine Dragons	4:02
15.	"Younger"	Tolman	Goldwiing	3:12
16.	"I Wish"		Imagine Dragons	3:27
17.	"Continual" (featuring Cory Henry)	Henry	Rubin	3:50
18.	"They Don't Know You Like I Do"	Tolman	Imagine Dragons; Goldwiing	4:18
Total length:				57:43

Notes

- The originally released standard version of Mercury – Act 1 does not include "Enemy". The song was added onto the album as an additional track on digital retailers and streaming platforms.
- "I Wish" appears on digital and streaming versions, as well as Japanese and Target Exclusive CD versions of Mercury – Acts 1 & 2, but is omitted from the standard physical version. It is also featured on the standalone vinyl versions of Mercury – Act 2.
- The Japanese edition of Mercury – Act 1 features the bonus track "Follow You (Summer '21 Version)", produced by Brandon Darner.
- The Japanese edition of Mercury – Acts 1 & 2 features acoustic versions of "Believer" and "Follow You", a live rendition of "Wrecked" (dubbed 'From The Bunker'), a solo mix of "Enemy" with a new verse from Dan Reynolds instead of JID, and a live rendition of "Bones" performed at the Climate Pledge Arena.

== Personnel ==
Imagine Dragons

- Dan Reynolds
- Wayne Sermon
- Ben McKee
- Daniel Platzman

== Charts ==
=== Weekly charts ===
Weekly chart performance for Mercury – Acts 1 & 2
Chart (2022–2023)	Peak position
Australian Albums (ARIA)	13
Austrian Albums (Ö3 Austria)	3
Belgian Albums (Ultratop Flanders)	7
Belgian Albums (Ultratop Wallonia)	4
Belgian Albums (Ultratop Wallonia) Mercury – Act 2	110
Czech Albums (ČNS IFPI)	35
Dutch Albums (Album Top 100)	4
Finnish Albums (Suomen virallinen lista)	50
French Albums (SNEP)	4
German Albums (Offizielle Top 100)	6
Hungarian Albums (MAHASZ)	13
Italian Albums (FIMI)	7
Lithuanian Albums (AGATA)	14
New Zealand Albums (RMNZ)	25
Norwegian Albums (VG-lista)	7
Polish Albums (ZPAV)	4
Portuguese Albums (AFP)	12
Swiss Albums (Schweizer Hitparade)	1

=== Year-end charts ===
2022 year-end chart performance for Mercury – Acts 1 & 2
Chart (2022)	Position
Belgian Albums (Ultratop Wallonia)	106
Lithuanian Albums (AGATA)	95
Polish Albums (ZPAV)	55
Swiss Albums (Schweizer Hitparade)	23

2023 year-end chart performance for Mercury – Acts 1 & 2
Chart (2023)	Position
Belgian Albums (Ultratop Flanders)	131
Belgian Albums (Ultratop Wallonia)	53
Hungarian Albums (MAHASZ)	57
Italian Albums (FIMI)	72
Polish Albums (ZPAV)	88
Swiss Albums (Schweizer Hitparade)	42

2024 year-end chart performance for Mercury – Acts 1 & 2
Chart (2024)	Position
Hungarian Albums (MAHASZ)	93
Swiss Albums (Schweizer Hitparade)	94

2025 year-end chart performance for Mercury – Acts 1 & 2
Chart (2025)	Position
Belgian Albums (Ultratop Wallonia)	151

== Certifications ==
Certifications for Mercury – Acts 1 & 2
Region	Certification	Certified units/sales
Denmark (IFPI Danmark)	Gold	10,000^{‡}
France (SNEP)	3× Platinum	300,000^{‡}
Mexico (AMPROFON)	2× Platinum+Gold	350,000^{‡}
New Zealand (RMNZ)	Platinum	15,000^{‡}
Poland (ZPAV)	Diamond	100,000^{‡}
United States (RIAA)	Platinum	1,000,000^{‡}
^{‡} Sales+streaming figures based on certification alone.

== Release history ==
Release history for Mercury – Acts 1 & 2
Region	Date	Format	Version	Label
Various	July 1, 2022	2-CD; digital download; streaming	Deluxe; Target exclusive	Kidinakorner; Interscope
Various	July 1, 2022	2-CD	Standard	Kidinakorner; Interscope
Japan	July 1, 2022	2-CD	Japanese exclusive	Universal Music Japan
