= Symphony (Imagine Dragons song) =

2022 song by Imagine Dragons

- Symphony (Inner City Youth Orchestra of Los Angeles Version) cover art

Single by Imagine Dragons

from the album Mercury – Acts 1 & 2
- Released: November 7, 2022
- Length: 2:56
- Label: Kidinakorner; Interscope
- Songwriters: Dan Reynolds; Wayne Sermon; Ben McKee; Daniel Platzman; Joel Little; Adio Marchant; Talay Riley
- Producer: Little

Imagine Dragons singles chronology
"I Don't Like Myself" (2022)	"Symphony" (2022)	"Crushed" (2023)

Music video
- "Symphony" on YouTube

"Symphony" is a song by American pop rock band Imagine Dragons. The song was released through Kidinakorner and Interscope on November 7, 2022, as the fourth single from the band's fifth studio album, Mercury – Acts 1 & 2. The song was most successful in French radio and released on the same day as the visualizer video. The song was sent to Italian radio on November 25. An alternate version of the song was released with the Inner City Youth Orchestra of Los Angeles and Coke Studio on June 23, 2023.

== Background and composition ==
"Symphony" was written by band members Dan Reynolds, Wayne Sermon, Ben McKee, Daniel Platzman as well as Joel Little, Adio Marchant, and Talay Riley and produced by Little. Reynolds was nervous to preview the song to Mercury – Acts 1 & 2's executive producer Rick Rubin as it was the "poppiest" and "slickest" song on the album. Rubin, however, enjoyed the song, and was placed as the second song on Mercury – Act 2. The song's lyrics describe the harmonious relationship between two lovers and contains many reference and inclusions of different musical instruments throughout the song like the timpanis, xylophone, trumpet, and flute.

== Visualizer video ==
The visualizer video for "Symphony" was released on November 7, 2022, and was shot and directed by Matt Eastin. The video features various clips of the band performing during the Mercury World Tour overlaid with a purple hue and special effects of rings, circles, and other shapes.

== Personnel ==
Credits for "Symphony" adapted from Apple Music.

Musicians
- Dan Reynolds – lead vocals
- Wayne Sermon – guitar
- Ben McKee – bass guitar
- Daniel Platzman – drums
Production
- Rick Rubin – executive production
- Joel Little – production, recording engineering
- Serban Ghenea – mixing
- Randy Merrill – mastering
- John Hanes – recording engineering

== Charts ==
Chart performance for "Symphony"
Chart (2022–2023)	Peak position
France (SNEP)	41
Hungary (Rádiós Top 40)	4
San Marino (SMRRTV Top 50)	4
Slovakia Airplay (ČNS IFPI)	1
Turkey (Radiomonitor Türkiye)	10

== Certifications ==
Certifications for "Symphony"
Region	Certification	Certified units/sales
France (SNEP)	Platinum	200,000^{‡}
^{‡} Sales+streaming figures based on certification alone.
