= I Don't Like Myself =

2022 song by Imagine Dragons

Single by Imagine Dragons

from the album Mercury – Acts 1 & 2
- Released: October 10, 2022
- Length: 3:06
- Label: Kidinakorner; Interscope
- Songwriters: Dan Reynolds; Wayne Sermon; Ben McKee; Daniel Platzman; Marco Daniel Borrero
- Producer: MAG

Imagine Dragons singles chronology
"Sharks" (2022)	"I Don't Like Myself" (2022)	"Symphony" (2022)

Music video
- "I Don't Like Myself" on YouTube

"I Don't Like Myself" is a song by American pop rock band Imagine Dragons. The song was released through Kidinakorner and Interscope on October 10, 2022, as the third single from the band's fifth studio album, Mercury – Acts 1 & 2. It was released as a single in promotion of World Mental Health Day.

== Background and composition ==
"I Don't Like Myself" was written by band members Dan Reynolds, Wayne Sermon, Ben McKee, Daniel Platzman as well as Marco Daniel Borrero. It was also produced by Borrero under the alias MAG. The song was close to being removed off of Mercury - Act 2 as lead singer Reynolds no longer agreed with his lyrics of self-hatred and its sentiment. Sermon, however, wanted to include it as the song showed Reynolds' growth and was truthful to him when he wrote it. In a statement, Reynolds described the specific background of the song:

I wrote this song at a very low point for me. I struggled quite a bit with self-love over the years. I was in a deep rut of depression and turned to music for refuge. I’ve since spent many years in therapy working on self-love. I believe therapy is the reason I am still alive today. If it’s ever a question of whether or not you should go to therapy. The answer is always yes. Stay alive.

— Dan Reynolds

== Music video ==
The music video for "I Don't Like Myself" was released October 10, 2022 and was directed by Matt Eastin. The video features various clips of Dan Reynolds in a black hat and "Enemy" sweatshirt walking through various European cities while singing to the song. The video is also intermittent with clips of Reynolds performing on the Mercury World Tour. It was filmed during the European Leg of the tour. In the description of the video, a phone number for the Crisis Text Line was included.

== Personnel ==
Credits for "I Don't Like Myself" adapted from Apple Music.

Musicians
- Dan Reynolds – lead vocals
- Wayne Sermon – guitar
- Ben McKee – bass guitar
- Daniel Platzman – drums
Production
- Rick Rubin – executive production
- MAG – production
- Serban Ghenea – mixing
- Randy Merrill – mastering
- John Hanes – recording engineering

== Charts ==
Chart performance for "I Don't Like Myself"
Chart (2022)	Peak position
New Zealand Hot Singles (RMNZ)	20
US Hot Rock & Alternative Songs (Billboard)	48
