= Crushed (Imagine Dragons song) =

2023 song by Imagine Dragons

Single by Imagine Dragons

from the album Mercury – Acts 1 & 2
- Released: May 10, 2023
- Length: 3:09
- Label: Kidinakorner; Interscope
- Songwriters: Dan Reynolds; Wayne Sermon; Ben McKee; Daniel Platzman
- Producer: Imagine Dragons

Imagine Dragons singles chronology
"Symphony" (2022)	"Crushed" (2023)	"Children of the Sky" (2023)

Music video
- "Crushed" on YouTube

"Crushed" is a song by American pop rock band Imagine Dragons. The song was released through Kidinakorner and Interscope on May 10, 2023, as the fifth and final single from the band's fifth studio album, Mercury – Acts 1 & 2. The song was released as a single in promotion of United24 and support for Ukraine in the Russian invasion of Ukraine. The song was also nominated for MTV Video Music Award for Best Video with a Social Message at the 2023 MTV Video Music Awards.

== Background and composition ==
"Crushed" was written by band members Dan Reynolds, Wayne Sermon, Ben McKee, Daniel Platzman as well as produced by the band. The song's lyrics describe someone who is always crushed or trapped by the expectations of others into being someone she is not. The song uses this theme to reference to Nathaniel Hawthorne's "The Scarlet Letter" with the lyrics "Don't you know / That you don't have a say? / And the scarlet "A" on your neck / So pretty in red". The song's deep and low guitar is similar to early Radiohead songs. It originally began in Platzman's dome studio and evolved from there with Reynolds' deeply personal lyrics.

== Music video ==
The music video for "Crushed" was released on May 10, 2023, and was directed by Ty Arnold and produced by Arnold, Roman Ostrovskyi, and Igor Shcherbyna. The video follows the story of 14-year-old Ukrainian Sasha and features clips of him walking through his home village of Novohryhorivka in the Mykolaiv Oblast, which had been under Russian occupation for five consecutive months. The video shows houses and buildings destroyed by occupation and urges viewers to donate to United24. Sasha was invited to an Imagine Dragons concert to show support and unfurl the Ukrainian flag in Warsaw, Poland in August 2023.

== Personnel ==
Credits for "Crushed" adapted from Apple Music.

Musicians
- Dan Reynolds – lead vocals
- Wayne Sermon – guitar
- Ben McKee – bass guitar
- Daniel Platzman – drums
Production
- Rick Rubin – executive production
- Imagine Dragons – production
- Serban Ghenea – mixing
- Randy Merrill – mastering
- Matthew Sedivy – recording engineer
- John Hanes – recording engineering
