= Bones (Imagine Dragons song) =

Single by Imagine Dragons

from the album Mercury – Acts 1 & 2
- Released: March 11, 2022
- Genre: Rock
- Length: 2:45
- Label: Interscope; Kidinakorner
- Songwriters: Dan Reynolds; Wayne Sermon; Ben McKee; Daniel Platzman; Robin Fredriksson; Mattias Larsson
- Producer: Mattman & Robin

Imagine Dragons singles chronology
"Enemy" (2021)	"Bones" (2022)	"Sharks" (2022)

Music video
- "Bones" on YouTube

"Bones" is a song by American pop rock band Imagine Dragons. The song was released through Interscope and Kidinakorner on March 11, 2022, as the lead single from the band's fifth studio album, Mercury – Acts 1 & 2. It was written by Dan Reynolds, Wayne Sermon, Ben McKee, Daniel Platzman, and its producers Mattman & Robin.

== Background and release ==
On March 9, 2022, the band posted to their social media, asking fans to head over to their official Discord server at 3:00PST for a surprise. The band's manager and frontman Dan Reynolds' brother, Mac, sent a WAV file containing the first 13 seconds of "Bones". The next day, the band announced on TikTok that the song would be released on March 11. The day afterward, the song was featured in the teaser for the third season of the Amazon Prime Video series, The Boys.

Upon the song's release, Reynolds stated to Rolling Stone, "'Bones' is a reflection of my constant obsession with the finality and fragility of my bone. I'm always in search of some evidence that will convince me that there is more to come—that life is truly eternal in some sense. Having yet to find that, I try to at least dream of what conquering death would feel like in a song." The song plays on a loop in the main menu of the mobile game MLB Perfect Inning 24 with cover star Corey Seager, following "Believer" playing in the 2023 edition.

== Composition ==
Musically, Emily Zemler of Rolling Stone described "Bones" as a "mid-tempo rock-heavy track".

== Music video ==
On April 6, 2022, the band released an official music video for the song, directed by Jason Koenig. The video draws influences from The Wolf of Wall Street and Michael Jackson's "Thriller" music video. The video stars frontman Dan Reynolds as an egoistic Wall Street day trader, while the other band members star as coworkers. However, all the workers suddenly turn into dancing zombies, who chase Reynolds around the office. Reynolds is then hypnotized into joining the zombies' dance performance, before the spell breaks, he gets caught, and is decapitated.

== Charts ==
=== Weekly charts ===
Weekly chart performance for "Bones"
Chart (2022–2025)	Peak position
Australia (ARIA)	43
Austria (Ö3 Austria Top 40)	30
Belarus Airplay (TopHit)	8
Belgium (Ultratop 50 Flanders)	18
Belgium (Ultratop 50 Wallonia)	18
Canada Hot 100 (Billboard)	48
Canada CHR/Top 40 (Billboard)	37
CIS Airplay (TopHit)	2
Czech Republic Airplay (ČNS IFPI)	2
Czech Republic Singles Digital (ČNS IFPI)	6
Estonia Airplay (TopHit)	43
France (SNEP)	24
Germany (GfK)	48
Global 200 (Billboard)	32
Greece International (IFPI)	37
Hungary (Rádiós Top 40)	8
Hungary (Single Top 40)	12
Hungary (Stream Top 40)	17
Ireland (IRMA)	37
Italy (FIMI)	39
Kazakhstan Airplay (TopHit)	77
Lithuania (AGATA)	18
Mexico Ingles Airplay (Billboard)	1
Netherlands (Dutch Top 40)	14
Netherlands (Single Top 100)	45
New Zealand Hot Singles (RMNZ)	6
Poland (Polish Airplay Top 100)	5
Poland (Polish Streaming Top 100)	76
Portugal (AFP)	26
Romania Airplay (TopHit)	167
Russia Airplay (TopHit)	2
San Marino Airplay (SMRTV Top 50)	9
Slovakia Airplay (ČNS IFPI)	3
Slovakia Singles Digital (ČNS IFPI)	5
South Africa (RISA)	72
Sweden (Sverigetopplistan)	90
Switzerland (Schweizer Hitparade)	11
Ukraine Airplay (TopHit)	3
UK Singles (OCC)	51
US Billboard Hot 100	47
US Adult Contemporary (Billboard)	20
US Adult Pop Airplay (Billboard)	10
US Hot Rock & Alternative Songs (Billboard)	6
US Pop Airplay (Billboard)	21
US Rock & Alternative Airplay (Billboard)	10
Vietnam (Vietnam Hot 100)	36

=== Monthly charts ===
Monthly chart performance for "Bones"
Chart (2022)	Peak position
Russia Airplay (TopHit)	3

=== Year-end charts ===
2022 year-end chart performance for "Bones"
Chart (2022)	Position
Belgium (Ultratop Flanders)	41
Belgium (Ultratop Wallonia)	63
France (SNEP)	64
Global 200 (Billboard)	76
Hungary (Rádiós Top 40)	91
Hungary (Stream Top 40)	45
Italy (FIMI)	86
Lithuania (AGATA)	52
Netherlands (Dutch Top 40)	71
Poland (ZPAV)	77
Russia Airplay (TopHit)	6
Switzerland (Schweizer Hitparade)	28
Ukraine Airplay (TopHit)	46
US Adult Top 40 (Billboard)	32
US Hot Rock & Alternative Songs (Billboard)	12
US Rock Airplay (Billboard)	30

2023 year-end chart performance for "Bones"
Chart (2023)	Position
Global 200 (Billboard)	55
Hungary (Rádiós Top 40)	12
Russia Airplay (TopHit)	106
Ukraine Airplay (TopHit)	68
US Hot Rock & Alternative Songs (Billboard)	35

2024 year-end chart performance for "Bones"
Chart (2024)	Position
Belarus Airplay (TopHit)	89
CIS Airplay (TopHit)	141
Hungary (Rádiós Top 40)	43

2025 year-end chart performance for "Bones"
Chart (2025)	Position
Belarus Airplay (TopHit)	75
Hungary (Rádiós Top 40)	37

== Certifications ==
Certifications for "Bones"
Region	Certification	Certified units/sales
Australia (ARIA)	Gold	35,000^{‡}
Belgium (BRMA)	Platinum	40,000^{‡}
Brazil (Pro-Música Brasil)	Diamond	160,000^{‡}
Canada (Music Canada)	3× Platinum	240,000^{‡}
Denmark (IFPI Danmark)	Gold	45,000^{‡}
France (SNEP)	Diamond	333,333^{‡}
Germany (BVMI)	Gold	200,000^{‡}
Italy (FIMI)	2× Platinum	200,000^{‡}
Mexico (AMPROFON)	Diamond	700,000^{‡}
New Zealand (RMNZ)	2× Platinum	60,000^{‡}
Poland (ZPAV)	4× Platinum	200,000^{‡}
Portugal (AFP)	2× Platinum	20,000^{‡}
Spain (PROMUSICAE)	Platinum	60,000^{‡}
United Kingdom (BPI)	Platinum	600,000^{‡}
United States (RIAA)	2× Platinum	2,000,000^{‡}
Streaming
Central America (CFC)	2× Platinum	14,000,000^{†}
Greece (IFPI Greece)	Platinum	2,000,000^{†}
^{‡} Sales+streaming figures based on certification alone.^{†} Streaming-only figures based on certification alone.

== Release history ==
Release history and formats for "Bones"
Region	Date	Format	Label	Ref.
Various	March 11, 2022	Digital download; streaming	Kidinakorner; Interscope	
United States	April 5, 2022	Alternative radio	Interscope	
United States	June 7, 2022	Contemporary hit radio	Kidinakorner; Interscope	
