= Mercury – Act 1 =

Studio album by Imagine Dragons
- Released: September 3, 2021
- Recorded: 2018–2021
- Studios: Ragged Insomnia Studio (Las Vegas); Shangri-La (Malibu); Platzcaster West (Las Vegas); Wolf Cousins (Stockholm); Golden Age (Los Angeles); The Clubhouse (New Zealand); Noise Coalition (Costa Mesa); The Bibcage (Los Angeles); The Base (South Melbourne)
- Length: 42:04
- Labels: Kidinakorner; Interscope
- Producers: Mattman & Robin; Brandon Darner; Goldwiing; Styalz Fuego; New Haven; Jayson DeZuzio; Joel Little; Jason Suwito; Jesse Shatkin; Dylan Wiggins; Imagine Dragons; Rick Rubin

Imagine Dragons chronology
Origins (2018)	Mercury – Act 1 (2021)	Mercury – Acts 1 & 2 (2022)

Singles from Mercury – Act 1
- 1. "Follow You" / "Cutthroat" Released: March 12, 2021; 2. "Wrecked" Released: July 2, 2021; 3. "Monday" Released: September 24, 2021; 4. "Enemy" Released: October 28, 2021

Mercury – Act 1 is the first half of the fifth studio album by American pop rock band Imagine Dragons, released on September 3, 2021, by Kidinakorner and Interscope Records in the United States. Imagine Dragons recorded the album in 2018 after their previous album, Origins. It was later modified in early 2022 to include "Enemy", from the Arcane League of Legends soundtrack. The album was executive produced by Rick Rubin, who also executive produced its successor Mercury – Acts 1 & 2, released on July 1, 2022, which Act 1 was included as part of.

== Background ==
Following the conclusion of their Evolve World Tour in 2018, Imagine Dragons' fourth studio album Origins was released that November. Unlike their previous albums, the band did not tour in promotion of Origins, instead opting to take time off to decompress and spend time with family.

The album was announced on June 30, 2021, revealing the cover art and release date.

On September 2, 2021, the band performed in Brooklyn for a small group of people playing 5 songs, including the tracks "Easy Come Easy Go" "It's Ok" and "One Day". On November 19, 2021, the group released an Amazon Music-exclusive EP titled "Mercury - Act 1 (Amazon Music Live)", which included recordings of the 5 songs performed.

== Concept ==
Frontman Dan Reynolds described the album as split into two sides: one organic and looking inward, the other more aggressive and looking outward. The album touches on themes of loss, loneliness, and grief, while celebrating life:

"I have watched my friends die to drug addiction. [...] The point of art is to share our darkest moments as well as the light ones. I believe that by singing about my own struggle with it, it hopefully will bring someone else some sort of peace or resolve. This record deals with a lot of searching and loneliness, struggling with the finite state of reality. However, I really wanted it to end on a celebratory note. Setting the foundation for a more steady and stable future. I wanted to end the record by focusing on all the things that make me happy. The simple things that keep me going every day. Looking to the future. Pointing out to myself all the beauty that surrounds me."

The album's name is derived from the word “mercurial”, drawing on Reynolds’ mental health struggles and the band's lack of specific genre classification. The band enlisted Rick Rubin as the album's executive producer, whom Reynolds credited with pushing him to be less metaphorical lyrically and embrace the more “uncomfortable” aspects of songs:

"Rick reminded me that over the last decade my fans have grown up with me. They not only want to grow with me, but they expected it. He told me to never worry about pushing them in uncomfortable ways. And that I really would be doing them a disservice if I ever tried to re-create the past or sugarcoat the present. I owe them vulnerability and honesty only."

== Critical reception ==
Professional ratings
Review scores
Source	Rating
AllMusic	3.5/5 stars
Evening Standard	2/5 stars
NME	2/5 stars
Pitchfork	4.4/10
Riff Magazine	7/10

The album was met with mixed reviews. The more positive reviews praised the album's maturity, calling it the band's best album since their debut, Night Visions. Other negative reviews criticized the band's attempts to mix too many genres.

Neil Z. Yeung of AllMusic stated "While the overall tone and narrative could use a little polishing, Mercury: Act 1 is a huge step forward in their maturation process". Conversely Evan Rytlewski of Pitchfork, was hard-pressed to find signs of maturity and unimpressed by the band’s "genre hopping". He concluded that "despite the ostensibly humanizing presence of Rick Rubin, rock's patron saint of prestige, these quintessentially Vegas showmen still sound like they're firing their emotions out of a T-shirt cannon."

El Hunt of NME gave the album two stars pointing out its lack of cohesion and originality. David Smyth of Evening Standard called the album "more irritating than inspiring" and stated that "there are a few songs you might like here, but a few you'll violently hate."

== Promotion ==
After the band's break in 2019 - 2020 on March 3, 2021, the band published a photo of them in a studio recording on official accounts. On March 5, the band published a video of cassette with a mystery melody. The next 3 days they published four videos with anagrams. When the fans solved the riddles, Imagine Dragons confirmed that the double single "Follow You + Cutthroat" would be released on March 12, 2021. On March 23, the band performed for "Follow You" for the first time on The Late Show, and later on The Ellen Show on May 24, 2021. On June 29, the band published a snippet of the second single titled "Wrecked", which was later released on July 2. On June 30, the band announced the release of Mercury - Act 1. On September 2, 2021, the band performed on Amazon Music Live for a small group. On 19 November 2021, the group released an Amazon Music-exclusive EP titled Mercury - Act 1 (Amazon Music Live). On September 7, the band performed "Wrecked" on Jimmy Kimmel Live.

=== World tour ===
On 7 September 2021, after the release of Mercury - Act 1, Imagine Dragons officially announced the Mercury Tour in 2022 to promote the album. The band had not toured for their previous album, Origins, as they had decided to take a break. The tour began on February 6, 2022 in Miami, Florida and is scheduled to conclude on September 10, 2023 in Berlin.

=== Singles ===
The lead single for Mercury – Act 1 was a double-A-side with the songs "Follow You" and "Cutthroat"; the songs were released on March 12, 2021. The music video for "Follow You" came out on March 16, 2021 and "Cutthroat"'s music video came out on May 5, 2021. The second single "Wrecked", which was inspired by the death of Reynolds' sister-in-law, was released on July 2, 2021 and the music video was released on July 15, 2021. The music video for "Monday" was released on September 24, 2021. The song was the band's first to feature contributions from former drummer Andrew Tolman since their debut album Night Visions in 2012. "Lonely" was sent to Italian radio as a promotional single on the same day.

"Enemy" (with rapper JID) was released on October 28, 2021, and was featured on the soundtrack to the Netflix animated series Arcane. The song became JID's first song to reach the top 5 in the US, and became the band's first song to reach the top 5 since the 2017 song "Thunder". In 2023, for the 35th anniversary of Alternative Airplay – where "Enemy" charted for 54 weeks, of which 9 were spent at the top spot – Billboard ranked the song as the 14th-most successful in the chart's history. An accompanying animated video was released alongside the song, and produced by Riot Games and Fortiche Production. It features the League of Legends character Jinx in a story about "the parts of her childhood that led her to a life of crime" and several scenes of "the falling out between Jinx and her sister Vi".

== Track listing ==
All tracks are written by Dan Reynolds, Wayne Sermon, Ben McKee, and Daniel Platzman. Additional writers are included below.

Mercury – Act 1 track listing
No.	Title	Writer(s)	Producer(s)	Length
1.	"My Life"	Robin Fredriksson; Mattias Larsson; Justin Tranter	Mattman & Robin; Brandon Darner	3:45
2.	"Lonely"	Fredriksson; Larsson; Tranter	Mattman & Robin	2:40
3.	"Wrecked"		Imagine Dragons	4:04
4.	"Monday"	Andrew Tolman	Imagine Dragons; Goldwiing	3:08
5.	"#1"	Kaelyn Behr; Mark Benedicto	Styalz Fuego; New Haven	3:25
6.	"Easy Come Easy Go"	Jayson DeZuzio	DeZuzio	3:00
7.	"Giants"	Tolman	Goldwiing	3:30
8.	"It's Ok"	Tolman	Imagine Dragons; Goldwiing	3:23
9.	"Dull Knives"	Aja Volkman	Imagine Dragons	3:34
10.	"Follow You"	Elley Duhé; Fran Hall; Joel Little	Little	2:56
11.	"Cutthroat"		Imagine Dragons; Rick Rubin	2:50
12.	"No Time for Toxic People"	Jason Suwito	Suwito	3:28
13.	"One Day"	Jesse Shatkin; Dylan Wiggins	Shatkin; Wiggins	2:31
Total length:				42:04

Additional track version
No.	Title	Writer(s)	Producer(s)	Length
1.	"Enemy" (with JID)	Fredriksson; Larsson; Tranter; Destin Route	Mattman & Robin	2:53
Total length:				44:57

Japanese bonus track
No.	Title	Writer(s)	Producer(s)	Length
14.	"Follow You" (Summer '21 version)	Duhé; Hall; Little	Darner	2:52
Total length:				44:56

== Personnel ==
Some credits below were taken from the official photobook of the band in physical versions

Imagine Dragons

- Dan Reynolds – performing, production, composition, programming
- Wayne Sermon – performance, production, composition, mixing ("Dull Knives"), programming
- Ben McKee – performance, production, composition
- Daniel Platzman – performance, production, composition

Production

- Rick Rubin – executive producer, production
- Dylan Neustadter – engineering
- Jason Lader – engineering
- Jesse Shatkin – production, composition, engineering
- Joel Little – production, composition, engineering
- Jonathan Pfarr – engineering
- Matthew Sedivy – engineering
- Mattman & Robin – production, composition, engineering
- Micah Natera – engineering
- Samuel Dent – engineering
- Brandon Darner – production
- Justin Tranter – composition
- Andrew Tolman (Goldwiing) – production, composition
- Kaelyn Behr (Styalz Fuego) – production, composition
- Mark Benedicto (New Haven) – production, composition
- Jayson DeZuzio – production, composition
- Aja Volkman – composition
- Elley Duhé – composition
- Fran Hall – composition
- Jason Suwito – production, composition
- Dylan Wiggins – production, composition
- John Hanes – engineering
- Randy Merrill – mastering
- Serban Ghenea – mixing all song except "Dull Knives"

Art Direction and Design

- Matt Maitland - Big Active, London
- Band Photography - Neil Krug

== Commercial performance ==
Mercury – Act 1 debuted at No. 9 on Billboard 200 with 31,000 equivalent album units (17,000 pure), becoming their fifth top ten album in the US. The album also debuted within the top five across several Billboard charts: Top Rock Albums (No. 2), Alternative Albums (No. 2), Top Album Sales (No. 4) and Top Current Album Sales (No. 4).

== Charts ==
=== Weekly charts ===
Chart performance for Mercury – Act 1
Chart (2021–2022)	Peak position
Australian Albums (ARIA)	10
Austrian Albums (Ö3 Austria)	5
Belgian Albums (Ultratop Flanders)	10
Belgian Albums (Ultratop Wallonia)	4
Canadian Albums (Billboard)	4
Czech Albums (ČNS IFPI)	1
Danish Albums (Hitlisten)	37
Dutch Albums (Album Top 100)	6
Finnish Albums (Suomen virallinen lista)	20
French Albums (SNEP)	4
German Albums (Offizielle Top 100)	5
Hungarian Albums (MAHASZ)	39
Irish Albums (Official Charts)	26
Italian Albums (FIMI)	8
Japan Hot Albums (Billboard Japan)	70
Japanese Albums (Oricon)	116
Lithuanian Albums (AGATA)	18
New Zealand Albums (RMNZ)	11
Norwegian Albums (VG-lista)	9
Polish Albums (ZPAV)	8
Portuguese Albums (AFP)	4
Scottish Albums (Official Charts)	6
Spanish Albums (Promusicae)	6
Swedish Albums (Sverigetopplistan)	17
Swiss Albums (Schweizer Hitparade)	4
UK Albums (Official Charts)	7
US Billboard 200	9
US Top Alternative Albums (Billboard)	1
US Top Rock Albums (Billboard)	2

=== Year-end charts ===
2021 year-end chart performance for Mercury – Act 1
Chart (2021)	Position
Belgian Albums (Ultratop Wallonia)	88
French Albums (SNEP)	76
Spanish Albums (PROMUSICAE)	100
Swiss Albums (Schweizer Hitparade)	29
US Top Rock Albums (Billboard)	61

2022 year-end chart performance for Mercury – Act 1
Chart (2022)	Position
Canadian Albums (Billboard)	35
French Albums (SNEP)	14
Italian Albums (FIMI)	42
Spanish Albums (PROMUSICAE)	45
Swiss Albums (Schweizer Hitparade)	57
US Billboard 200	98
US Top Rock Albums (Billboard)	12

2023 year-end chart performance for Mercury – Act 1
Chart (2023)	Position
French Albums (SNEP)	17
Spanish Albums (PROMUSICAE)	87
US Billboard 200	168
US Top Rock Albums (Billboard)	26

2024 year-end chart performance for Mercury – Act 1
Chart (2024)	Position
French Albums (SNEP)	86

== Certifications ==
Certifications for Mercury – Act 1
Region	Certification	Certified units/sales
Canada (Music Canada)	Platinum	80,000^{‡}
Italy (FIMI)	2× Platinum	100,000^{‡}
Poland (ZPAV)	Gold	10,000^{‡}
Spain (Promusicae)	Gold	20,000^{‡}
United Kingdom (BPI)	Gold	100,000^{‡}
^{‡} Sales+streaming figures based on certification alone.

== Release history ==
Release dates and formats for Mercury – Act 1
Region	Date	Format	Version	Label	Ref.
Various	September 3, 2021	Box set; cassette; CD; digital download; streaming; vinyl	Standard	Kidinakorner; Interscope	
Japan	September 3, 2021	CD	Japan bonus	Universal Music Japan	
Brazil	October 15, 2021	CD	Standard	Universal Music Brasil	
