= Cory Henry =

American jazz and gospel musician (born 1987)

- Born: Cory Alexander Henry; February 27, 1987 (age 39); Brooklyn, New York, U.S.
- Genres: Jazz; gospel; R&B; soul; jazz-funk
- Occupations: Musician; singer; record producer; songwriter
- Instruments: Piano; organ; keyboards; drums; vocals
- Years active: 2006–present
- Labels: Wild Willis Jones; GroundUp; Culture Collective; Henry House
- Formerly of: Snarky Puppy
- Website: coryhenry.com

Cory Alexander Henry (born February 27, 1987) is an American jazz organist, pianist, gospel musician, and producer. A former member of Snarky Puppy, Henry launched his solo artist career in 2018 with Art of Love, his first independent release. In 2020, he released his sophomore full-length project, called Something to Say, which included the Marc E. Bassy-written track "No Guns". That same year he released Art of Love Live and Christmas with You, both under Culture Collective management and records.

Henry was selected by Quincy Jones to headline his curated Soundtrack of America series opening of The Shed in NYC. On August 5, 2021, Beats Electronics premiered a commercial featuring athlete Sha'Carri Richardson featuring the track "Run to Glory", which was co-produced and written by Henry, Kanye West and Dr. Dre. Henry was later credited as a producer and composer for the song "24" from West's tenth studio album, Donda.

== Early life ==
Henry was born in Brooklyn, New York, where he was playing both the piano and B3 organ at two years old. He played a show at the Apollo Theater when he was six.

== Career ==
His musical touring began in 2006, and he has since toured with many mainstream artists, including Bruce Springsteen, Michael McDonald, P. Diddy, Boyz II Men, Kenny Garrett, and The Roots, and gospel artists, among them Israel Houghton, Donnie McClurkin, Kirk Franklin, and Yolanda Adams.

He released his album First Steps on July 21, 2014, with Wild Willis Jones Records. The album charted on the Billboard charts and placed on the Top Jazz Albums and Top Heatseekers Albums, peaking at numbers five and 30, respectively. His second album, a live recording, The Revival, was released on March 18, 2016, by GroundUp Music. The album charted on the Top Gospel Albums and Top Jazz Albums, where it peaked at number five and number two respectively.

In 2018, Henry left Snarky Puppy to launch his solo career. On April 13, 2018, Henry released his debut single, "Trade It All", with his band The Funk Apostles. Three months later, on July 13, 2018, Henry released Art of Love, his first album with The Funk Apostles. Henry has frequently collaborated with Vulfpeck. On October 31, 2020, Henry released his sophomore full-length record, called Something to Say. In October 2019, Henry taught a songwriting workshop at the Brown Arts Institute at Brown University.

Throughout 2020 and 2021, Henry released three personal projects and was featured as a writer and performer on multiple other releases, including Imagine Dragons' "Cutthroat" and "Follow You", Jazmine Sullivan's "First Noel", and Marc E. Bassy's "Free Like Me". He appeared on Kanye West's album Donda, playing organ on "24" (a.k.a. "Run to Glory"). On September 10, 2021, Henry performed the national anthem with Michelle Williams at the National Football League's season opener in Tampa Bay, Florida.

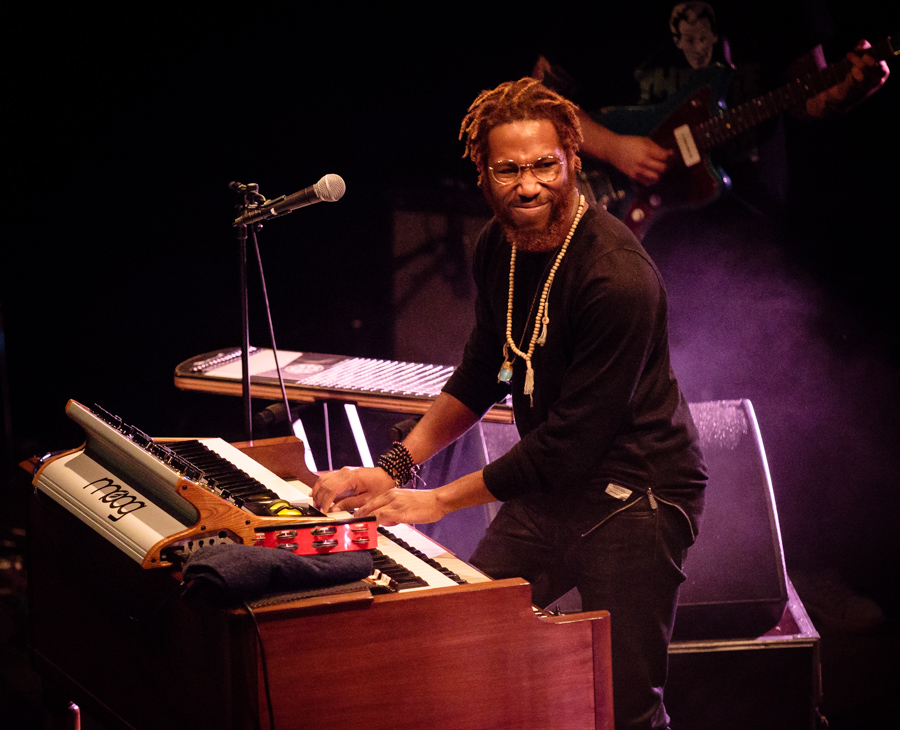
Henry performing in 2017

On September 17, 2021, Henry released his third solo album, Best of Me, featuring Henry performing on vocals, Hammond B3 organ, Moog synthesizer, and Harpejji. According to Henry, the album is "a collection of songs written and inspired by [his] musical heroes," with influences including Stevie Wonder, Marvin Gaye, Donny Hathaway, P-Funk, and James Brown.

On December 25, 2021, Henry was featured on Frank Ocean's 9-minute untitled song release on his Beats 1 radio show Blonded Radio. He is also featured as a credited writer and performer on the song "G3 N15" from Spanish singer Rosalía's 2022 album Motomami.

On July 2, 2022, Henry was featured again with Imagine Dragons in "Continual".

In 2022, Henry released a studio album, Operation Funk, which he followed up with a live version of the album later in the year.

On September 6, 2022, Henry announced on Twitter that he would be retiring from the music business in the near future so he can concentrate on playing music for his own enjoyment rather than financial reasons.

On October 31, 2025, Henry performed as a guest with Billy Strings and his band at the CFG Bank Arena in Baltimore, Maryland, in the band's annual Halloween-themed concert, alongside various other musical guests.

== Discography ==
List of selected albums, with selected chart positions
Title	Album details	Peak chart positions		
Title	Album details	US Gos	US Jazz	US Heat
First Steps	Released: July 21, 2014; Label: Wild Willis Jones; CD, digital download	—	5	30
The Revival	Released: March 18, 2016; Label: GroundUp; CD, digital download	5	2	—
Art of Love	Released: July 13, 2018; Label: Henry House Entertainment; digital download, vinyl disc	—	—	—
Art of Love (Live in LA)	Released: July 13, 2018; Label: Culture Collective; digital download			
Something to Say	Released: October 30, 2020; Label: Culture Collective; digital download, vinyl disc	—	—	—
Christmas With You	Released: December 11, 2020; Label: Culture Collective; digital download	—	—	—
Best of Me	Released: September 17, 2021; Label: Culture Collective; digital download	—	—	—
Operation Funk	Released: July 15, 2022; Label: Culture Collective; digital download	—	—	—
Church	Released: February 25, 2024; Label: Culture Collective; digital download	—	—	—

Grammy Awards

Year	Nominee / work	Award	Result
2022	Something to Say	Best Progressive R&B Album	Nominated
2022	New Light	Best Progressive R&B Album	Nominated
2022	Donda	Album of The Year	Nominated
2022	Donda	Best Rap Album	Nominated
2023	Operation Funk	Best Progressive R&B Album	Nominated
2024	Live at the Piano	Best Alternative Jazz Album	Nominated
2025	Church	Best Roots Gospel Album	Won
