= Sharks (Imagine Dragons song) =

Single by Imagine Dragons

from the album Mercury – Acts 1 & 2
- Released: June 24, 2022
- Length: 3:11
- Label: Interscope; Kidinakorner
- Songwriters: Dan Reynolds; Wayne Sermon; Ben McKee; Daniel Platzman; Robin Fredriksson; Mattias Larsson
- Producer: Mattman & Robin

Imagine Dragons singles chronology
"Bones" (2022)	"Sharks" (2022)	"I Don't Like Myself" (2022)

Music video
- "Sharks" on YouTube

"Sharks" is a song by American pop rock band Imagine Dragons, released as the second single from the band's fifth studio album, Mercury – Acts 1 & 2 on June 24, 2022. The song was released through Interscope and Kidinakorner. It was written by Dan Reynolds, Wayne Sermon, Ben McKee, Daniel Platzman, and its producers Mattman & Robin. The song charted internationally and was certified gold in multiple countries, including Canada and the United States.

== Music video ==
The band released the music video on June 24, 2022, directed by Drew Kirsch. The video, which pays homage to the 2001 film Ocean's Eleven, takes place in the band's home city of Las Vegas, where the band members pull off a heist in the Bellagio casino. After distracting guards, Dick Dark (Dan Reynolds) enters a restricted area, going through the backstage of O by Cirque du Soleil, a room of laser beams, and a shark aquarium. Eventually, he finds and pulls a lever saying "Do Not Pull", after which the sharks are released into the lake and fountains of the casino where Reynolds is seen surfing.

== Charts ==
Chart performance for "Sharks"
Chart (2022)	Peak position
Belgium (Ultratop 50 Wallonia)	33
Canada Hot 100 (Billboard)	92
Czech Republic Airplay (ČNS IFPI)	4
Czech Republic Singles Digital (ČNS IFPI)	18
France (SNEP)	33
Global 200 (Billboard)	124
Italy (FIMI)	86
Netherlands (Dutch Top 40)	22
Netherlands (Single Top 100)	59
New Zealand Hot Singles (RMNZ)	20
Poland Airplay (ZPAV)	4
Portugal (AFP)	188
San Marino (SMRRTV Top 50)	10
Switzerland (Schweizer Hitparade)	44
US Bubbling Under Hot 100 (Billboard)	24
US Hot Rock & Alternative Songs (Billboard)	12

== Certifications ==
Certifications for "Sharks"
Region	Certification	Certified units/sales
Brazil (Pro-Música Brasil)	Platinum	40,000^{‡}
Canada (Music Canada)	Gold	40,000^{‡}
France (SNEP)	Diamond	333,333^{‡}
Italy (FIMI)	Platinum	100,000^{‡}
New Zealand (RMNZ)	Gold	15,000^{‡}
Poland (ZPAV)	Platinum	50,000^{‡}
Spain (Promusicae)	Gold	30,000^{‡}
United Kingdom (BPI)	Silver	200,000^{‡}
United States (RIAA)	Gold	500,000^{‡}
^{‡} Sales+streaming figures based on certification alone.
