= Kings Elliot =

- "Born Blue" album cover---Release date: September 26, 2025

Background information
- Born: Anja Gmür; 5 September 1994 (age 32); Altendorf, Switzerland
- Genre: Indie pop
- Instrument: Vocals
- Labels: Decca Records; Vertigo Records; Verve Records / Verve Forecast Records
- Website: www.kingselliot.com

Anja Gmür (born 5 September 1994), known professionally as Kings Elliot, is a Swiss-English singer-songwriter based in London. She signed a record deal with Universal Music Group in 2021 and released three EPs. She won Best Breaking Act at the 2025 Swiss Music Awards. Her debut album Born Blue is set to be released in September 2025.

== Early life and education ==
Born to an English mother and a Swiss father, Elliot grew up in Wilen bei Wollerau (Freienbach) and Altendorf, Schwyz in Switzerland. She also had a stint living in Pfäffikon. After saving up money, Elliot moved to London in 2015 and took classes on pop songwriting at a music school.

== Career ==
Elliot auditioned for the 2008 season of MusicStar, but was rejected for being too young. Later in 2013, she made the first round of The Voice of Switzerland in its first season. Upon moving to London, Elliot started playing in pubs while working day jobs, many of which had to do with music (ticket collector at venues, night receptionist at a music studio, etc.). Her debut single "Colour" was released in 2019 under the moniker Kings (stylised as KINGS). She supported Lewis Capaldi on tour.

During the COVID-19 lockdown, during which she began uploading songs to social media, rebranded to Kings Elliot and released the single "I'm Getting Tired of Me". She now prefers to go by Kings Elliot, as she kept her name to herself for a period of time to give her the courage to express herself through her music.

In 2021, Elliot signed a record deal with Universal Music Group (Decca, Vertigo and Verve/Verve Forecast), through which she released her debut 5-track EP Chaos in My Court that December. Radio SRF 3 named Kings Elliot Best New Talent. Her song "Dancing Alone" gained prominence when it was shared by actress Reese Witherspoon. Elliot was nominated for Best Talent at the 2022 Swiss Music Awards and performed at the event alongside George Ezra.

Elliot had gigs at the 2022 Montreux Jazz Festival and Gurtenfestival and on the programme Inas Nacht. After opening their Bern concert, Imagine Dragons invited Elliot to support the North America part of their Mercury World Tour with Macklemore starting late summer. Elliot's second 5-track EP Bored of the Circus was released in September 2022. She also contributed to the soundtrack of the video game The Callisto Protocol with the song "Lost Again".

The following year, in 2023, Elliot supported Stephen Sanchez on his North America tour and Lana Del Rey at BST Hyde Park. Elliot released her third 6-track EP I'm Not Always Sad, Sometimes I'm Angry in 2024. Elliot returned to the 2025 Swiss Music Awards, winning Best Breaking Act.

Announced in March 2025, Elliot's debut album titled Born Blue is set to be released in September 2025, followed by headline UK and Europe tour dates. The album was preceded by the singles "Starcrossed", "Love and Landslides", and "The Promise". Opening acts for the tour included Jamila, Erica Manzoli and Vanès.

== Artistry ==
Elliot grew up listening to her mother's records, particularly Queen, as well as mid-century Disney animated film soundtracks, finding herself drawn to the "eerie melancholia" of "When You Wish Upon a Star", for example. She also recalls Emilia leaving an impression on her. Lyrically, Elliot makes mental health a central theme in her songwriting and aims to destigmatise the topic, having struggled with her mental health in the past.

== Personal life ==
Elliot has openly talked and sang about her struggles with Borderline Personality Disorder (BPD), anxiety, and depression. She is a member of the LGBT+ community. She owns four bunnies that she deems as her emotional support, and as can be seen on many of the covers of her singles, the bunnies are largely present. Her fans are largely referred to as "sick puppies", an affectionate name that Kings Elliot has given to herself, and in turn had inspired others to break the stigma of mental health and do the same.

== Discography ==
=== Albums ===
- Born Blue (2025)

=== EPs ===
- Chaos in my Court (2021)
- Bored of the Circus (2022)
- I'm Not Always Sad, Sometimes I'm Angry (2024)

=== Singles ===
- "Colour" (2019) (as KINGS)
- "I'm Getting Tired of Me" (2020)
- "Dancing Alone" (2021)
- "Bitter Tonic" (2021)
- "Call Me a Dreamer" (2021)
- "Lost Again" (2023)
- "It's My Birthday" (2023)
- "Never Be Mine" (2023)
- "Like I Was Never Here" (2024)
- "Enough" (2024)
- "I Hate the Sun" (2024)
- "Starcrossed" (2025)
- "Love and Landslides" (2025)
- "The Promise" (2025)
- “What if this world” (2025)
- ”BORN BLUE (THE SONG)” (2026)

=== Other ===
- "Lost Again" (2022) for The Callisto Protocol
