= Mercury World Tour =

2022–23 concert tour by Imagine Dragons

- World tour by Imagine Dragons
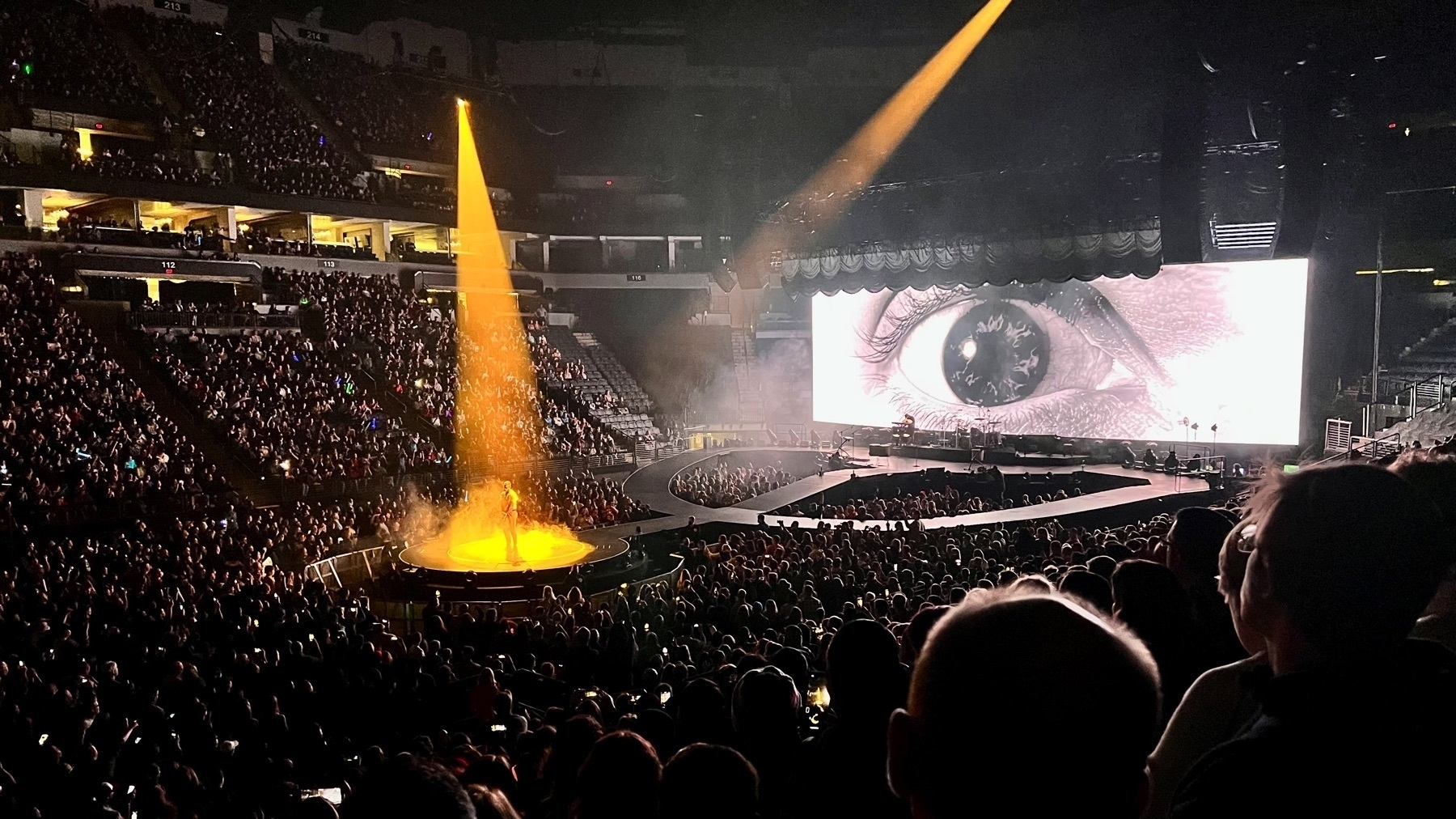
- Location: Africa; Asia; Europe; North America; South America
- Associated albums: Mercury – Acts 1 & 2
- Start date: February 6, 2022
- End date: September 10, 2023
- Legs: 8
- No. of shows: 108
- Supporting acts: Grandson; MØ; AVIV; Mother Mother; Karin Ann; Kings Elliot; KennyHoopla; Rkomi; Alexa Feser; Tuys; Lola Young; Emma Steinbakken; Dani; Macklemore; Jesse Clegg; OutroEu; MKRNI; Bambi; Lika Nova; TALK; Benson Boone; Oliver Tree; Chelsea Cutler; Em Beihold; AJR; Killages; The Amazons
- Website: www.imaginedragonsmusic.com/tour

Imagine Dragons concert chronology
- Evolve World Tour (2017–19); Mercury World Tour (2022–23); Loom World Tour (2024–26)

The Mercury World Tour was the fourth concert tour by American pop rock band Imagine Dragons in support of their full fifth studio album consisting of Mercury – Acts 1 (2021) and 2 (2022). The tour began on February 6, 2022, at the FTX Arena in Miami, and concluded on September 10, 2023, at Lollapalooza Berlin. It was the band's last tour to feature longtime drummer Daniel Platzman, as he went on a hiatus from the band in March 2023, and announced his permanent departure in August 2024.

== Background ==
Four days after the release of Mercury – Act 1, the band announced that they would embark on a 17-date North American tour, beginning in early February and stretching to March. Pre-sale access was given to American Express Card members on September 7 through September 9. Tickets went on-sale to the general public on September 10, 2021.

On November 1, 2021, European dates were announced. The European leg spanned 2 months and visited festivals and stadiums. Tickets for the European leg went on-sale on November 5, 2021. American pop group LANY were initially announced as the opening act for the North American leg of the tour but were dropped shortly after, most likely due to allegations of predatory behavior resurfacing. On December 10, Imagine Dragons announced that Canadian-American singer Grandson and Danish singer MØ would serve as LANY's replacements.

On December 14, 2021, the band announced twelve Canadian tour dates with AVIV serving as the opening act.

On February 25, 2022, the band announced the cancellation of tour dates in Ukraine and Russia, due to the ongoing Russian invasion of Ukraine.

On March 25, 2022, the band announced a second North American leg of the tour, with Macklemore and Kings Elliot serving as opening acts. On April 6, the band announced that Mother Mother would serve as opening act for the European leg of the tour.

On August 4, 2022, the band announced the shows of South American leg of the tour. However, on October 17, 2022, just one day before they were set to begin, the shows were postponed due to health issues with lead singer Dan Reynolds. The new dates, scheduled to take place in March 2023, were announced in November.

On November 25, 2022, Live Nation Entertainment announced an additional number of performances in Europe, extending the tour up to September 10, 2023.

On March 24, 2023, the band announced AJR and Mother Mother as opening acts for their final leg of the tour which took place in Europe in the summer of 2023.

== Tour dates ==
List of 2022 concerts, showing date, city, country, or district, venue, opening act, tickets sold, number of available tickets and amount of gross revenue
Date	City	Country	Venue	Opening act(s)	Attendance	Revenue
February 6, 2022	Miami	United States	FTX Arena	Grandson	11,532 / 11,532	$1,420,534
February 8, 2022	Jacksonville	United States	VyStar Veterans Memorial Arena	Grandson	10,690 / 10,690	$1,088,641
February 10, 2022	Raleigh	United States	PNC Arena	Grandson	12,079 / 12,079	$1,253,788
February 12, 2022	Columbia	United States	Colonial Life Arena	Grandson	11,295 / 11,295	$1,206,075
February 14, 2022	Elmont	United States	UBS Arena	Grandson	11,773 / 13,082	$1,499,600
February 16, 2022	Allentown	United States	PPL Center	Grandson	6,375 / 7,746	$439,343
February 19, 2022	Pittsburgh	United States	PPG Paints Arena	Grandson	12,635 / 13,380	$1,380,102
February 21, 2022	Indianapolis	United States	Gainbridge Fieldhouse	Grandson	11,731 / 12,420	$1,075,414
February 23, 2022	St. Louis	United States	Enterprise Center	Grandson	11,108 / 12,735	$1,050,238
February 25, 2022	Milwaukee	United States	Fiserv Forum	MØ	11,468 / 11,967	$1,200,193
February 27, 2022	Minneapolis	United States	Target Center	MØ	12,951 / 14,366	$1,361,309
March 2, 2022	Boise	United States	ExtraMile Arena	MØ	8,629 / 8,938	$988,839
March 5, 2022	Seattle	United States	Climate Pledge Arena	MØ	24,310 / 25,826	$2,353,924
March 7, 2022	Seattle	United States	Climate Pledge Arena	MØ	24,310 / 25,826	$2,353,924
March 9, 2022	Portland	United States	Moda Center	MØ	12,908 / 13,294	$1,212,046
March 12, 2022	Los Angeles	United States	Crypto.com Arena	MØ	13,790 / 13,790	$2,066,947
March 14, 2022	Phoenix	United States	Footprint Center	MØ	12,156 / 12,802	$1,611,140
April 10, 2022	Victoria	Canada	Save-On-Foods Memorial Centre	AVIV	5,251 / 5,765	$501,595
April 13, 2022	Edmonton	Canada	Rogers Place	AVIV	8,738 / 14,162	$621,428
April 15, 2022	Calgary	Canada	Scotiabank Saddledome	AVIV	11,595 / 12,042	$902,488
April 17, 2022	Saskatoon	Canada	SaskTel Centre	AVIV	7,734 / 11,518	$551,841
April 19, 2022	Winnipeg	Canada	Canada Life Centre	AVIV	6,951 / 8,509	$489,930
April 22, 2022	Ottawa	Canada	Canadian Tire Centre	AVIV	10,428 / 12,117	$734,657
April 24, 2022	London	Canada	Budweiser Gardens	AVIV	7,645 / 7,934	$655,811
April 26, 2022	Quebec City	Canada	Videotron Centre	AVIV	25,214 / 35,406 (Note: The score data is combined from the shows held in Quebec City in April 26 & May 1, 2022)	$2,048,140 (Note: Sales are combined from the shows held in Quebec City in April 26 and May 1, 2022)
April 28, 2022	Moncton	Canada	Avenir Centre	AVIV	6,682 / 7,167	$559,847
May 1, 2022	Quebec City	Canada	Videotron Centre	AVIV		
May 3, 2022	Montreal	Canada	Bell Centre	AVIV	26,056 / 30,814	$2,479,256
May 4, 2022	Montreal	Canada	Bell Centre	AVIV	26,056 / 30,814	$2,479,256
June 1, 2022	Riga	Latvia	Mežaparks	Mother Mother; Karin Ann	18,981 / 20,000	$1,018,520
June 5, 2022	Prague	Czech Republic	Letňany	Mother Mother; Karin Ann	115,018 / 115,018	$9,330,557
June 6, 2022	Prague	Czech Republic	Letňany	Mother Mother; Karin Ann	115,018 / 115,018	$9,330,557
June 9, 2022	Bern	Switzerland	Stadion Wankdorf	Mother Mother; Kings Elliot	38,080 / 41,163	$5,063,265
June 11, 2022 (Note: The June 11, 2022, concert in Milan was part of Independent Days Festival.)	Milan	Italy	Ippodromo Snai La Maura	Mother Mother; KennyHoopla; Rkomi	—N/a	—N/a
June 14, 2022	Hanover	Germany	Messegelände Hannover	Mother Mother; Alexa Feser	20,611 / 24,645	$642,915
June 16, 2022 (Note: The June 16, 2022 concert in Esch-sur-Alzette was part of Open Air Belval.)	Esch-sur-Alzette	Luxembourg	Rockhal	Mother Mother; Tuys	—N/a	—N/a
June 18, 2022	Milton Keynes	England	Stadium MK	Mother Mother; Lola Young	27,100 / 35,000	$1,974,327
June 19, 2022 (Note: The June 19, 2022, concert in Landgraaf was part of Pinkpop Festival.)	Landgraaf	Netherlands	Megaland	—N/a	—N/a	—N/a
June 23, 2022	Vienna	Austria	Ernst-Happel Stadion	Mother Mother; Kings Elliot	35,608 / 40,816	$2,457,983
June 25, 2022 (Note: The June 25, 2022 concert in Odense was part of Tinderbox.)	Odense	Denmark	Tusindårsskoven	—N/a	—N/a	—N/a
June 27, 2022	Bergen	Norway	Koengen	Mother Mother; Emma Steinbakken	22,000 / 22,000	$1,520,985
June 29, 2022 (Note: The June 29, 2022, concert in Gdynia was part of Open'er Festival.)	Gdynia	Poland	Lotnisko Gdynia-Kosakowo	—N/a	—N/a	—N/a
July 1, 2022 (Note: The July 1, 2022, concert in Stockholm was part of Lollapalooza Stockholm.)	Stockholm	Sweden	Gärdet	—N/a	—N/a	—N/a
July 2, 2022 (Note: The July 2, 2022, concert in Werchter was part of Rock Werchter.)	Werchter	Belgium	Festivalpark Werchter	—N/a	—N/a	—N/a
July 5, 2022	Berlin	Germany	Waldbühne	Mother Mother; Alexa Feser	21,456 / 21,456	$516,389
July 7, 2022 (Note: The July 7, 2022, concert in Madrid was part of Mad Cool.)	Madrid	Spain	IFEMA	—N/a	—N/a	—N/a
July 9, 2022 (Note: The July 9, 2022, concert in Lisbon was part of NOS Alive.)	Lisbon	Portugal	Passeio Marítimo de Algés	—N/a	—N/a	—N/a
July 11, 2022	Santiago de Compostela	Spain	Monte do Gozo	Mother Mother; Dani	31,097 / 35,000	$1,583,242
July 14, 2022	Mönchengladbach	Germany	Warsteiner HockeyPark	Mother Mother; Alexa Feser	19,996 / 21,296	$497,371
July 16, 2022 (Note: The July 16, 2022, concert in Paris was part of Lollapalooza Paris.)	Paris	France	Hippodrome de Longchamp	—N/a	—N/a	—N/a
August 5, 2022	Salt Lake City	United States	Rice-Eccles Stadium	Macklemore; Kings Elliot	36,071 / 36,071	$2,893,663
August 7, 2022	Albuquerque	United States	Isleta Amphitheater	Macklemore; Kings Elliot	15,192 / 15,192	$1,002,151
August 9, 2022	Kansas City	United States	T-Mobile Center	Macklemore; Kings Elliot	13,012 / 13,012	$1,301,347
August 12, 2022	Hershey	United States	Hersheypark Stadium	Macklemore; Kings Elliot	27,916 / 27,916	$2,450,933
August 14, 2022	Bristow	United States	Jiffy Lube Live	Macklemore; Kings Elliot	22,795 / 22,795	$1,651,061
August 16, 2022	Camden	United States	Freedom Mortgage Pavilion	Macklemore; Kings Elliot	17,928 / 24,716	$1,138,244
August 18, 2022	Holmdel	United States	PNC Bank Arts Center	Macklemore; Kings Elliot	17,072 / 17,267	$1,210,041
August 20, 2022	Boston	United States	Fenway Park	Macklemore; Kings Elliot	33,190 / 33,190	$3,413,034
August 22, 2022	Toronto	Canada	Rogers Centre	Macklemore; Kings Elliot	27,421 / 31,208	$1,956,495
August 24, 2022	Clarkston	United States	Pine Knob Music Theatre	Macklemore; Kings Elliot	14,878 / 14,878	$1,102,146
August 26, 2022	Tinley Park	United States	Hollywood Casino Amphitheatre	Macklemore; Kings Elliot	25,576 / 25,576	$1,446,131
August 28, 2022	Cincinnati	United States	Riverbend Music Center	Macklemore; Kings Elliot	20,327 / 20,327	$1,156,695
August 30, 2022	Atlanta	United States	Cellairis Amphitheatre	Macklemore; Kings Elliot	15,274 / 18,800	$1,106,483
September 1, 2022	The Woodlands	United States	Cynthia Woods Mitchell Pavilion	Macklemore; Kings Elliot	15,919 / 15,919	$1,203,967
September 3, 2022	Dallas	United States	Dos Equis Pavilion	Kings Elliot	20,331 / 20,331	$1,398,465
September 5, 2022	Commerce City	United States	Dick's Sporting Goods Park	Macklemore; Kings Elliot	22,258 / 22,258	$2,414,319
September 8, 2022	Mountain View	United States	Shoreline Amphitheatre	Macklemore; Kings Elliot	21,935 / 21,935	$1,408,951
September 10, 2022	Las Vegas	United States	Allegiant Stadium	Macklemore; Kings Elliot	40,262 / 40,262	$3,789,234
September 13, 2022	Chula Vista (Note: Promoted as San Diego)	United States	North Island Credit Union Amphitheatre	Macklemore; Kings Elliot	19,572 / 19,572	$1,265,719
September 15, 2022	Los Angeles	United States	Banc of California Stadium	Macklemore; Kings Elliot	22,009 / 22,009	$2,267,258
December 2, 2022	Washington, D.C.	United States	Capital One Arena	—	10,609 / 14,470	$1,153,829

List of 2023 concerts, showing date, city, country, or district, venue, opening act, tickets sold, number of available tickets and amount of gross revenue
Date	City	Country	Venue	Opening act(s)	Attendance	Revenue
January 22, 2023	Riyadh	Saudi Arabia	BLVD International Festival Site	—N/a	13,073 / 20,000	$1,751,211
January 24, 2023	Zallaq	Bahrain	Al Dana Amphitheater	—N/a	9,476 / 10,000	$1,023,335
January 26, 2023	Abu Dhabi	United Arab Emirates	Etihad Arena	—N/a	13,693 / 14,000	$1,750,237
January 28, 2023	Mumbai	India	Mahalaxmi Racecourse	—N/a	—N/a	—N/a
February 1, 2023	Cape Town	South Africa	DHL Stadium	Jesse Clegg	34,461 / 40,000	$1,866,363
February 4, 2023	Johannesburg	South Africa	FNB Stadium	Jesse Clegg	43,324 / 55,000	$2,244,775
February 28, 2023 (Note: The concert in São Paulo on February 28, 2023, was originally scheduled to take place on October 27, 2022, but it was postponed due to health issues with Dan Reynolds.)	São Paulo	Brazil	Allianz Parque	OutroEu	49,085 / 49,085	$3,788,051
March 2, 2023 (Note: The concert in Curitiba on March 2, 2023, was originally scheduled to take place on October 25, 2022, but it was postponed due to health issues with Dan Reynolds.)	Curitiba	Brazil	Pedreira Paulo Leminski	OutroEu	22,065 / 25,000	$1,798,945
March 4, 2023 (Note: The concert in Rio de Janeiro on March 4, 2023, was originally scheduled to take place on October 29, 2022, but it was postponed due to health issues with Dan Reynolds.)	Rio de Janeiro	Brazil	Jeunesse Arena	OutroEu	24,545 / 34,500	$1,697,986
March 7, 2023 (Note: The concert in Santiago on March 7, 2023, was originally scheduled to take place on October 21, 2022, but it was postponed due to health issues with Dan Reynolds.)	Santiago	Chile	Estadio Bicentenario de La Florida	MKRNI	22,654 / 25,308	$1,958,784
March 9, 2023 (Note: The concert in Buenos Aires on March 9, 2023, was originally scheduled to take place on October 23, 2022, at the Hipódromo Argentino de Palermo, but it was postponed due to health issues with Dan Reynolds. Before the postmonement, the concert had moved venue to Costanera Sur.)	Buenos Aires	Argentina	Campo Argentino de Polo	Bambi	48,266 / 55,995	$3,365,155
March 12, 2023 (Note: The concert in Bogotá on March 12, 2023, was originally scheduled to take place on October 18, 2022, but it was postponed due to health issues with Dan Reynolds.)	Bogotá	Colombia	Coliseo Live	Lika Nova	16,054 / 18,082	$1,136,531
March 18, 2023	Tampa	United States	Raymond James Stadium Grounds	—N/a	—	—
May 17, 2023 (Note: When the leg was initially postponed, the original shows at the Palacio de los Deportes were formally cancelled, with tickets being completely refunded. For this new show in the city, attendees needed to buy new tickets.)	Mexico City	Mexico	Foro Sol	—N/a	60,604 / 61,174	$5,149,115
May 19, 2023	Monterrey	Mexico	Estadio Borregos	Mother Mother	18,691 / 19,990	$1,585,363
May 20, 2023 (Note: The concert in Guadalajara on May 20, 2023, is part of the Corona Capital Guadalajara music festival.)	Guadalajara	Mexico	Valle VFG	—N/a	—	—
July 7, 2023 (Note: The concert in Quebec City on July 7, 2023, is part of Festival d'été de Québec.)	Quebec City	Canada	Plaines d’Abraham	Grandson TALK	—	—
July 8, 2023 (Note: The concert in Milwaukee on July 8, 2023, is part of Summerfest.)	Milwaukee	United States	American Family Insurance Amphitheater	Benson Boone	23,037 / 23,037	$1,921,496
July 15, 2023 (Note: The concert in Minneapolis on July 15, 2023, is part of TC Summer Fest.)	Minneapolis	United States	Target Field	Oliver Tree; Chelsea Cutler; Em Beihold; TALK	—N/a	—N/a
July 28, 2023	Riyadh	Saudi Arabia	Mohammed Abdu Arena	—N/a	—N/a	—N/a
July 30, 2023	Sofia	Bulgaria	Vasil Levski National Stadium	—N/a	47,378 / 47,378	$3,589,421
August 2, 2023 (Note: The concert in Skanderborg on August 2, 2023, is part of Smukfest.)	Skanderborg	Denmark	Bøgeskoven	—N/a	—	—
August 4, 2023	Cluj-Napoca	Romania	Cluj Arena	—N/a	—	—
August 5, 2023	Rome	Italy	Circus Maximus	AJR	—	—
August 8, 2023	Pula	Croatia	Pula Arena	AJR	16,324 / 16,356	$1,479,280
August 9, 2023	Pula	Croatia	Pula Arena	AJR	16,324 / 16,356	$1,479,280
August 11, 2023	Budapest	Hungary	Sziget Festival	—N/a	—	—
August 14, 2023	Warsaw	Poland	PGE Narodowy	AJR	54,403 / 54,543	$4,490,619
August 16, 2023	Vilnius	Lithuania	Vingis Park	AJR	42,013 / 42,185	$3,513,799
August 18, 2023	St Polten	Austria	FM4 Frequency Festival	—N/a	—	—
August 20, 2023	Bratislava	Slovakia	Vajnory Airport	—N/a	—	—
August 22, 2023	Nanterre	France	Paris La Défense Arena	AJR	80,628 / 80,711	$7,664,786
August 23, 2023	Nanterre	France	Paris La Défense Arena	Mother Mother	80,628 / 80,711	$7,664,786
August 25, 2023	Leeds	England	Bramham Park	—N/a	—	—
August 27, 2023	Reading	England	Reading Festival	—N/a	—	—
August 29, 2023	Tel Aviv	Israel	Yarkon Park	AJR	59,051 / 59,148	$6,593,729
August 31, 2023	Tbilisi	Georgia	Mikheil Meskhi Stadium	Killages	30,000 / 30,000	—
September 2, 2023	Baku	Azerbaijan	Baku Olympic Stadium	The Amazons	45,000 / 45,000	—
September 3, 2023	Munich	Germany	Olympiapark	—N/a	—	—
September 6, 2023	Athens	Greece	Athens Olympic Sports Complex	AJR	31,636 / 34,278	$2,147,927
September 8, 2023	Chambord	France	Château de Chambord	AJR	—	—
September 10, 2023 (Note: The concert in Berlin on September 10, 2023, is part of Lollapalooza Berlin.)	Berlin	Germany	Olympiastadion	—N/a	—	—

=== Cancelled dates ===
List of cancelled concerts, showing date, city, country, venue and reason for cancellation
Date	City	Country	Venue	Reason
March 4, 2022	Vancouver	Canada	Rogers Arena	—N/a
June 3, 2022	Kyiv	Ukraine	Olympic Stadium	Russian invasion of Ukraine
June 5, 2022	Moscow	Russia	Luzhniki Stadium	Russian invasion of Ukraine
June 7, 2022	St. Petersburg	Russia	Gazprom Arena	Russian invasion of Ukraine
November 1, 2022	Mexico City	Mexico	Palacio de los Deportes	Health issues with Dan Reynolds.
November 2, 2022	Mexico City	Mexico	Palacio de los Deportes	Health issues with Dan Reynolds.
November 4, 2022	Mexico City	Mexico	Palacio de los Deportes	Health issues with Dan Reynolds.
