= Wrecked (song) =

Single by Imagine Dragons

from the album Mercury – Act 1
- Released: July 2, 2021
- Recorded: 2020–2021
- Length: 4:04
- Label: Interscope; Kidinakorner
- Songwriters: Dan Reynolds; Wayne Sermon; Ben McKee; Daniel Platzman
- Producer: Imagine Dragons

Imagine Dragons singles chronology
"Follow You" and "Cutthroat" (2021)	"Wrecked" (2021)	"Monday" (2021)

Music video
- "Wrecked" on YouTube

"Wrecked" is a song by American band Imagine Dragons. It was released through Interscope and Kidinakorner on July 2, 2021, as the second single from their fifth studio album, Mercury – Act 1. It was written by band members Dan Reynolds, Wayne Sermon, Ben McKee, and Daniel Platzman, who also produced it.

== Background ==
The song was inspired by lead singer Dan Reynolds’ sister-in-law, Alisha Durtschi Reynolds, who died from cancer, Reynolds said in a press: "She was the brightest light. A beacon of joy and strength for everyone she met. Her sudden passing has shaken me in ways that I still am unable to express. I was with her and my brother when she passed, and it was the first time in my life that I had witnessed death in this way. It sealed into my mind the fragility of life and finality of this all. I’ve watched my brother face something that no one should have to. But I’ve also seen his faith bring him hope in a future with her. I can only hope for the same."

He described the song was his "way of dealing with it all, as music has always been my refuge. No longer being a man of fervent faith, I can only hope that she hears it somewhere in a place where she is healed and no longer in pain. This song is my wish for an eternity with those that I love."

== Credits and personnel ==
Credits adapted from AllMusic.

- Serban Ghenea – engineer, mixing
- John Hanes – mixing engineer
- Imagine Dragons – primary artist, producer, recording
- Jason Lader – engineer
- Ben McKee – bass, composer
- Randy Merrill – mastering engineer
- Matthew Sedivy – engineer
- Dylan Neustadter – engineer
- Jonathan Pfarr – engineer
- Daniel Platzman – composer, drums
- Dan Reynolds – composer, programming, vocals
- Wayne Sermon – composer, programming, guitar

== Charts ==
=== Weekly charts ===
Weekly chart performance for "Wrecked"
Chart (2021–2022)	Peak position
Austria (Ö3 Austria Top 40)	57
Belgium (Ultratop 50 Flanders)	21
Belgium (Ultratop 50 Wallonia)	21
Canada Hot 100 (Billboard)	91
Canada Rock (Billboard)	27
Czech Republic Airplay (ČNS IFPI)	2
Czech Republic Singles Digital (ČNS IFPI)	13
France (SNEP)	38
Germany (GfK)	75
Global 200 (Billboard)	90
Ireland (IRMA)	77
Italy (FIMI)	85
Netherlands (Dutch Top 40)	25
Netherlands (Single Top 100)	53
New Zealand Hot Singles (RMNZ)	6
Poland Airplay (ZPAV)	25
Portugal (AFP)	126
San Marino (SMRRTV Top 50)	40
Slovakia Airplay (ČNS IFPI)	2
Slovakia Singles Digital (ČNS IFPI)	47
Sweden (Sverigetopplistan)	64
Switzerland (Schweizer Hitparade)	10
US Bubbling Under Hot 100 (Billboard)	11
US Hot Rock & Alternative Songs (Billboard)	11
US Rock & Alternative Airplay (Billboard)	4

=== Year-end charts ===
2021 year-end chart performance for "Wrecked"
Chart (2021)	Position
Belgium (Ultratop Flanders)	78
Switzerland (Schweizer Hitparade)	41
US Hot Rock & Alternative Songs (Billboard)	33
US Rock Airplay (Billboard)	28

2022 year-end chart performance for "Wrecked"
Chart (2022)	Position
Belgium (Ultratop Flanders)	140
Belgium (Ultratop Wallonia)	134
France (SNEP)	130
Switzerland (Schweizer Hitparade)	58

== Certifications ==
Certifications for "Wrecked"
Region	Certification	Certified units/sales
Brazil (Pro-Música Brasil)	2× Platinum	80,000^{‡}
Canada (Music Canada)	Platinum	80,000^{‡}
France (SNEP)	Diamond	333,333^{‡}
Italy (FIMI)	Platinum	100,000^{‡}
New Zealand (RMNZ)	Gold	15,000^{‡}
Poland (ZPAV)	2× Platinum	100,000^{‡}
Spain (Promusicae)	Gold	30,000^{‡}
United Kingdom (BPI)	Silver	200,000^{‡}
United States (RIAA)	Gold	500,000^{‡}
^{‡} Sales+streaming figures based on certification alone.

== Release history ==
Release history for "Wrecked"
Region	Date	Format	Label	Ref.
Various	July 2, 2021	Digital download; streaming	Interscope; Kidinakorner	
United States	July 13, 2021	Alternative radio	Interscope; Kidinakorner	
Italy	July 16, 2021	Contemporary hit radio	Interscope; Kidinakorner	
