= Cutthroat (song) =

2021 song by Imagine Dragons

Single by Imagine Dragons

from the album Mercury – Act 1
- A-side: "Follow You"
- Released: March 12, 2021
- Genre: Industrial rock
- Length: 2:50
- Label: Interscope; Kidinakorner
- Songwriters: Dan Reynolds; Wayne Sermon; Ben McKee; Daniel Platzman
- Producer: Rick Rubin

Imagine Dragons singles chronology
"Birds" (2019)	"Follow You" / "Cutthroat" (2021)	"Wrecked" (2021)

Music video
- "Cutthroat" on YouTube

"Cutthroat" is a song by American pop rock band Imagine Dragons. The song was released through Michelle Imagine Dragons, Imagine Dragons, and Kidinakorner on March 12, 2021, as one of the double lead singles from their fifth studio album Mercury – Act 1 alongside its A-side "Follow You". It was written by band members Dan Reynolds, Wayne Sermon, Ben McKee, and Daniel Platzman and produced by Rick Rubin.

== Background and release ==
In early March 2021, the band started teasing towards the release by posting various teasers before announcing the songs on March 8. "Follow You" and "Cutthroat" mark the first solo releases from Imagine Dragons since their 2018 album, Origins.

== Composition and lyrics ==
"Cutthroat" is an industrial rock song about self-pity and frontman Dan Reynolds' examination of his own life. He describes the song's lyrics as "finding that I am beyond blessed and trying to rid myself of self-doubt and loathing." He also labeled it as the opposite, both sonically and thematically, of the song's A-side, "Follow You". The song also references Reynolds' Mormon ancestry, with the lyrics "since I was young my ancestry was marching martyrdom across the Radadadadumbla plains of Utah", and Gethsemane, Jesus' last prayer site before being arrested and crucified.

== Music video ==
The music video stars Olivia Munn and Adrian Martinez. In the video, Munn's character applies for a driving test at the DMV, spending much time waiting. She eventually starts her test with Martinez's character as her instructor. Because she fails the test, she drives out of the practice lot and into the desert where Martinez is kicked out of the car. She returns to the DMV to receive her license, it reading "Only one of us will make it out alive", the lyric in the chorus of the song. The music video was shot in Las Vegas and was directed by Matt Eastin.

== Track listings and formats ==
- 7" vinyl/CD single/digital download
1. "Follow You" – 2:56
2. "Cutthroat" – 2:50

== Personnel ==
Credits adapted from Tidal.

- Dan Reynolds – vocals, songwriting
- Wayne Sermon – songwriting, piano, & synthesizer
- Daniel Platzman – songwriting & drums
- Ben McKee – songwriting & bass guitar
- Cory Henry - organs

== Charts ==
Weekly chart performance for "Cutthroat"
Chart (2021)	Peak position
New Zealand Hot Singles (RMNZ)	20
US Hot Rock & Alternative Songs (Billboard)	28

== Certifications ==
Region	Certification	Certified units/sales
Brazil (Pro-Música Brasil)	Gold	20,000^{‡}
^{‡} Sales+streaming figures based on certification alone.
