= Karin Ann =

Slovak singer-songwriter (born 2002)

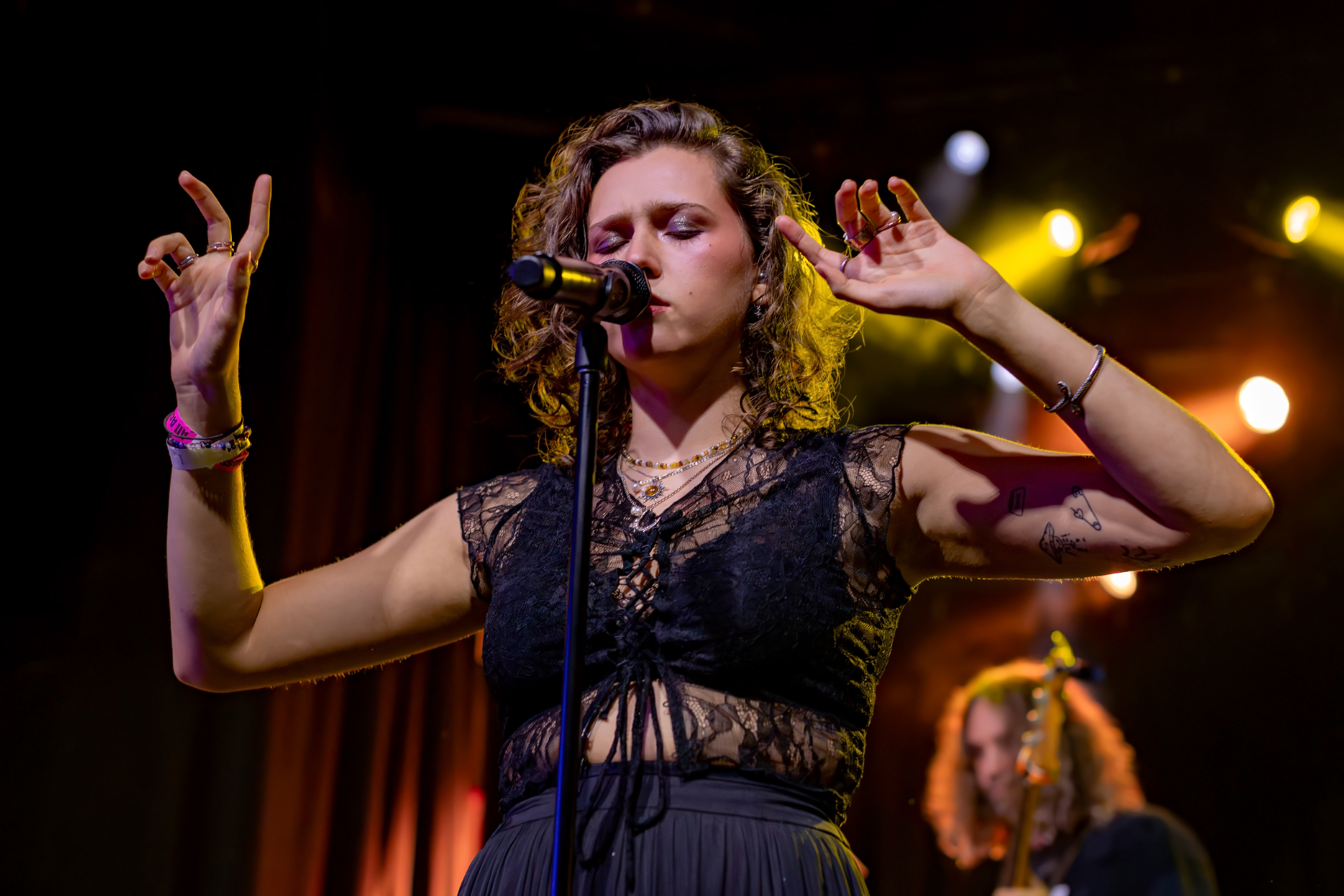
- Karin Ann performing in 2024

Background information
- Born: Karin Ann Trabelssie; 10 May 2002 (age 23); Čadca, Slovakia
- Genres: Indie pop
- Occupations: Singer; songwriter
- Years active: 2020–present
- Website: karin-ann.com

Karin Ann Trabelssie (born 10 May 2002), known professionally as Karin Ann, is a Slovak singer-songwriter. She is best known for indie pop music with a focus on mental health issues and LGBTQ activism.

== Early life and education ==
Karin Ann was born on 10 May 2002, in Čadca, near the borders with Czechia and Poland. She is of Czech and Syrian heritage.

Karin Ann has stated that her attention deficit hyperactivity disorder diagnosis drove her early interest in art. She began attending school for graphic design but turned to music after suffering a hand injury. She cites Grace Vanderwaal as an early musical influence who inspired her to begin playing the ukulele.

Karin Ann describes Slovakia as a conservative country where being queer is "not widely accepted". She has cited how hard it is to find people open about their sexuality and the lack of queer media in the country.

== Career ==
Ann published the single "3AM" in 2020, her first English language release. In 2021, she released the single "I'm a Loser", a song which focused on the impact the COVID-19 pandemic had on the mental health of her generation. In the same year, she grew in recognition throughout Europe by winning Discovery of the Year award at the Žebřík Music Awards and Best Music Video at the Munich Music Awards. She has opened for My Chemical Romance and Imagine Dragons. While performing live on public Polish Television, she wrapped herself in a rainbow flag and dedicated her performance to LGBTQ people. Her performance, in contrast to Poland's poor record on LGBTQ rights, made headlines, gaining her increased popularity. Her single "In Company" was included in Spotify's EQAL Global playlist and advertised on a billboard in Times Square.

In 2022, Ann released the EP Side Effects of Being Human, followed by her debut full-length album Through the Telescope in 2024. The album was produced by Benjamin Lazar Davis and Will Graefe and has been described as a mix of rock and folk music styles. In 2025 she teamed up with Mark Plati and other collaborators of David Bowie to record a rendition of Bowie's hit "'Heroes'".

Vanity Fair called Ann an "icon of the LGBTQ+ community" in Eastern Europe.

== Personal life ==
Until 2022, Karin Ann resided in the city of Žilina. In 2022 she relocated to London.

== Discography ==
=== Albums ===
- Through the Telescope (2024)
- Choking On My Words (2025)

=== EPs ===
- Side Effects of Being Human (2022)

=== Singles ===
- "3AM" (2020)
- "In Company" (2021)
- "I'm a Loser" (2021)
- "I Don't Believe in God" (2024)
- "I Was Never Yours" (2025)
- "Choking On My Words"

Notes

- "I Was Never Yours", "Through the Telescope", "Choking On My Words", and "Side Effects of Being Human" are stylized in lower case.

== See also ==
- LGBTQ rights in Slovakia
- COVID-19 pandemic in Slovakia
