= Monday (Imagine Dragons song) =

2021 song by Imagine Dragons

Single by Imagine Dragons

from the album Mercury – Act 1
- Released: September 24, 2021
- Length: 3:08
- Label: Kidinakorner; Interscope
- Songwriter(s): Dan Reynolds; Wayne Sermon; Ben McKee; Daniel Platzman; Andrew Tolman
- Producer(s): Imagine Dragons; Goldwiing

Imagine Dragons singles chronology
"Wrecked" (2021)	"Monday" (2021)	"Enemy" (2021)

Music video
- "Monday" on YouTube

"Monday" is a song by American pop rock band Imagine Dragons. The song was released through Kidinakorner and Interscope on September 24, 2021, as the third and final single from their fifth studio album, Mercury – Act 1. The song was first played live a week before the album's release at the Walmart Live Homecoming.

== Background and composition ==
"Monday" was written by band members Dan Reynolds, Wayne Sermon, Ben McKee, Daniel Platzman as well as former band member Andrew Tolman. It was produced by the band and Goldwiing. The song is upbeat and synth-pop with lyrics written for Reynolds' wife Aja Volkman designed to be tongue-in-cheek and danceable for them both. Reynolds uses the reverse metaphor of Monday, usually the worst day of the week, to highlight Reynolds' affection. He described the creation of the song in an interview with Clash:

This song began at [Sermon's] house and then really came to life at Rick Rubin’s studio Shangri-La. It had interesting elements in its demo state but Rick really pushed us to "go there". He is all about the groove feeling "right" and so we started by diving into the synth and drums to get it right and then built from there. It's a bit of a tongue and cheek song directed at my wife of 10 years. My love for her and all we have endured together.

— Dan Reynolds

== Music video ==
The music video for "Monday" premiered on September 24, 2021 and was directed by Matt Eastin. The video follows all four band members relaxing, performing, and hanging out in their summer paradise bunker. The video shows them playing on a putting green, in a swimming pool, and badminton. The video shows TV broadcasts of global catastrophe scenarios that doom and end the world like wars, meteors, UFO invasions, and earthquakes. A rumbling occurs at the end of the second verse, but they continue performing. At the end of the video, Dan Reynolds travels up an elevator and outside into the fallout with a gas mask to receive a newspaper of the world's end. He quickly reenters the bunker before a meteor strikes in front.

== Personnel ==
Musicians

- Dan Reynolds – lead vocals, programming
- Wayne Sermon – guitar, programming
- Ben McKee – bass guitar
- Daniel Platzman – drums

Production

- Rick Rubin – executive production
- Imagine Dragons – production, recording engineering
- Goldwiing – production
- Serban Ghenea – mixing, recording engineering
- John Hanes – mixing, recording engineering
- Randy Merrill – mastering

== Charts ==
Chart performance for "Monday"
Chart (2021)	Peak position
New Zealand Hot Singles (RMNZ)	17
US Hot Rock & Alternative Songs (Billboard)	28
