= Follow You (Imagine Dragons song) =

Single by Imagine Dragons

from the album Mercury – Act 1
- B-side: "Cutthroat"
- Released: March 12, 2021
- Length: 2:56
- Label: Interscope; Kidinakorner
- Songwriters: Dan Reynolds; Wayne Sermon; Ben McKee; Daniel Platzman; Joel Little; Fran Hall; Elley Duhé
- Producer: Joel Little

Imagine Dragons singles chronology
"Birds" (2019)	"Follow You" and "Cutthroat" (2021)	"Wrecked" (2021)

Music video
- "Follow You" on YouTube

"Follow You" is a song by American band Imagine Dragons. The song was released through Michelle Imagine Dragons, Imagine Dragons, and Kidinakorner on March 12, 2021, as one of the double lead singles from their fifth studio album Mercury – Act 1 alongside its B-side "Cutthroat". It was written by band members Dan Reynolds, Wayne Sermon, Ben McKee, and Daniel Platzman, alongside Joel Little, Elley Duhé. While Joel Little is credited as the song’s producer, the album’s executive producer, Rick Rubin, was also involved in the recording sessions for "Follow You" at his Shangri‑La studio in Malibu and played an influential role in its vocal production and overall sound.

== Background and release ==
In early March 2021, the band started teasing towards the release by posting various teasers before announcing the songs on March 8. "Follow You" and "Cutthroat" mark the first solo releases from Imagine Dragons since their 2018 album, Origins.

"Follow You" was inspired by frontman Dan Reynolds' relationship with his wife Aja Volkman. Reynolds wrote the song soon after receiving a "life-changing" text from Volkman, having not spoken to her in seven months, while on his way to finalize their divorce. About the writing process, he revealed, "I wrote 'Follow You' after we got back together. I wanted it to represent a love that is realistic. One where love isn't perfect but it endures."

This song is featured as a DLC in Fuser, released on June 15, 2021.

== Writing and Production ==
In a Song Exploder episode, Dan Reynolds said he began writing “Follow You” immediately after reconciling with his wife Aja Volkman. A demo emerged from a haunting synth and organ track sent by producer Joel Little, which inspired Reynolds to write lyrics centered on loyalty and emotional resilience. The final vocal heard in the released version was the original demo take. Reynolds described the recording space as "not a room that any studio engineer would ever recommend," but noted that when he attempted to re-record the vocal in a professional studio, it "didn't sound as cool", leading the band to retain the original demo vocal in the final mix.

After Reynolds sent the demo to the rest of the band, guitarist Wayne Sermon added parts from home, and they later recorded together at producer Rick Rubin’s Shangri-La studio in Malibu. Rubin encouraged Reynolds to push beyond his vocal comfort zone to heighten the emotional impact. The band experimented with a more live-sounding version featuring organic instrumentation, but ultimately decided against it. Reynolds explained that the live version gave him a feeling of a party, whereas the polished final version retained the emotional tone he was aiming for.

== Commercial performance ==
"Follow You" peaked at No. 68 on the Billboard Hot 100. The song also wrapped the group's quickest climb to No. 1 on Alternative Airplay, usurping the seven-week ascents for "Believer" in 2017 and "Natural" in 2018. That same week, it had 5.1 million audience impressions, up 15% from the previous week, according to MRC Data.

Nearly two months after leading Billboard's Alternative Airplay chart, "Follow You" went No. 1 on the all-rock-format, audience-based Rock & Alternative Airplay survey, rising 2–1 on the list dated June 19.

The song garnered 7 million audience impressions, up 2%, in the week ending June 13, according to MRC Data.

In September 2023, for the 35th anniversary of Alternative Airplay, Billboard published a list of the top 100 most successful songs in the chart's history; "Follow You" was ranked at No. 49.

== Music video ==
The music video for "Follow You" premiered on March 16, 2021. It features It's Always Sunny in Philadelphia stars Kaitlin Olson and Rob McElhenney. The concert depicted in the video was a birthday gift for McElhenney, although Imagine Dragons is Olson's favorite band, while McElhenney prefers The Killers. Both bands are based in Las Vegas. During the performance of "Follow You", Olson and McElhenney each imagine a series of increasingly wild fantasies involving the band. After the song ends, they begin to leave, prompting lead singer Dan Reynolds to tell them the band still has ten songs left to perform. The pair continues to exit, with a reference that they leave "before they play 'Radioactive'". The music video was filmed at the Venetian Theater in Las Vegas and directed by Matt Eastin.

== Track listings and formats ==
- 7" vinyl/CD single/digital download
1. "Follow You" – 2:55
2. "Cutthroat" – 2:49
- Digital download – Summer '21 Version
1. "Follow You" (Summer '21 Version) – 2:52
- Streaming – Summer '21 Version (Spotify edition)
1. "Follow You" (Summer '21 Version) – 2:52
2. "Follow You" – 2:56

== Personnel ==
Credits adapted from Tidal.

- Dan Reynolds – vocals, songwriting
- Wayne Sermon – songwriting, backing vocals, synthesizer & guitar
- Daniel Platzman – songwriting, drums, backing vocals
- Ben McKee – songwriting, bass guitar, backing vocals
- Joel Little – songwriting, production, recording engineering
- Elley Duhé – songwriting
- Fran Hall – songwriting
- John Hanes – engineering, mix engineering
- Şerban Ghenea – engineering, mixing
- Randy Merrill – mastering engineering

== Charts ==
=== Weekly charts ===
Weekly chart performance for "Follow You"
Chart (2021–2023)	Peak position
Austria (Ö3 Austria Top 40)	34
Belarus Airplay (TopHit)	98
Belgium (Ultratop 50 Flanders)	15
Belgium (Ultratop 50 Wallonia)	2
Canada Hot 100 (Billboard)	47
Canada CHR/Top 40 (Billboard)	40
Canada Hot AC (Billboard)	20
Canada Rock (Billboard)	33
CIS Airplay (TopHit)	4
Czech Republic Airplay (ČNS IFPI)	1
Czech Republic Singles Digital (ČNS IFPI)	14
Estonia Airplay (TopHit)	99
France (SNEP)	41
Germany (GfK)	49
Germany Airplay (BVMI)	2
Global 200 (Billboard)	66
Hungary (Single Top 40)	31
Italy (FIMI)	33
Japan Hot Overseas (Billboard)	18
Lebanon (Lebanese Top 20)	6
Lithuania (AGATA)	38
Netherlands (Dutch Top 40)	7
Netherlands (Single Top 100)	26
New Zealand Hot Singles (RMNZ)	5
Norway (VG-lista)	40
Poland Airplay (ZPAV)	1
Poland (Polish Airplay TV)	3
Portugal (AFP)	109
Russia Airplay (TopHit)	6
San Marino (SMRRTV Top 50)	13
Slovakia Airplay (ČNS IFPI)	1
Slovakia Singles Digital (ČNS IFPI)	18
Sweden (Sverigetopplistan)	78
Switzerland (Schweizer Hitparade)	23
Ukraine Airplay (TopHit)	4
UK Singles (Official Charts)	100
US Billboard Hot 100	68
US Adult Pop Airplay (Billboard)	11
US Hot Rock & Alternative Songs (Billboard)	7
US Pop Airplay (Billboard)	36
US Rock & Alternative Airplay (Billboard)	1

=== Monthly charts ===
Monthly chart performance for "Follow You"
Chart (2021)	Peak position
CIS Airplay (TopHit)	4
Czech Republic (Rádio – Top 100)	1
Czech Republic (Singles Digitál Top 100)	16
Russia Airplay (TopHit)	7
Slovakia (Rádio Top 100)	1
Slovakia (Singles Digitál Top 100)	18
Ukraine Airplay (TopHit)	7

=== Year-end charts ===
2021 year-end chart performance for "Follow You"
Chart (2021)	Position
Belgium (Ultratop Flanders)	38
Belgium (Ultratop Wallonia)	7
CIS Airplay (TopHit)	8
France (SNEP)	71
Global 200 (Billboard)	196
Italy (FIMI)	95
Netherlands (Dutch Top 40)	34
Netherlands (Single Top 100)	95
Poland (ZPAV)	21
Russia Airplay (TopHit)	12
Switzerland (Schweizer Hitparade)	40
Ukraine Airplay (TopHit)	31
US Adult Top 40 (Billboard)	36
US Hot Rock & Alternative Songs (Billboard)	15
US Rock Airplay (Billboard)	1

2022 year-end chart performance for "Follow You"
Chart (2022)	Position
CIS Airplay (TopHit)	89
Russia Airplay (TopHit)	143
Ukraine Airplay (TopHit)	53

2023 year-end chart performance for "Follow You"
Chart (2023)	Position
CIS Airplay (TopHit)	151
Ukraine Airplay (TopHit)	167

=== Decade-end charts ===
20s Decade-end chart performance for "Follow You"
Chart (2020–2024)	Position
CIS Airplay (TopHit)	23
Belarus Airplay (TopHit)	24
Russia Airplay (TopHit)	37
Ukraine Airplay (TopHit)	74

== Certifications ==
Region	Certification	Certified units/sales
Austria (IFPI Austria)	Platinum	30,000^{‡}
Brazil (Pro-Música Brasil)	Diamond	160,000^{‡}
Canada (Music Canada)	2× Platinum	160,000^{‡}
France (SNEP)	Diamond	333,333^{‡}
Germany (BVMI)	Gold	200,000^{‡}
Italy (FIMI)	Platinum	70,000^{‡}
New Zealand (RMNZ)	Gold	15,000^{‡}
Poland (ZPAV)	2× Platinum	100,000^{‡}
Portugal (AFP)	Platinum	10,000^{‡}
Spain (Promusicae)	Platinum	60,000^{‡}
United Kingdom (BPI)	Silver	200,000^{‡}
United States (RIAA)	Platinum	1,000,000^{‡}
^{‡} Sales+streaming figures based on certification alone.

== Release history ==
Region	Date	Format	Version	Label	Ref.
Various	March 12, 2021	7" vinyl; CD; digital download	Original	Kidinakorner; Interscope	
Italy	March 12, 2021	Contemporary hit radio	Original	Universal	
United States	March 23, 2021	Alternative radio	Original	Interscope	
Various	June 4, 2021	Digital download	Summer '21 Version	Kidinakorner; Interscope	
Various	June 4, 2021	Streaming (Spotify edition)	Summer '21 Version	Kidinakorner; Interscope	
United States	October 19, 2021	Contemporary hit radio	Original	Kidinakorner; Interscope	
