= Elisa discography =

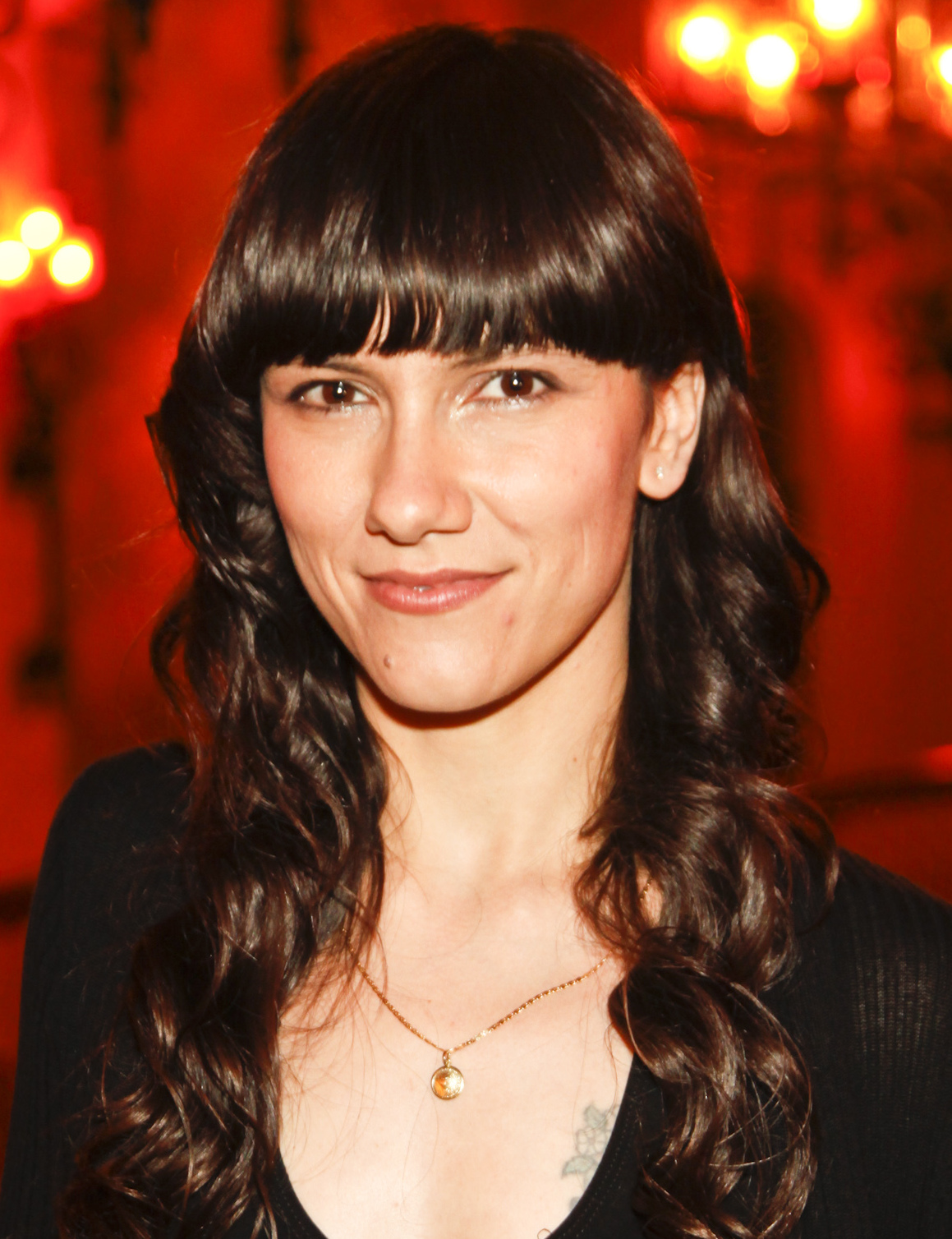
- Studio albums: 11
- Extended plays: 1
- Soundtrack albums: 1
- Live albums: 3
- Compilation albums: 7
- Singles: 89
- Video albums: 4
- Music videos: 68

The discography of Elisa, an Italian singer-songwriter, consists of eleven studio albums, forty-one singles, five compilation albums and five DVDs.

== Albums ==
=== Studio albums ===
Title	Album details	Peak chart positions		Sales	Certification
Title	Album details	ITA	SWI	Sales	Certification
Pipes & Flowers	Released: 22 September 1997; Label: Sugar; Formats: CD, Cassette	9	—	ITA: 390,000	ITA: 3× Platinum
Asile's World	Released: 5 May 2000; Label: Sugar; Formats: CD, Cassette	5	—	ITA: 250,000	ITA: 2× Platinum
Then Comes the Sun	Released: 9 November 2001; Label: Sugar; Formats: CD, Cassette	10	—		ITA: 3× Platinum
Lotus	Released: 14 November 2003; Label: Sugar; Formats: CD, LP, Cassette, SACD	2	—	ITA: 400,000	ITA: 4× Platinum
Pearl Days	Released: 15 October 2004; Label: Sugar; Formats: CD	2	—		ITA: 2× Platinum
Heart	Released: 13 November 2009; Label: Sugar; Format: Download	1	—		ITA: 3× Platinum
Ivy	Released: 30 November 2010; Label: Sugar; Formats: CD, CD+DVD, download	4	—		ITA: Platinum
L'anima vola	Released: 15 October 2013; Label: Sugar; Formats: CD, download	1	—		ITA: 2× Platinum
On	Released: 25 March 2016; Label: Sugar; Formats: CD, download	1	—		ITA: Platinum
Diari aperti	Released: 26 October 2018; Label: Island; Formats: CD, download	2	53		ITA: 4× Platinum
Ritorno al futuro/Back to the Future	Released: 18 February 2022; Label: Island; Formats: CD, download	1	31		ITA: Platinum

=== Compilation albums ===
Title	Album details	Peak chart positions		Certification
Title	Album details	ITA	SWI	Certification
Elisa	Released: 2002; Label: Sugar; Formats: CD	—	84	
Soundtrack '96–'06	Released: 17 November 2006; Label: Sugar; Formats: CD, CD+DVD, LP, download	1	58	ITA: Diamond
Caterpillar	Released: 20 July 2007; Label: Sugar; Formats: CD, download	34	—	
Dancing	Released: 15 July 2008; Label: Sugar; Formats: CD, download	—	—	
Steppin' on Water	Released: 13 March 2012; Label: Sugar; Formats: CD, download	—	—	
Soundtrack '97–'17	Released: 1 September 2017; Label: Sugar; Formats: CD, CD+DVD, download	4	—	ITA: Gold
Intimate – Recordings at Abbey Road Studios	Released: 12 December 2023; Label: Island; Formats: CD, download	9	—	ITA: Platinum

=== Live albums ===
Title	Album details	Peak chart positions
Title	Album details	ITA
Soundtrack Live '96–'06	Released: 16 November 2007; Label: Sugar; Formats: CD+DVD	11
Back to the Future – Part I	Released: 15 September 2022; Label: Island; Formats: CD, digital	10

=== Video albums ===
- Lotus (2003)
- Pearl Days (2004)
- Soundtrack '96-'06 (2006)
- Soundtrack Live '96–'06 (2007)

== Extended plays ==
Year	Title
2000	Asile's World
2002	Broken
2005	Swan
2006	Teach Me Again
2007	Dancing
2019	Secret Diaries

== Singles ==
=== As lead artist ===
Title	Year	Peak chart position						Certifications	Album
Title	Year	ITA	CAN	GER	NED	SPA	SWI	Certifications	Album
"Sleeping in Your Hand"	1997	5	—	—	91	—	—		Pipes & Flowers
"Labyrinth"	1997	12	—	—	—	—	—		Pipes & Flowers
"Mr. Want"	1998	—	—	—	—	—	—		Pipes & Flowers
"Cure Me"	1998	—	—	—	—	—	—		Pipes & Flowers
"Gift"	2000	26	—	—	—	—	—		Asile's World
"Happiness Is Home"	2000	—	—	—	—	—	—		Asile's World
"Asile's World"	2000	—	—	—	—	—	—		Asile's World
"Luce (tramonti a nord est)"	2001	1	—	—	91	12	70	FIMI: Platinum	Asile's World
"Rainbow"	2002	5	—	—	—	—	—		Then Comes the Sun
"Time"	2002	55	—	—	—	—	—		Then Comes the Sun
"Almeno tu nell'universo"	2003	1	—	—	—	—	—		Remember Me, My Love
"Broken"	2003	3	—	—	—	—	—		Lotus
"Una poesia anche per te"	2005	2	—	—	—	—	—	FIMI: Platinum	Pearl Days
"Swan"	2005	3	—	—	—	—	—	FIMI: Gold	Melissa P.
"Teach Me Again" (with Tina Turner)	2006	1	—	43	—	—	41	FIMI: Gold	All the Invisible Children
"Gli ostacoli del cuore" (with Ligabue)	2006	1	—	—	—	—	—	FIMI: Platinum	Soundtrack '96-'06
"Eppure sentire (Un senso di te)"	2007	1	—	—	—	—	—	FIMI: Platinum	Soundtrack '96-'06
"Stay"	2007	11	—	—	—	—	—		Soundtrack '96-'06
"Qualcosa che non c'è"	2007	17	—	—	—	—	—		Soundtrack '96-'06
"Ti vorrei sollevare" (with Giuliano Sangiorgi)	2009	1	—	—	—	—	—	FIMI: 2× Platinum	Heart
"Anche se non trovi le parole"	2010	33	—	—	—	—	—		Heart
"Someone to Love"	2010	—	—	—	—	—	—		Heart
"Nostalgia"	2010	34	—	—	—	—	—		Ivy
"Sometime Ago"	2011	—	—	—	—	—	—		Ivy
"Love Is Requited"	2011	37	—	—	—	—	—		Someday This Pain Will Be Useful to You
"Ancora qui" (with Ennio Morricone)	2013	41	—	—	—	—	—		Django Unchained and L'anima vola
"L'anima vola"	2013	2	—	—	—	—	—	FIMI: 2× Platinum	L'anima vola
"Ecco che"	2013	22	—	—	—	—	—	FIMI: Gold	L'anima vola
"Un filo di seta negli abissi"	2014	39	—	—	—	—	—	FIMI: Gold	L'anima vola
"Pagina bianca"	2014	—	—	—	—	—	—		L'anima vola
"Maledetto labirinto"	2014	—	—	—	—	—	—		L'anima vola
"A modo tuo"	2014	18	—	—	—	—	—	FIMI: 2× Platinum	L'anima vola
"No Hero"	2016	8	—	—	—	—	—	FIMI: 3× Platinum	On
"Love Me Forever"	2016	86	—	—	—	—	—	FIMI: Gold	On
"Bruciare per te"	2016	90	—	—	—	—	—	FIMI: Platinum	On
"Ogni istante"	2017	40	—	—	—	—	—	FIMI: Platinum	Non-album singles
"Will We Be Strangers"	2018	—	—	—	—	—	—		Non-album singles
"Quelli che restano" (with Francesco De Gregori)	2018	38	—	—	—	—	—		Diari aperti
"Se piovesse il tuo nome" (solo or with Calcutta)	2018	4	—	—	—	—	—	FIMI: 4× Platinum	Diari aperti
"Anche fragile"	2019	18	—	—	—	—	—	FIMI: 2× Platinum	Diari aperti
"Vivere tutte le vite" (with Carl Brave)	2019	22	—	—	—	—	—	FIMI: 2× Platinum	Diari aperti
"Tua per sempre"	2019	88	—	—	—	—	—	FIMI: Gold	Diari aperti
"Blu Part II" (with Rkomi)	2019	75	—	—	—	—	—	FIMI: Gold	Diari aperti (Segreti svelati)
"Soul"	2019	—	—	—	—	—	—		Diari aperti (Segreti svelati)
"Andrà tutto bene" (with Tommaso Paradiso)	2020	27	—	—	—	—	—		Non-album single
"Seta"	2021	—	—	—	—	—	—		Ritorno al futuro/Back to the Future
"O forse sei tu"	2022	4	—	—	—	—	37	FIMI: 2× Platinum	Ritorno al futuro/Back to the Future
"Litoranea" (featuring Matilda De Angelis)	2022	—	—	—	—	—	—	FIMI: Gold	Ritorno al futuro/Back to the Future
"Palla al centro" (with Jovanotti)	2022	—	—	—	—	—	—		Ritorno al futuro/Back to the Future
"Come te nessuno mai"	2022	—	—	—	—	—	—		Ritorno al futuro/Back to the Future
"Diamanti" (with Negramaro and Jovanotti)	2023	40	—	—	—	—	—	FIMI: Platinum	Free Love
"Quando nevica"	2023	38	—	—	—	—	—		Intimate – Recording at Abbey Road Studios
"Dillo solo al buio"	2024	47	—	—	—	—	—	FIMI: Gold	TBA
"Amore è"	2026	—	—	—	—	—	—		Non-album single
"—" denotes a single that did not chart or was not released.

=== As featured artist ===
Title	Year	Peak chart positions		Certification	Album
Title	Year	ITA	US Rock	Certification	Album
"Nottetempo" (La Comitiva featuring Ice One, Frankie HI-NRG MC, Malaisa ed Elisa)	1999	—	—		Medicina buona
"Nessuna certezza" (Tiromancino featuring Elisa & Meg)	2003	—	—		In continuo movimento
"Vivere forte" (Avion Travel featuring Elisa)	2003	—	—		Poco mossi gli altri bacini
"Opera" (Jade featuring Elisa)	2005	—	—		In Silence
"Domani 21/04.09" (as a member of Artisti uniti per l'Abruzzo)	2009	1	—	FIMI: Multi-Platinum	Non-album singles
"Donna d'Onna" (as a member of Amiche per l'Abruzzo)	2010	8	—		Non-album singles
"Basta così" (Negramaro featuring Elisa)	2011	7	—	FIMI: Platinum	Casa 69
"A muso duro" (Italia Loves Emilia)	2012	20	—		Italia Loves Emilia
"We Are Incurable Romantics" (Ozark Henry featuring Elisa)	2014	28	—		Stay Gold
"Vain" (Big Fish featuring Elisa)	2016	—	—		Doner Bombers Vol. 4
"Piccola anima" (Ermal Meta featuring Elisa)	2017	54	—	FIMI: Platinum	Vietato morire
"Da sola / In the Night" (Takagi & Ketra featuring Tommaso Paradiso & Elisa)	2018	12	—	FIMI: Platinum	Non-album single
"Blu" (Rkomi featuring Elisa)	2019	9	—	FIMI: 2× Platinum	Dove gli occhi non-arrivano
"Birds" (Imagine Dragons featuring Elisa)	2019	66	30	RIAA: Gold; FIMI: Platinum; SNEP: Platinum; ZPAV: Platinum	Origins
"Neon – Le ali" (Marracash featuring Elisa)	2020	5	—	FIMI: Platinum	Persona
"Volente o nolente" (Ligabue featuring Elisa)	2020	60	—	FIMI: Gold	7
"Rubini" (Mahmood featuring Elisa)	2021	31	—	FIMI: Platinum	Ghettolimpo
"Ghosts (How Can I Move On)" (Muse featuring Elisa)	2022	—	—		Will of the People
"Tilt" (Zef e Marz featuring Elisa & La Rappresentante di Lista)	2023	—	—		Non-album single
"Canzoni per gli altri" (Federica Abbate featuring Elisa)	2023	—	—		Canzoni per gli altri
"Rimani Qui" (Andrea Bocelli with Elisa)	2024	—	—		Duets (30th Anniversary)
"Nonostante tutto" (Cesare Cremonini with Elisa)	2025	17	—	FIMI: Platinum	Alaska Baby (2025 edition)
"Ricordi" (Blanco with Elisa)	2026	28	—		Ma'
"—" denotes a single that did not chart or was not released.

=== Promotional singles ===
Title	Year	Peak chart positions	Certification	Album
Title	Year	ITA	Certification	Album
"A Feast for Me"	1997	—		Pipes & the Flowers
"Heaven Out of Hell"	2001	—		Then Comes the Sun
"Dancing"	2002	33		Then Comes the Sun and Dancing
"Electricity"	2004	—		Lotus
"Together"	2004	—		Pearl Days
"The Waves"	2004	—		Pearl Days
"Promettimi"	2018	52	FIMI: Platinum	Diari aperti
"Three Little Birds" (with Shablo)	2020	—		Jammin Marley EP Vol. 1
"Quello che manca" (featuring Rkomi)	2022	48		Ritorno al futuro/Back to the Future

== Other album appearances ==
Title	Year	Other artist(s)	Album
"Rachel and the Storm"	2004	Casa del Vento	Al di la degli alberi
"Ma quando dici amore"	2005	Ron	Ma quando dici amore
"La voce del silenzio" (Live)	2008	Andrea Bocelli	Vivere. Live in Tuscany
"Dagli sbagli si impara"	2013	Fabri Fibra	Guerra e pace
"Vieni a vivere con me"	2013	Luca Carboni	Fisico & politico
"Pop-Hoolista"	2014	Fedez	Pop-Hoolista
"La signora del quinto piano #1522"	2015	Carmen Consoli, Emma, Nada, Irene Grandi	L'abitudine di tornare
"Realize"	2015	The Kolors	Out
"E la luna bussò"	2016	Loredana Bertè	Amici non ne ho… ma amiche sì!
"Destinazione paradiso"	2016	Gianluca Grignani	Una strada in mezzo al cielo
"Memole dolce Memole"	2018	Cristina D'Avena	Duets Forever
"Amore impossibile"	2018	Tiromancino, Mannarino	Fino a qui
"Gli ostacoli del cuore"	2018	Giorgia	Pop Heart
"Auschwitz"	2019	None	Note di viaggio – Capitolo 1: venite avanti…
"L'amore è nell'aria stasera"	2019	Edoardo Leo, Stefano Fresi, Marco Mengoni	The Lion King
"Quando il destino chiamerà"	2019	None	The Lion King
"Lasciati"	2019	Subsonica	Microchip temporale
"Yo no tengo nada"	2020	Francesca Michielin	Feat (stato di natura)
"C'eravamo tanto amati"	2021	Tropico	Non esiste amore a Napoli
"Luce (tramonti a nord est)"	2021	Zucchero	Discover
"Bloody Mary"	2021	Giorgio Poi	Gommapiuma
"Senza sogni"	2021	Guè	Guesus
"D10S"	2022	Luchè	Dove volano le aquile
"Laica preghiera"	2022	Marlene Kuntz	Karma Clima
"Consequence"	2022	O.R.k.	Screamnasium
"Monet"	2023	Rose Villain	Radio Gotham
"Hollowed"	2023	Soen	Memorial
"Aurore boreali"	2024	Cesare Cremonini	Alaska Baby

== Songwriting credits ==
Title	Year	Artist(s)	Album
"Anyway"	1999	Filippa Giordano	Passioni
"Fly Me Away"	1999	Filippa Giordano	Passioni
"World Has Got the Fever"	2000	Gazosa	Gazosa
"Finchè vivrò"	2002	Dennis Fantina	Dennis Fantina
"Elettra's Magic Stick"	2006	Rita Marcotulli	The Light Side of the Moon
"Distratto"	2012	Francesca Michielin	Riflessi di me
"Sola"	2012	Francesca Michielin	Riflessi di me
"Se cadrai"	2012	Francesca Michielin	Riflessi di me
"Riflessi di me"	2012	Francesca Michielin	Riflessi di me
"Indelebile"	2012	Francesca Michielin	Riflessi di me
"Tutto quello che ho"	2012	Francesca Michielin	Riflessi di me
"Non mi dire"	2012	Francesca Michielin	Riflessi di me
"Vivendo adesso"	2014	Francesco Renga	Tempo reale
"Vivere a colori"	2016	Alessandra Amoroso	Vivere a colori
"Comunque andare"	2016	Alessandra Amoroso	Vivere a colori
"La strada verso casa"	2016	Lele	Costruire
"Se ancora c'è"	2017	Federica Carta	Federica
"Se ti sembra poco"	2017	Gianni Morandi	D'amore d'autore
"Mascara"	2019	Emma	Fortuna
"Vertigine"	2021	Elodie	OK. Respira
"Bagno a mezzanotte"	2022	Elodie	OK. Respira
"Proiettili (ti mangio il cuore)"	2022	Elodie	OK. Respira
"Senza confine"	2023	Giorgia	Blu
"A fari spenti"	2023	Elodie	Red Light
"Senza farmi male"	2024	Mina	Gassa d'amante
"Un alba rossa"	2024	Cesare Cremonini	Alaska Baby
"Aurore boreali"	2024	Cesare Cremonini	Alaska Baby
"Mi ami mi odi"	2025	Elodie	Mi ami mi odi
