= List of songs recorded by Elisa =

Original songs and cover songs by the Italian singer-songwriter Elisa Toffoli

The following is a list of Elisa songs. Elisa Toffoli is an Italian singer-songwriter, performing under the mononym Elisa. She is one of few Italian musicians to write and record mainly in English.

== Original songs ==
Song title	Album(s) / single(s)	First released
"A Feast for Me"	Pipes & Flowers	2002
"A Little Over Zero"	Asile's World / Dancing	2000
"A Prayer"	Lotus	2003
"Anche se non trovi le parole"	Heart	2009
"And All I Need"	Heart	2009
"Asile's World"	Asile's World	2000
"Beautiful Night"	Lotus	2003
"Bitter Words"	Pearl Days	2004
"Broken"	Lotus / Dancing	2003
"Chameleon"	Asile's World	2000
"City Lights"	Pearl Days / Dancing	2004
"Coincidences"	Heart	2009
"Come & Sit"	Asile's World	2000
"Come Speak To Me"	Asile's World	2001
"Creature"	Asile's World	2000
"Cure Me"	Pipes & Flowers	1997
"Dancing"	Then Comes the Sun / Dancing	2002
"Dot in the Universe"	Heart	2009
"Eppure sentire (Un senso di te)"	Soundtrack '96-'06	2006
"Electricity"	Lotus	2003
"Fairy Girl"	Then Comes the Sun	2002
"Fever"	Then Comes the Sun	2002
"Forgiveness"	Heart (with Antony Hegarty)	2009
"Gift"	Asile's World	2000
"Gli ostacoli del cuore"	Soundtrack '96-'06 (with Ligabue)	2006
"Hablame"	Elisa	2002
"Happiness Is Home"	Asile's World	2000
"Heaven Out of Hell"	Then Comes the Sun	2002
"I Know"	Pearl Days	2004
"In the Green"	Pearl Days	2004
"Inside a Flower"	Pipes & Flowers	1997
"Interlude"	Lotus	2003
"It Is What It Is"	Then Comes the Sun	2002
"Joy"	Pearl Days	2004
"Just Some Order"	Asile's World	2000
"Labyrinth"	Pipes & Flowers	1997
"Life Goes On"	Pearl Days / Dancing	2004
"Lisert"	Heart	2009
"Little Eye"	Asile's World	2000
"Love Is Requited"	Love Is Requited	2011
"Luce (Tramonti A Nord-Est)"	Asile's World	2001
"Lullaby"	Broken EP	2003
"Mr Want"	Pipes & Flowers	1997
"New Kiss"	Pipes & Flowers	1997
"Nonostante Tutto" (Cesare Cremonini and Elisa		
"Pearl Days"	Pearl Days	2004
"Poems by God"	Heart	2009
"Qualcosa che non c'è"	Soundtrack '96-'06 / Dancing	2006
"Rainbow"	Then Comes the Sun / Dancing	2002
"Rock Your Soul"	Then Comes the Sun / Dancing	2002
"Seven Times"	Asile's World	2000
"Shadow Zone"	Pipes & Flowers	1997
"Simplicity"	Then Comes the Sun	2002
"Sleeping in Your Hand"	Pipes & Flowers	1997
"So Delicate So Pure"	Pipes & Flowers	1997
"Someone to Love"	Heart	2009
"Stay"	Soundtrack '96-'06 / Dancing	2006
"Stranger"	Then Comes the Sun / Dancing	2002
"Teach Me Again"	Teach Me Again (with Tina Turner)	2006
"Tell Me"	Pipes & Flowers	1997
"The Big Dipper"	Heart	2009
"The Marriage"	Pipes & Flowers	1997
"The Waves"	Pearl Days / Dancing	2004
"The Window"	Then Comes the Sun	2003
"This Knot"	Heart	2009
"Ti vorrei sollevare"	Heart (with Giuliano Sangiorgi)	2009
"Tic Tac"	Asile's World	2000
"Time"	Then Comes the Sun	2002
"Together"	Pearl Days	2004
"Una poesia anche per te"	Pearl Days / Dancing	2004
"Upside Down"	Asile's World	2000
"Vortexes"	Heart	2009
"We Are Incurable Romantics" (Ozark Henry feat. Elisa)	We Are Incurable Romantics (Ozark Henry)	2014
"Written in Your Eyes"	Pearl Days	2004
"Yashal"	Lotus / Dancing	2003
"Your Manifesto"	Heart	2009

== Covers ==
Title	Album(s)	Year released	Original artist
"Baby Can I Hold You"	Live Cover	2001	Tracy Chapman
"Almeno tu nell'universo"	Lotus	2003	Mia Martini
"Hallelujah"	Lotus	2003	Leonard Cohen
"Femme Fatale"	Lotus	2003	The Velvet Underground
"(Sittin' on) the Dock of the Bay"	Broken EP	2003	Otis Redding
"Redemption Song"	Broken EP	2003	Bob Marley
"People Are Strange"	Live Cover	2006	The Doors
"Wild Horses"	Caterpillar	2007	Rolling Stones
"Ode to My Family"	Live Cover	2007	The Cranberries
"Wuthering Heights"	Live Cover	2008	Kate Bush
"What's Up?"	Live Cover	2008	4 Non Blondes
"Calling You"	Live Cover	2008	Jevetta Steele
"Mercedes Benz"	Live Cover	2008	Janis Joplin
"Mad World"	Heart	2009	Tears For Fears
"River" (with Terra Naomi)	Live Cover	2009	Joni Mitchell
"1979"	Ivy	2010	The Smashing Pumpkins
"Ho Messo via"	Ivy	2010	Ligabue
"I Never Came"	Ivy	2010	Queens of the Stone Age
"Pour Que l'Amour Me Quitte"	Ivy	2010	Camille
"Lilac Wine"	Live Cover	2011	Jeff Buckley
"Someone Like You"	Live Cover	2011	Adele
"Rolling in the Deep"	Live Cover	2011	Adele
"The Scientist"	Live Cover	2011	Coldplay
"The Sound of Silence"	Live Cover	2011	Simon & Garfunkel
