= Intimate – Recordings at Abbey Road Studios =

Greatest hits album by Elisa
- Released: 8 December 2023
- Studios: Abbey Road, London
- Length: 60:19
- Languages: English; Italian
- Label: Universal Music Group
- Producer: Dardust

Elisa chronology
Back to the Future Live (2022)	Intimate – Recordings at Abbey Road Studios (2023)

Singles from Intimate – Recordings at Abbey Road Studios
- 1. "Quando nevica" Released: 24 November 2023

Intimate – Recordings at Abbey Road Studios is the seventh official greatest hits compilation by the Italian singer Elisa, released by Universal Music Group on 8 December 2023.

The recording project included the rearrangement and vocal re-modeling of several songs from the singer-songwriter's discography, as well as the inclusion of Christmas music tracks, including a cover of "Silent Night" and two previously unreleased tracks "Quando nevica" and "Buon Natale anche a te".

== Background ==
After the release of the eleventh studio album Ritorno al futuro/Back to the Future and the related live album Back to the Future Live, taken from the promotional tour, between December 2022 and January 2023 Elisa embarked on An Intimate Night, a tour held exclusively in theaters and featuring Italian musician and producer Dardust as an artistic collaborator and guest on all dates, revisiting songs from the singer-songwriter's discography. On June 3 and 4, 2023, she performed An Intimate Arena at the Arena di Verona, which took over the format of An Intimate Night and continued the artistic partnership with Dardust. In September 2023, she announced An Intimate Christmas, a double show at the Mediolanum Forum in Milan in collaboration with Dardust on December 15 and 16, 2023.

== Composition ==
The recording project, produced entirely by Dardust, was recorded at London's Abbey Road Studios in the summer of 2023 with a live orchestra. Elisa said that she drew inspiration in the making of the project from the An Intimate Night tour, both from the point of view of recorded sounds and in the use of the singer's own vocals. Through her own social networks, the singer explained the recording process and the work with Dardust:

"An Intimate Night was originally meant to be a small theater tour and then we all realized that something big had happened. I don't know what it is, I smile because like all the greatest things that have happened to me, deep down I can't explain it. But your affection and love overwhelmed us. [...] After all the Back to the Future Live concerts, which was a very long tour, we started a new chapter without almost realizing it, a chapter that you made important. One that made me put my voice even more in the center and step deeply into the shoes of the singer in me. A beacon pointed in the dark to exchange that light, those emotions and especially the strength of that intimacy. We exchanged the courage to take away. [...] The lesson this time is that you don't need superstructures, that simplicity was enough then and is still enough now, and that you have to give yourself to the world for who you are without fear of not being or giving enough. I want to thank Dardust, because without him there would have been none of this. He is the one who had a new vision for my music, who in these arrangements created a magical balance between virtuosity and essentiality. He is the one who, by giving me all this space, pushed me to the maximum potential of my voice. We went to one of the most legendary studios in the world, Abbey Road, and recorded all the songs you heard during those concerts plus two new songs we wrote especially for this record. To forever remember something beautiful, something that made us feel good."

— Elisa Toffoli about the album conception

== Track listing ==
Credits adapted to data reported on the SIAE website. All songs are produced by Dardust.

Intimate – Recording at Abbey Road Studios track listing
No.	Title	Lyrics	Music	Length
1.	"Overture / Un filo di seta negli abissi"	Elisa Toffoli	Toffoli; Dario Faini	4:56
2.	"Quando nevica"	Edoardo D'Erme; Faini; Toffoli	D'Erme; Faini; Toffoli	3:27
3.	"L'anima vola"	Toffoli	Toffoli	4:09
4.	"Luce (tramonti a nord est)"	Adelmo Fornaciari; Toffoli	Toffoli	4:20
5.	"Eppure sentire (Un senso di te)"	Toffoli	Paolo Buonvino	3:42
6.	"Anche fragile"	Toffoli	Toffoli	3:55
7.	"Una poesia anche per te"	Toffoli	Toffoli	5:26
8.	"Dancing"	Toffoli	Toffoli	5:44
9.	"Labyrinth"	Catherine Marie Warner; Toffoli	Toffoli	5:05
10.	"No Hero"	Allan D. Rich; Jud Friedman; Toffoli	Toffoli	4:18
11.	"Qualcosa che non c'è"	Toffoli	Toffoli	4:35
12.	"O forse sei tu"	Davide Petrella; Toffoli	Toffoli	3:52
13.	"Se piovesse il tuo nome"	Faini; D'Erme	Vanni Casagrande; D'Erme; Faini	3:24
14.	"A modo tuo"	Luciano Ligabue	Ligabue	5:19
15.	"Together"	Toffoli	Toffoli	4:16
16.	"Ancora qui"	Toffoli	Ennio Morricone	4:54
17.	"Silent Night"	Joseph Mohr	Franz Xaver Gruber	4:25
18.	"Buon Natale anche a te"	Alessandro Raina; Toffoli	Toffoli	3:34
Total length:				60:19

Intimate – Recording at Abbey Road Studios streaming track listing
No.	Title	Lyrics	Music	Length
19.	"Promettimi"	Toffoli	Toffoli	4:03
20.	"Come te nessuno mai"	Petrella; Toffoli	Petrella; Toffoli	4:50
21.	"Stay"	Toffoli	Toffoli	4:09
22.	"Seta"	Petrella	Faini; Toffoli	3:51
23.	"Palla al centro"	Toffoli	Faini; Casagrande; Toffoli	4:25
24.	"Gli ostacoli del cuore"	Ligabue	Ligabue	3:59
Total length:				85:36

== Charts ==
Weekly chart performance for Intimate – Recordings at Abbey Road Studios
Chart (2023)	Peak position
Italian Albums (FIMI)	9

== Certifications ==
Certifications for Intimate – Recordings at Abbey Road Studios
Region	Certification	Certified units/sales
Italy (FIMI)	Platinum	50,000^{‡}
^{‡} Sales+streaming figures based on certification alone.
