= Dancing (album) =

Compilation album by Elisa
- Released: 15 July 2008 (US); 25 August 2008 (Canada)
- Recorded: 2001–2004
- Length: 63:03
- Language: English
- Label: Sugar; Universal Records
- Producer: Elisa; Glen Ballard; Corrado Rustici

Elisa chronology
Caterpillar (2007)	Dancing (2008)	Heart (2009)

Singles from Dancing
- 1. "Dancing e.p." Released: 2007; 2. "Rainbow" Released: July 2008; 3. "Rock Your Soul" Released: May 2009

Dancing is a compilation album by Italian singer Elisa, released on 15 July 2008 in CD format in the United States and Canada. A digital version on iTunes was released on 17 June 2008 in the United States and on 25 August 2008 in Canada.

The album, released as part of an effort to introduce Elisa to North American audiences, is a compilation of recordings (some remixed) from previously released albums dating back to 2000.

Released of the full album was preceded by the released of an EP featuring the song "Dancing" which was released in December 2007. Beside the title track, the EP includes "Rock Your Soul" (also included on the Dancing album), along with a live version of '"Dancing'" recorded at the iTunes Festival in London.

The first single from the album is Rainbow in a new remix edition by Glen Ballard.

== Track origins ==
The songs on the album were chosen by Elisa and are culled from most of her albums, with the exception of her first, Pipes & Flowers.

There is only one song from her second album Asile's World (2000): "A Little Over Zero." However this is a remixed version of the original.

From the album Then Comes the Sun (2001) comes "Dancing", "Stranger", "Rainbow" and "Rock Your Soul".

The songs from Lotus (2003) are: "Broken", "Electricity"; "Yashal" and the much-covered Leonard Cohen song, "Hallelujah".

The songs from Pearl Days (2004) are: "The Waves", "City Lights" and "Life Goes On".

Three additional tracks (sources unknown) are included as bonus tracks on the Canadian CD issue: "Stay", "Una Poesia Anche Per Te" (Italian version of "Life Goes On") and "Qualcosa che non c'è". Another track, "Wild Horses", was available only in the US through iTunes.

== Tour ==
To support the album, Elisa toured the United States and Canada between 29 October and 24 November 2008.

== Track listing ==
All songs written by Elisa except where noted.

No.	Title	Length
1.	"The Waves"	4:10
2.	"Dancing"	5:36
3.	"Stranger"	3:54
4.	"Broken"	4:20
5.	"A Little Over Zero"	5:30
6.	"City Lights"	3:53
7.	"Rainbow"	4:59
8.	"Rock Your Soul"	5:01
9.	"Life Goes On"	5:15
10.	"Electricity"	4:10
11.	"Yashal"	5:28
12.	"Hallelujah" (Leonard Cohen's cover; writer: Cohen)	7:26
13.	"Dancing edit" (Edit)	3:36

US iTunes Bonus Tracks
No.	Title	Length
14.	"Wild Horses" (Rolling Stones's cover; writers: Mick Jagger, Keith Richards)	5:40

Canadian Bonus Tracks
No.	Title	Length
15.	"Stay"	3:59
16.	"Una Poesia Anche Per Te"	5:14
17.	"Qualcosa Che Non C'è"	3:59

== Release dates ==
Country	Date	Label	Format
United States	15 July 2008	Universal/Sugar	CD, Digital download
Canada	25 August 2008	Universal/Sugar	CD, Digital download
UK	18 December 2008	Universal/Sugar	Digital download

== Personnel ==
- Andrea Fontana - Arranger, Drums, Percussion
- Andrew Duckles - Viola
- Benmont Tench - Chamberlin, Organ, Piano
- Christian Rigano - Arranger, Organ (Hammond), Piano
- Corrado Rustici - Arranger, Editing, Guitar, Keyboards, Producer, Programming, Treatments
- David Frazer - Mixing
- Donald Ferrone - Bass
- Emanuele Donnini - Mixing
- Enrique Gonzalez Müller - Assistant, Cuatro
- Glen Ballard - Guitar, Keyboards, Producer
- Guido Andreani - Arranger, Engineer
- Jimmy Johnson - Bass
- John Cuniberti - Mastering
- Josephina Vergara - Violin
- Kevin Mills - Assistant Engineer
- Lance Morrison - Bass
- Mark Valentine - Assistant Engineer
- Matt Chamberlain - Drums, Percussion
- Matt Read - Artwork
- Maurice Grants - Celli
- Max Gelsi - Arranger, Bass (Electric)
- Michael Landau - Guitar
- Michele Richards - Violin
- Pasquale Minieri - Arranger, Mixing, Producer
- Paula Hochhalter - Celli
- Randy Kerber - Keyboards, Piano
- Scott Campbell - Engineer
- Sean Hurley - Bass
- Stephen Marcussen - Mastering
- Stewart Whitmore - Digital Editing
- Suzie Katayama - String Arrangements, String Conductor
- Tim Pierce - Guitar
- Turtle Island String Quartet - Strings
- Veronique Vial - Photography
- William Malina - Engineer, Mixing
