= Ivy (Elisa album) =

Studio album by Elisa
- Released: November 30, 2010
- Recorded: 2010
- Genre: Acoustic
- Length: 74:26
- Language: English; Italian
- Label: Sugar
- Producer: Elisa

Elisa chronology
Heart (2009)	Ivy (2010)	Steppin' On Water (2012)

Singles from Ivy
- 1. "Nostalgia" Released: November 19, 2010; 2. "Sometime Ago" Released: January 28, 2011

Ivy is the seventh studio album by Italian singer Elisa, released on November 30, 2010 by Sugar Music. Ivy marks Elisa's second acoustic album (the first being Lotus) and features three new songs, some covers and acoustic reworks of her previous songs. The album was released both digitally and on CD+DVD, with the DVD containing Ivy – the Film, a documentary featuring the making-of the album as well as live performances by the singer.

== Track listing ==
From M & B Music blog.

No.	Title	Lyrics	Music	Length
1.	"Lullaby"	Elisa	Elisa	4:11
2.	"Sometime Ago"	Elisa	Elisa	4:27
3.	"Fresh Air"	Elisa	Elisa	3:11
4.	"Ti vorrei sollevare"	Elisa	Elisa	4:28
5.	"Una poesia anche per te"	Elisa	Elisa	5:21
6.	"Nostalgia"	Elisa	Elisa · Andrea Rigonat	4:54
7.	"Qualcosa che non c'è"	Elisa	Elisa	5:19
8.	"Rainbow"	Elisa	Elisa	4:30
9.	"Gli ostacoli del cuore"	Ligabue	Ligabue	4:24
10.	"1979" (The Smashing Pumpkins Cover)	Billy Corgan	Corgan	4:22
11.	"Pour Que l'Amour Me Quitte" (Camille cover, feat. Giorgia)	Camille	Camille	3:15
12.	"Anche tu, anche se (non-trovi le parole)" (feat. Fabri Fibra)	Elisa · Fabri Fibra	Elisa · Rigonat	5:16
13.	"It Is What It Is"	Elisa	Elisa	4:22
14.	"Eppure sentire (Un senso di te)"	Elisa	Paolo Buonvino	3:40
15.	"Ho Messo Via" (Ligabue Cover)	Ligabue	Ligabue	3:50
16.	"I Never Came" (Queens of the Stone Age Cover)	Joey Castillo · Joshua Homme · Troy Van Leeuwen	Castillo · Homme · Van Leeuwen	4:23
17.	"Forgiveness"	Elisa	Elisa	4:26

== Musicians ==
- Elisa – vocals, piano
- Max Gelsi – bass
- Andrea Rigonat – guitar, programming
- Andrea Fontana – drums, percussions
- Gianluca Ballarin – organ
- Simone Bertolotti – keyboards, mellotron
- Rita Marcotulli – piano
- Mauro Pagani – violin
- Elisabetta Maineri – flute, backing vocals
- Nicole Pellicani – backing vocals
- Silvia Smaniotto – backing vocals

== Charts and sales ==
The album peaked at 4 on the Italian FIMI Singles Chart. As of January 2011, the album went platinum, selling over 60.000 copies.

Chart (2010)	Peak position	Certification	Sales
Italian Albums Chart	4	Platinum	90,000+

== Release history ==
Country	Date	Label
Italy	30 November 2010	Sugar
UK	21 December 2010	Warner
USA	5 January 2011	Warner
