= Caterpillar (Elisa album) =

Greatest hits album by Elisa
- Released: 20 July 2007
- Recorded: 2001–2007
- Length: 61:12
- Language: English; Italian
- Label: Universal Records

Elisa chronology
Soundtrack '96-'06 (2006)	Caterpillar (2007)	Dancing (2008)

Professional ratings
Review scores
Source	Rating
AllMusic	3/5 stars

Caterpillar is a best-of compilation by pop rock singer Elisa, mainly aimed at the international market. It's an international, revisited edition of Soundtrack '96-'06 and it has been published Italy, UK, Germany, Austria, Switzerland, the Netherlands and Luxembourg.

== Track listing ==
All lyrics written by Elisa except where noted; all music composed by Elisa except where noted.

No.	Title	Length
1.	"Stay"	4:11
2.	"Luce (Tramonti a Nord-Est)" (lyrics: Zucchero, Elisa)	4:26
3.	"Gli ostacoli del cuore" (lyrics and music: Ligabue)	4:29
4.	"Broken"	4:19
5.	"Heaven Out of Hell" (music: Elisa, Corrado Rustici)	4:55
6.	"Qualcosa Che Non C'è"	4:37
7.	"Swan" (music: Michele Centonze, Elisa)	4:54
8.	"Eppure sentire (Un senso di te)" (Remix) (music: Paolo Buonvino)	3:38
9.	"Electricity"	4:32
10.	"Rainbow"	4:58
11.	"Rock Your Soul"	5:05
12.	"The Waves"	4:20
13.	"Wild Horses" (lyrics and music: Mick Jagger, Keith Richards)	5:40
14.	"Dancing" (only Australia & New Zealand)	5:36

== Personnel ==
- Fausto Anzelmo – Viola
- Glen Ballard – producer
- Jay Blakesberg – Photography
- Massimo Bonano – vocals (background)
- Paolo Buonvino – piano, arranger, producer, String Director, String Writing
- Scott Campbell – engineer
- Matt Chamberlain – drums
- Andrew Duckles – Viola
- Donald Ferrone – bass
- Andrea Fontana – arranger, drums
- David Frazer – engineer, mixing
- Max Gelsi – bass, arranger, bass (Electric)
- Maurice Grants – Celli
- Paula Hochhalter – Celli
- Suzie Katayama – String Arrangements, String Conductor
- Randy Kerber – piano
- Billy Konkel – Assistant
- William Malina – engineer
- Frank Gayer Martin – Conductor, Orchestration, Transcription
- Kevin Mills – assistant engineer
- Pasquale Minieri – producer
- Lance Morrison – bass
- Enrique Gonzalez Müller – Assistant
- Giorgio Pacorig – piano
- Fabrizio Palma – Choir Conductor
- Rocco Petruzzi – arranger, producer
- Tim Pierce – guitar
- Luca Pincini – Cello
- Michele Richards – Violin
- Benny Rietveld – bass
- Devon Rietveld – engineer, mixing
- Christian Rigano – arranger
- Corrado Rustici – Flute, Guitar, Arranger, Guitar (Electric), Keyboards, Organ (Hammond), Programming, Guitar (12 String), Producer, E-Bow, String Arrangements, Treatments
- Turtle Island String Quartet – Strings
- Michael Urbano – drums
- Mark Valentine – assistant engineer
- Josephina Vergara – Violin

== Chart performance ==
Chart (2007)	Peak position
Italian Album Chart	34
