= Heart (Elisa album) =

Studio album by Elisa
- Released: 13 November 2009
- Recorded: 2009
- Genre: Rock
- Length: 48:43
- Language: English; Italian
- Label: Sugar
- Producer: Elisa; Andrea Rigonat

Elisa chronology
Dancing (2008)	Heart (2009)	Ivy (2010)

Singles from Heart
- 1. "Ti Vorrei Sollevare" Released: 16 October 2009; 2. "Anche se non trovi le parole" Released: 19 January 2010; 3. "Someone to Love" Released: 2 June 2010

Heart is the sixth studio album from Italian singer–songwriter Elisa. It was released on 13 November 2009 in Italy. It has been described as a rock album, with alternative rock and electronic influences.

First studio album since Pearl Days (2004), Heart peaked at number one of the Italian Albums Chart, becoming her second number one album on the chart. The project was promoted by the collaboration "Ti vorrei sollevare" with Giuliano Sangiorgi, which peaked at number one on the Italian Singles Chart.

== Background ==
After fifth studio album Pearl Days (2004), in 2006 Elisa published the greatest hits album Soundtrack '96–'06. which become a commercial success in Italy, becoming the singer's first number one project and being certified diamond. The album was also published in international version Caterpillar and live version Soundtrack '96-'06 Live. In 2008, after the quiet success of the song "Dancing" in United States, Canada and United Kingdom, Sugar Music published the compilation album Dancing, as an international release, which sold over 100,000 copies in US.

Between 2008 and 2009 Elisa announced she would be in the studio for her new record project, stating that it would be in the Italian language. In May 2009 Elisa announced her pregnancy; her first daughter, Emma Cecile was born on 23 October 2009, a month before Elisa new album.

== Composition and recording ==
The composition of the album started in January 2009, with more than 60 sample tracks including melodies, ideas and songs, written and composed since 1998. At a press conference, Elisa explained that she wanted to produce the entire album with only the collaboration of her partner Andrea Rigonat:

"Involving a producer to select the material is something you don't usually do, and something I couldn't afford anyway. Initially we needed to find a direction, to shape it. Once this first part was done, 50% of the work was already done, and calling a producer at this point would have been too easy. I also wanted to take credit for it."

— Elisa on Heart production

The album has fourteen tracks, of which two in Italian and a cover of the song "Mad World". Elisa explained the writing process and the decision to recorded more songs in English than in Italian:

"I got stuck in the lyrics [in Italian]. I couldn't get going, and meanwhile, the work on the CD was so smooth and exciting. So I didn't go ahead with the lyrics and put them in as they came to me: a little bit in Italian and a little bit in English. [...] It is not a concept album because it was not thought of in a global way: there are the songs that I liked best, period; [...] I chose the songs instinctively, I put rationality aside"

— Elisa about the language of the songs

== Critical response ==
Professional ratings
Review scores
Source	Rating
AllMusic	3.5/5 stars
Rolling Stone	4/5 stars
Full Song	9/10 stars
LoudVision	7/10 stars

Heart received generally positive reviews from music critics, Rolling Stone's Emilio Cozzi gave Heart 4 out of 5 stars and commended Elisa: "It seems that Elisa's style has reached a balance between her instinctive expression and a lot of influences".

== Commercial performance ==
The album became Elisa's first number-one studio album on the Italian FIMI Singles Chart, selling 50,000 copies in its first week. The Album also peaked at number 34 on the Global Albums Chart. "Heart" has sold 230,000 copies only in Italy where the album is 3× platinum.

== Track listing ==
All lyrics written by Elisa except where noted; all music composed by Elisa except where noted.

Standard edition / Deluxe edition
No.	Title	Length
1.	"Vortexes" (music: Elisa, Andrea Rigonat)	3:36
2.	"And All I Need"	4:57
3.	"Anche se non trovi le parole" (music: Elisa, Rigonat)	4:04
4.	"This Knot" (music: Elisa, Rigonat)	3:22
5.	"Mad World" (Tears for Fears cover) (lyrics and music: Roland Orzabal)	5:15
6.	"Ti Vorrei Sollevare" (feat. Giuliano Sangiorgi)	4:32
7.	"Your Manifesto"	3:18
8.	"The Big Dipper"	4:02
9.	"Someone to Love"	3:32
10.	"Poems by God" (music: Elisa, Rigonat, Gianluca Ballarin, Andrea Fontana)	3:51
11.	"Coincidences" (music: Elisa, Fontana)	4:05
12.	"Lisert" (lyrics: Elisa, Windy Wagner)	6:34
13.	"Forgiveness" (feat. Antony Hegarty)	3:42
14.	"Dot in the Universe" (lyrics: Elisa, Wagner)	4:37

iTunes Pre-order only
No.	Title	Length
15.	"Ti Vorrei Sollevare"	4:32

== Chart performance ==
=== Weekly charts ===
Chart (2009)	Peak position
Italian Albums (FIMI)	1

=== Year-end charts ===
Chart (2009)	Position
Italian Albums (FIMI)	13
Chart (2010)	Position
Italian Albums (FIMI)	31

== Certifications ==
Region	Certification	Certified units/sales
Italy (FIMI)	3× Platinum	210,000^{*}
^{*} Sales figures based on certification alone.

== Release history ==
Country	Date
Italy	13 November 2009
Australia	7 August 2010
Canada	7 August 2010
Denmark	7 August 2010
Finland	7 August 2010
Greece	7 August 2010
Ireland	7 August 2010
Japan	7 August 2010
New Zealand	7 August 2010
Norway	7 August 2010
Portugal	7 August 2010
Spain	7 August 2010
Sweden	7 August 2010
United Kingdom	7 August 2010
United States	7 August 2010
