= Soundtrack '96–'06 =

Soundtrack '96 '06

Greatest hits album by Elisa
- Released: November 4, 2006
- Genre: Pop rock; soft rock
- Length: 76:59
- Language: English; Italian
- Label: Sugar
- Producer: Corrado Rustici

Elisa chronology
Pearl Days (2004)	Soundtrack '96 '06 (2006)	Caterpillar (2007)

Singles from Soundtrack '96-'06
- 1. "Gli ostacoli del cuore" Released: October 19, 2006; 2. "Eppure sentire (Un senso di te)" Released: January 12, 2007; 3. "Stay" Released: April 6, 2007; 4. "Qualcosa che non c'è" Released: November 2, 2007

Professional ratings
Review scores
Source	Rating
AllMusic	4/5 stars

Soundtrack '96–'06 is the first greatest hits compilation album by the Italian singer-songwriter Elisa. The album was certified Diamond in Italy, with sales exceeding 600,000 copies.

The lead single "Gli ostacoli del cuore" with Italian singer Ligabue, was released on October 19, 2006. The song debuted at number-one of the Italian Digital Chart and the Italian Airplay Chart. The second single released was "Eppure sentire (Un senso di te)", featured in the soundtrack Manual of Love 2 by Giovanni Veronesi. "Stay" was released on April 6, 2007, as third single off the album. The last single "Qualcosa Che Non C'è" was released on November 2, 2007. In July 2007 was released Caterpillar, the international version of Soundtrack '96-'06.

Soundtrack '96-'06 was the best selling album in Italy in 2007. It was also the most downloaded album from iTunes Italy in 2007.

== Track listing ==
No.	Title	Lyrics	Music	Length
1.	"Stay"	Elisa Toffoli	Toffoli	4:10
2.	"Gli ostacoli del cuore" (feat. Ligabue)	Luciano Ligabue	Ligabue	4:26
3.	"Broken"	Toffoli	Toffoli	4:20
4.	"Swan"	Toffoli	Toffoli; Michele Centonze	4:13
5.	"Labyrinth"	Toffoli; Catherine Marie Warner	Toffoli	4:57
6.	"Together"	Toffoli	Toffoli	4:21
7.	"Gift"	Toffoli	Toffoli	4:18
8.	"Almeno tu nell'universo"	Bruno Lauzi	Maurizio Fabrizio	4:08
9.	"Heaven Out of Hell"	Toffoli	Toffoli; Corrado Rustici	4:53
10.	"Dancing"	Toffoli	Toffoli	5:33
11.	"Una poesia anche per te"	Toffoli	Toffoli	5:14
12.	"A Feast for Me"	Toffoli; Warner	Toffoli; Rustici	5:11
13.	"Sleeping in Your Hand" (Mark Saunders Remix)	Toffoli; Warner	Toffoli; Rustici	3:43
14.	"Luce (tramonti a nord est)"	Toffoli; Zucchero Fornaciari	Toffoli	4:24
15.	"Rainbow" (Bedroom Rockers Remix)	Toffoli	Toffoli	4:07
16.	"Eppure Sentire (Un Senso Di Te)"	Toffoli	Paolo Buonvino	4:12
17.	"Qualcosa Che Non C'è"	Toffoli	Toffoli	4:39

== DVD ==
1. "Sleeping in Your Hand"
2. "Labyrinth"
3. "A Feast for Me"
4. "Cure Me"
5. "Gift"
6. "Asile’s World"
7. "Luce (Tramonti a Nord Est)"
8. "Heaven Out of Hell"
9. "Rainbow"
10. "Dancing"
11. "Almeno tu nell’universo"
12. "Broken"
13. "Electricity"
14. "Together"
15. "The Waves"
16. "Una poesia anche per te"
17. "Swan"
18. "Teach Me Again"

== Chart performance ==
Chart (2007)	Peak position
Italian Album Chart	1
Swiss Album Chart	58
European Hot 100 Album Chart	23
