= Lotus (Elisa album) =

Studio album by Elisa
- Released: November 14, 2003
- Genre: Acoustic
- Length: 78:20
- Language: English; Italian
- Label: Sugar
- Producer: Elisa; Pasquale Manieri

Elisa chronology
| Elisa (2002) | Lotus (2003) | Pearl Days (2004) |

Singles from Lotus
- 1. "Broken" Released: October 24, 2003

Lotus is the fourth studio album by Italian singer Elisa, released on November 14, 2003 by Sugar Music. Initially intended as a live album, Lotus became a mixed record containing six new songs, seven re-recorded greatest hits from previous albums and three cover songs. The album is predominantly acoustic; following the initial idea.

The album opens with a cover version of Leonard Cohen's song "Hallelujah" from his 1984 album Various Positions. "Sleeping in Your Hand", "Labyrinth" and "The Marriage" are taken from the singer's 1997 debut album Pipes & Flowers, while "Gift" and "Luce (tramonti a nord est)" are from her second album Asile's World, and "Rock Your Soul" and "Stranger" are from her third album Then Comes the Sun. All of them were revisited in acoustic version. Other cover songs include "Femme Fatale" from The Velvet Underground's first album, The Velvet Underground & Nico and "Almeno tu nell'universo" by Italian singer Mia Martini.

== Track listing ==
All lyrics written by Elisa except where noted; all music composed by Elisa except where noted.

| No. | Title | Length |
|---|---|---|
| 1. | "Hallelujah" (lyrics and music: Leonard Cohen) | 7:26 |
| 2. | "Rock Your Soul" | 4:52 |
| 3. | "Broken" | 4:20 |
| 4. | "Femme fatale" (lyrics and music: Lou Reed) | 4:40 |
| 5. | "Sleeping in Your Hand" (lyrics: Elisa, Catherine Marie Warner; music: Elisa, Corrado Rustici) | 5:46 |
| 6. | "Labyrinth" (lyrics: Elisa, Warner) | 4:56 |
| 7. | "Beautiful Night" | 5:37 |
| 8. | "Almeno tu nell'universo" (lyrics: Bruno Lauzi; music: Maurizio Fabrizio) | 4:53 |
| 9. | "Electricity" | 4:10 |
| 10. | "The Marriage" | 4:34 |
| 11. | "Yashal" | 5:28 |
| 12. | "Stranger" | 4:39 |
| 13. | "Luce (tramonti a nord est)" (lyrics: Elisa, Zucchero) | 4:27 |
| 14. | "Gift" | 3:58 |
| 15. | "Interlude" | 3:43 |
| 16. | "A Prayer" | 4:35 |

== Certifications ==
The album was certified four-times platinum in Italy with more than 400,000 copies sold.
