= A modo tuo =

Single by Elisa

from the album L'anima vola
- Released: November 7, 2014
- Genre: Soft rock
- Length: 5:20
- Label: Sugar Music
- Songwriter: Luciano Ligabue
- Producer: Elisa Toffoli

Elisa singles chronology
"Maledetto labirinto" (2014)	"A modo tuo" (2014)	"No Hero" (2016)

Music video
- "A modo tuo" on YouTube

"A modo tuo" is a song recorded by Italian singer Elisa, released on November 7, 2014 as the sixth and final single from her eighth studio album L'anima vola.

The song was written and composed by Italian singer-songwriter Luciano Ligabue. Ligabue recorded a cover version of the song in 2015.

== Composition ==
The song, written and composed by Luciano Ligabue, is a dedication to the singer's daughter Linda. The song marked the second one written by Ligabue and performed by his will by Elisa after "Gli ostacoli del cuore" (2006). Elisa explained the meaning of the song and the relationship between her and Ligabue:

"This song was written entirely by Luciano, dedicated to his daughter Linda, and he wanted to hear it sung by a mother. Luciano is an all-around artist, he is also a writer, which is why I think it comes naturally to him to put himself so much in the shoes of others, he writes for other souls and other voices as if they were his own, and he tells stories and feelings as few others know how to do, not only in Italy. This time it is the deep relationship between mother and daughter. I think this is one of those "spellbinding" pieces because you are moved after the first few lines and can't go on. [...] As a mother you feel it very much, when it describes well the difficult role of the parent raising their children: they would like to protect them all their lives and keep them away from pain and problems, but deep down they know that they will have to let them go their own way one day"

== Music video ==
The video was made available on November 7, 2014, through Elisa's YouTube channel. Edited by director Sara Tirelli, it was filmed in the Cornino Lake natural reserve and the Roman Quarry in Aurisina. The only main characters of the video are Elisa, her husband Andrea Rigonat, and their firstborn daughter Emma Cecile.

== Charts ==
Chart (2014)	Peak position
Italy (FIMI)	18
Italy (EarOne Airplay)	27

== Certifications ==
Region	Certification	Certified units/sales
Italy (FIMI)	2× Platinum	100,000^{‡}
^{‡} Sales+streaming figures based on certification alone.
