= Stay (Elisa song) =

Single by Elisa

from the album Soundtrack '96-'06 / Caterpillar
- Released: 6 April 2007
- Recorded: 2006
- Genre: Pop rock
- Length: 4:00
- Label: Sugar
- Songwriter: Elisa
- Producer: Corrado Rustici

Elisa singles chronology
| "Eppure Sentire (Un Senso Di Te)" (2007) | "Stay" (2007) | "Qualcosa Che Non C'è" (2007) |

"Stay" is a song by Italian singer Elisa, released on April 6, 2007 as the third single from her first greatest hits compilation album Soundtrack '96-'06. The song also served as the lead single from her the international version of the greatest hits album Caterpillar on 9 July 9, 2007.

== Composition ==
The song, written and composed by Elisa with production by Corrado Rustici, focused on the theme of paternal love and the relationship between the singer and father.

In an interview with Grazia after her father's death in 2015, Elisa talked about her parents' divorce and her relationship with her him, which often flowed into the songs in her discography:

"I have managed by now to get over the pain of growing up without a father, since he was living with another family. [...] When there is pain that comes back and is very deep, it takes many years to process it, especially if you do it alone. [...] I didn't have a relationship with my father. I also wrote a lot of songs about that. We didn't know each other very well. I write about emotions, things that have to do with my life and other people's lives, but also with my worldview. To process negative feelings I need time and I rely on the universe. And then dance, the movement of the body, helps me."

— Elisa about her father

== Track listing ==
- CDs version
1. "Stay" - 3:59
2. "Life Goes On" - 5:22
- Maxi CDs version
1. "Stay" - 3:59
2. "Life Goes On" - 5:22
3. "Dancing" - 5:36

== Music video ==
The music video was filmed by Marco Salom and Elisa in March 2007 in California exclusively for the Italian market. In June 2007 it was re-shot by Joe Tunmer in London for the international version of the video.

== Release history ==
| Country | Release date |
|---|---|
| Italy | 6 April 2007 |
| Europe | November 2007 |

== Chart performance ==
| Chart (2007) | Peak position |
|---|---|
| Europe (Billboard) | 40 |
| Italian Singles (FIMI) | 11 |
| Italian Airplay Chart | 1 |
| Turkey Airplay Chart | 5 |
