= Sleeping in Your Hand =

Single by Elisa

from the album Pipes & Flowers
- Released: 1 May 1997
- Recorded: 1996
- Genre: Pop rock
- Length: 4:22
- Label: Sugar
- Songwriters: Elisa Toffoli; Catherine Marie Warner; Corrado Rustici
- Producer: Corrado Rustici

Elisa singles chronology
"Sleeping in Your Hand" (1997)	"Labyrinth" (1997)

"Sleeping in Your Hand" is the debut single by Italian singer Elisa, released on 1 May 1997 as the lead single from her debut studio album Pipes & Flowers.

== The single ==
The single, which charted in the fifth position on the Italian Singles Chart, was released in Italy in May, 1997 and in August in some European countries (in 1998 in Germany). In Europe the single was also released in a promotional physical version. A remixed version was also released in Europe, which differs from the original in both arrangement and duration and was remixed by the English producer Mark Saunders. This version is also featured on the singer's debut studio album Pipes & Flowers. An acoustic version of the song, which was arranged and produced by Elisa herself, was recorded and featured on the album Lotus, released in 2003. The arrangement differs greatly from the original and the remix and showcases Elisa's various talents as a singer, musician, songwriter, producer and arranger. The remixed version of the song was featured on her first greatest hits album Soundtrack '96-'06, which was released in 2006

== The video ==
The music video was directed by Paolo Caredda, who also directed the music video for "Anche se non trovi le parole", and was produced by Katze Productions Ltd.

== Track listing ==
CD Single Italy

1. "Sleeping in Your Hand" – 4:22
2. "Sleeping in Your Hand (Instrumental)" – 4:22

CD Promo Single UK & CD Single (Germany, Netherlands)

1. "Sleeping in Your Hand (Mark Saunders Remix)" – 3:43
2. "Sleeping in Your Hand" – 4:22
3. "Sleeping in Your Hand (Mark Saunders Long Version Remix)" – 3:53

CD Single (Netherlands, Scandinavia)

1. "Sleeping in Your Hand (Mark Saunders Remix)" – 3:43
2. "Sleeping in Your Hand" – 4:22

CD EP Promo (Netherlands, Germany, Denmark)

1. "Tell Me" – 5:06
2. "Mr. Want" – 4:11
3. "Sleeping in Your Hand" – 4:22
4. "The Marriage" – 4:20

== Charts ==
Chart (2008)	Peak position
Italian Singles Chart	5
Dutch Singles Chart	91
