= Almeno tu nell'universo =

1989 single by Mia Martini

Single by Mia Martini

from the album Martini Mia
- B-side: "Spegni la testa"
- Released: 1989
- Recorded: 1989
- Genre: Pop
- Length: 5:05
- Composer: Maurizio Fabrizio
- Lyricist: Bruno Lauzi

Mia Martini singles chronology
| "Spaccami il cuore" (1985) | "Almeno tu nell'universo" (1989) | "La nevicata del '56" (1990) |

"Almeno tu nell'universo" (Italian pronunciation: [alˈmeːno ˈtu nnelluniˈvɛrso]; transl. "At least you in the [whole] universe") is a song written by Bruno Lauzi and Maurizio Fabrizio and recorded by Italian singer Mia Martini, who released it as a single in 1989 and included the track in her self-titled album Martini Mia. Martini performed the song for the first time at the Sanremo Music Festival 1989, where it placed 9th in a field of 24, but received the Critics' Award, which would be named after Martini herself after her death. The song later became a commercial success, being certified platinum by the Federation of the Italian Music Industry, and is now considered a classic of Italian popular music.

Cover versions of "Almeno tu nell'universo" have been recorded by several artists, including Elisa, Mina, Thelma Houston and Marco Mengoni. In 2005, it was voted the best Sanremo Music Festival song of all time by the readers of the Italian newspaper la Repubblica.

== Background ==
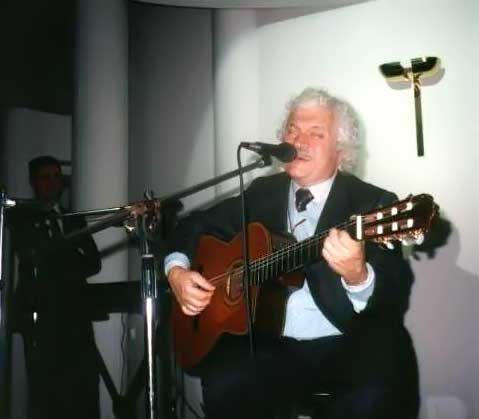
Bruno Lauzi wrote the lyrics of the song.

The music of "Almeno tu nell'universo" was composed in 1974 by Italian songwriter Maurizio Fabrizio. During the same year, Bruno Lauzi was asked to write the lyrics for the song, which he completed in thirty minutes. The authors of the song immediately asked Mia Martini to record the song, but at first she refused it. However, in 1989 Martini decided to record the song for the album Martini Mia, which marked her comeback after several years. The song was also submitted to the artistic committee of the 39th Sanremo Music Festival and, in January 1989, was chosen as one of the 24 entries of the main competition, where it placed ninth, receiving the Critics' Award which would later be entitled to Mia Martini herself.

== Track listing ==
7" single – Fonit Cetra SP 1871
1. "Almeno tu nell'universo" (Bruno Lauzi, Maurizio Fabrizio) – 5:05
2. "Spegni la testa" (Mia Martini) – 4:00

== Charts ==
=== Weekly charts ===
| Chart (1989) | Peak position |
|---|---|
| Italy (Musica e dischi) | 6 |
| Italy Airplay (Music & Media) | 4 |

== Certifications ==
| Region | Certification | Certified units/sales |
|---|---|---|
| Italy (FIMI) | Platinum | 70,000^{‡} |
^{‡} Sales+streaming figures based on certification alone.

== Elisa version ==
"Almeno tu nell'universo"

Single by Elisa

from the album Lotus (acusti version)
- Language: Italian
- Released: 14 February 2003
- Genre: Pop
- Length: 4:07
- Composer: Maurizio Fabrizio
- Lyricist: Bruno Lauzi
- Producers: Michele Centonze; Elisa Toffoli

Elisa singles chronology
| "Time" (2002) | "Almeno tu nell'universo" (2003) | "Broken" (2003) |

Italian singer-songwriter Elisa covered the song as the soundtrack song for Gabriele Muccino's film Remember Me, My Love. An acoustic version of her reinterpretation was recorded for the singer fourth studio album Lotus, released in November of the same year. The original cover song was also included on the singer greatest hits album Soundtrack '96–'06.

=== Music video ===
A music video for the song was directed by Richard Lowenstein and produced by Fandango. It features the singer-songwriter and the stars of the film Remember Me, My Love, singing the song, as well as some scenes from the film. The video premiered on February 14, 2003, during the television program Total Request Live on MTV Italia.

=== Live performances and tributes ===
Elisa paid tribute to Mia Martini by performing her song as a guest during the Sanremo Music Festival 2007 and in a duet with Fiorella Mannoia during the Sanremo Music Festival 2010. Elisa then performed the song in 2009 with Martini's sister Loredana Bertè during the television special concert Amiche in Arena, live recordedfor the album of the same name.

== Cover versions ==
In 1995, Mina decided to include a cover of "Almeno tu nell'universo" in her album Pappa di latte, replacing Domenico Modugno's "Resta cu'mme", which was originally chosen as a track of the album. Mina's cover was the first recorded tribute to Martini, who had died earlier that year.

A cover of the song was recorded by Italian singer Elisa in 2003 for the official soundtrack of the movie Remember Me, My Love, directed by Gabriele Muccino. The song was released as a single, topping the Italian Singles Chart for two non-consecutive weeks and later becoming the sixth best-selling single of the year in Italy.

In 2009 the song was also covered by Italian X Factor contestant and eventual winner Marco Mengoni, who performed it during the 9th live show. Mengoni included a studio recording of the track in his debut extended play, Dove si vola, and a live performance of the song in Re matto live, released in 2010. The studio version of the song peaked at number 22 on the Italian FIMI Singles Chart.

Tiziano Ferro performed the song during the second night of the 70th Sanremo Music Festival, and dedicated his rendition to his husband Victor Allen. Ferro's cover of the song was later recorded and included in the album Accetto miracoli: l'esperienza degli altri, released in November 2020.
