= Gli ostacoli del cuore =

Single by Elisa and Ligabue

from the album Soundtrack '96-'06 and Caterpillar
- Released: October 20, 2006
- Genre: Pop rock
- Length: 4:30
- Label: Sugar
- Songwriter: Luciano Ligabue
- Producer: Corrado Rustici

Elisa singles chronology
"Teach Me Again" (2006)	"Gli ostacoli del cuore" (2006)	"Eppure sentire (Un senso di te)" (2007)

Ligabue singles chronology
"Sono qui per l'amore" (2006)	"Gli ostacoli del cuore" (2006)	"Niente paura" (2007)

"Gli ostacoli del cuore" (en: The Obstacles of Heart) is a song by the Italian singers Elisa and Ligabue, released as single on October 20, 2006. The single is included in Elisa's first greatest hits album Soundtrack '96-'06. Released as the album's lead single, the song was written by Ligabue and produced by Corrado Rustici.

The song also appears on the album Caterpillar, released in September 2007. In the Caterpillar version, the song is sung without Ligabue.

The song debuted at number one on the Italian Singles Chart, spending seven consecutive weeks at number one. It became Elisa's second song to peak at number one in 2006 after "Teach Me Again", as well as the fourth of her career, and Ligabue's eighth.

== Background and composition ==
"Gli ostacoli del cuore" is the first original song featured on an Elisa album of which the artist is the only interpreter. Indeed, the song was written by Luciano Ligabue, with arrangements by Elisa and Corrado Rustici, who also produced the song. During the same recording session the two artists recorded the song "Volente o nolente", published only in 2020. Ligabue told about the meaning of the song and the creative process that led to its creation:

"I was playing guitar, and at one point a melody came out of me that was immediately aligned with a set of words that I felt were particularly feminine in relation to the way I write. I wrote the song in one afternoon and immediately felt like hearing Elisa sing it. I called her, did something I had never done before and kind of groped her to say look, I have a song that I think has to do with you, I would like to let you hear it"

— Ligabue about the writing process

In an interview with TV Sorrisi e Canzoni in 2020, Ligabue said that the collaboration with Elisa was the only one that took place at the artist's direct request during his career:

"I never proposed myself to anyone. The only person I asked was Elisa: I had written The Obstacles of the Heart and I thought she should sing it. The other interpretations of my songs came from managers talking to each other and maybe fancying up the possibility of me giving a piece to someone else."

— Liguabue about his artistic reletionship with Elisa

== Critics reviews ==
"Gli ostacoli del cuore" was received positively by specialized critics, being considered among the best records of the singers' careers.

Panorama placed the song at number one on its list of the "100 Most Beautiful Italian Songs of the 21st Century", making the two singers the only ones to have two songs among the top 10, thanks to Elisa's "Luce (Tramonti a nord est)" at tenth position and Ligabue's "Le donne lo sanno" at eighth one.

== Commercial performance ==
The song debuted at number one of the Italian Singles Chart, becoming Elisa's second song to peak at number one in 2006 after "Teach Me Again", as well as the fourth of her career, and Ligabue eighth. It spent sixth consecutive weeks at number one between November 23, 2006 to January 5, 2007.

The song was the eighth-best-selling song in Italy in 2006. In 2018 it was certified platinum by Federazione Industria Musicale Italiana, counting sales since 2009.

== Music video ==
The "Gli ostacoli del cuore" music video was directed by Ligabue.

== Charts ==
=== Weekly charts ===
Chart (2006)	Peak position
Italy (FIMI)	1

=== Year-end charts ===
Chart (2006)	Position
Italy (FIMI)	8

== Certifications ==
Region	Certification	Certified units/sales
Italy (FIMI) since 2009	Platinum	50,000^{‡}
^{‡} Sales+streaming figures based on certification alone.
