= Pearl Days =

Studio album by Elisa
- Released: October 15, 2004
- Recorded: 2004
- Studio: Los Angeles (Henson Studios)
- Genre: Rock
- Length: 42:03
- Language: English; Italian
- Label: Sugar
- Producer: Glen Ballard

Elisa chronology
| Lotus (2003) | Pearl Days (2004) | Soundtrack '96-'06 (2006) |

Singles from Pearl Days
- 1. "Una poesia anche per te" Released: April 15, 2005

Pearl Days is the fifth studio album by Italian singer Elisa, released on October 15, 2004 by Sugar Music. The album debuted at number two on the Italian album chart. Pearl Days is a rock record, a follow-up to the singer's debut album Pipes & Flowers. The album is certified double platinum in Italy.

The first and only single from the album was "Una poesia anche per te", released on April 15, 2005.

== Background and composition ==
After the publication of her fourth acoustic studio album Lotus, in the spring of 2004 Elisa moved to Los Angeles, California, for seven months, recording and producing her fifth studio album with Glen Ballard at Henson Studios. The artists involved include drummer Matt Chamberlain, keyboardist Benmont Tench, and guitarists Tim Pierce and Michael Landau. In an interview with Rockol, the artist recounted the decision to collaborate with Ballard and the process of producing the rock-sounding album, as well as the choice of collaborators:

"Glen is very soaring, explosive. He's rock but at the same time he has great melodic breath. He's a producer with so much experience, extraordinary as a musician as well. I knew he would really help me. [...] We found each other, that's the important thing. I brought the songs with chords and vocals, then we arranged them together. There were no boundaries, we were each working on each other's ideas. We stimulated each other. I owe Glen a lot for the sound of the record. [...] [The musicians involved] are Glen's collaborators, people he works with often. When I decided to work with him, I didn't want to impose my musicians on him. It was only fair that he surround himself with the people he felt most comfortable with and who gave him the things he needed. They are extraordinary musicians, and I can only be satisfied."

== Critics reception ==
Giulio Nannini of Rockol reports that if in the previous Lotus Elisa "had dedicated herself to the intimate side of her music" in Pearl Days her "rock and more impetuous vein" manifests itself. Nannini finds the production "extremely polished, attentive to the cleanliness of the sound, [...] without ostentation" appreciating the choice not to abandon the English language, stating "she comes to write like this, why distort it?" Among the tracks, the reviewer particularly appreciates Life Goes On, writing that in the arrangement "well-calibrated harmonic openings dominate within an arrangement that combines electric liveliness and a soft string section" and that in general on the album one can appreciate "a wide range of vocal colors and timbres".

== Track listing ==
All lyrics written by Elisa; all music composed by Elisa except where noted.

| No. | Title | Length |
|---|---|---|
| 1. | "Together" | 4:22 |
| 2. | "Bitter Words" | 3:18 |
| 3. | "Pearl Days" | 4:22 |
| 4. | "Joy" (music: Elisa, Glen Ballard) | 3:27 |
| 5. | "Written in Your Eyes" (music: Elisa, Ballard) | 4:08 |
| 6. | "City Lights" | 3:53 |
| 7. | "In the Green" | 4:52 |
| 8. | "I Know" | 4:11 |
| 9. | "The Waves" | 4:10 |
| 10. | "Life Goes On" | 5:15 |

=== Track listing (re-issue) ===
| No. | Title | Length |
|---|---|---|
| 1. | "Together" | 4:22 |
| 2. | "Bitter Words" | 3:18 |
| 3. | "Pearl Days" | 4:22 |
| 4. | "Life Goes On" | 5:15 |
| 5. | "Joy" (music: Elisa, Ballard) | 3:27 |
| 6. | "Written in Your Eyes" (music: Elisa, Ballard) | 4:08 |
| 7. | "City Lights" | 3:53 |
| 8. | "In the Green" | 4:52 |
| 9. | "I Know" | 4:11 |
| 10. | "The Waves" | 4:10 |
| 11. | "Una poesia anche per te" | 5:14 |

== Chart performance ==
=== Weekly charts ===
| Chart (2004) | Peak position |
|---|---|
| Italy (FIMI) | 2 |

=== End-Year charts ===
| Chart (2004) | Peak position |
|---|---|
| Italy (FIMI) | 45 |
