= Teach Me Again =

Single by Tina Turner and Elisa

from the album All the Invisible Children
- Released: January 27, 2006
- Genre: Soul
- Length: 4:33
- Label: Capitol
- Songwriter(s): Elisa, Ali Soleimani Noori
- Producer(s): Elisa

Tina Turner singles chronology
"Complicated Disaster" (2005)	"Teach Me Again" (2006)	"It Would Be A Crime" (2008)

Elisa singles chronology
"Swan" (2005)	"Teach Me Again" (2006)	"Gli ostacoli del cuore" (2006)

"Teach Me Again" is a song recorded by American singer Tina Turner and Italian singer Elisa, released as a single on January 27, 2006. The song was recorded for the film All the Invisible Children. The duet was a number one single in the Italian singles chart and charted in Germany, Switzerland and Austria.

== Track listing and formats ==
European CD maxi single

1. "Teach Me Again" – 4:33
2. "Teach Me Again" (Instrumental) – 4:33
3. "Teach Me Again" (Elisa's Version) – 4:42
4. "Teach Me Again" (Video) – 4:35

== Chart performance ==
=== Weekly charts ===
Chart (2006)	Peak position
Austria (Ö3 Austria Top 40)	65
European Hot 100 Singles (Billboard)	80
Germany (Official German Charts)	43
Italy (FIMI)	1
Switzerland (Schweizer Hitparade)	41
