= Asile's World =

Studio album by Elisa
- Released: May 5, 2000
- Genre: Pop; electronic; trip hop
- Length: 69:06
- Language: English; Italian
- Label: Sugar
- Producer: Howie B; Elisa; Corrado Rustici; Mauro Malavasi; Leo Z; Roberto Vernetti

Elisa chronology
| Pipes & Flowers (1997) | Asile's World (2000) | Then Comes the Sun (2001) |

Singles from Asile's World
- 1. "Gift" Released: March 31, 2000; 2. "Happiness Is Home" Released: July 15, 2000; 3. "Asile's World" Released: November 1, 2000; 4. "Luce (tramonti a nord est)" Released: March 6, 2001

Professional ratings
Review scores
| Source | Rating |
|---|---|
| ARTISTdirect | 4/5 stars |
| AllMusic | 4/5 stars |

Asile's World is the second studio album by Italian singer-songwriter Elisa released on May 5, 2000. Its deluxe version contains the single "Luce (tramonti a nord est)" which served as Elisa's entry and winning at the Sanremo Music Festival 2001.

== Track listing ==
All lyrics are written by Elisa, except where noted.

| No. | Title | Music | Length |
|---|---|---|---|
| 1. | "Gift" | Elisa | 4:18 |
| 2. | "Chameleon" | Elisa | 4:14 |
| 3. | "Happiness Is Home" | Elisa | 4:57 |
| 4. | "Asile's World" | Elisa · Leo Z | 3:50 |
| 5. | "Seven Times" | Elisa | 4:35 |
| 6. | "Upside Down" | Elisa · Leo Z | 4:13 |
| 7. | "A Little Over Zero" | Elisa | 5:01 |
| 8. | "Creature" | Elisa · Leo Z | 4:05 |
| 9. | "Just Some Order" | Elisa · Mauro Malavasi | 3:29 |
| 10. | "Come and Sit" | Elisa | 4:35 |
| 11. | "Happiness is Home" (Elisa's Mix) | Elisa | 4:24 |
| 12. | "Tic Tac" | Elisa · Malavasi | 4:22 |
| 13. | "Little Eye" (includes the ghost track "Asile's World Alternate Version") | Elisa · Malavasi | 9:44 |

Re-issue

| No. | Title | Music | Length |
|---|---|---|---|
| 1. | "Luce (tramonti a nord est)" (lyrics: Elisa, Zucchero) | Elisa | 4:18 |
| 2. | "Gift" | Elisa | 4:18 |
| 3. | "Chameleon" | Elisa | 4:14 |
| 4. | "Happiness Is Home" | Elisa | 4:57 |
| 5. | "Asile's World" | Elisa · Leo Z | 3:50 |
| 6. | "Seven Times" | Elisa | 4:35 |
| 7. | "Upside Down" | Elisa · Leo Z | 4:13 |
| 8. | "A Little Over Zero" | Elisa | 5:01 |
| 9. | "Creature" | Elisa · Leo Z | 4:05 |
| 10. | "Just Some Order" | Elisa · Malavasi | 3:29 |
| 11. | "Come and Sit" | Elisa | 4:35 |
| 12. | "Happiness Is Home" (Elisa's Mix) | Elisa | 4:24 |
| 13. | "Tic Tac" | Elisa · Malavasi | 4:22 |
| 14. | "Little Eye" | Elisa · Malavasi | 4:25 |
| 15. | "Come Speak to Me" | Elisa | 4:25 |
| 16. | "Asile's World" (Bedroom Rockers Remix) | Elisa · Leo Z | 3:40 |

== Personnel ==
- Marc Abraham – acoustic bass
- Howie B – producer
- Antonio Baglio – mastering
- Enrico Colombo – producer, remixing
- Paul Cook – programming
- Elisa – piano, keyboards, programming, vocals, producer
- Andrea Fontana – drums
- Gaudi – theremin, moog
- Michael Gordon – string arrangements
- Paolo Gozzetti – mixing
- Billy Konkel – assistant engineer, mixing assistant
- Leo Z – percussion, piano, electric bass, electric guitar, harp, keyboards, programming, producer, engineer, computers, sampling, djembe, shaker, mixing
- Aidan Love – programming
- Luca Malaguti – programming, engineer, mixing, pre-mastering
- Mauro Malavasi – production supervisor
- Trevor Morais – drums
- Will O'Donovan – engineer, mixing
- Fabio Recupero – mixing assistant
- Benny Rietveld – bass
- Devon Rietveld – bass, engineer, mixing
- Corrado Rustici – guitar, arranger, keyboards, programming, producer, string arrangements
- Soul Boy – backing vocals
- Caterina Caselli Sugar – project support
- Chris Taylor – guitar
- Rudy Trevisi – percussion
- Michael Urbano – drums
- Fred Ventura – producer, remixing

== Commercial performance ==
Asile's World debuted at number seven of the Italian Albums Charts, becoming Elisa's second consecutive album to achieve it on the chart. In 2001, with the re-release of the album Asile's World (Sanremo Edition), the project reached number five in the chart, becoming the 49th best-selling album in Italy of the year.

== Charts ==
=== Weekly charts ===
| Chart (2001) | Peak position |
|---|---|
| Italian Albums (FIMI) | 5 |

=== Year-end charts ===
| Chart (2001) | Position |
|---|---|
| Italy (FIMI) | 49 |

== Certifications ==
| Region | Certification | Certified units/sales |
|---|---|---|
| Italy (FIMI) | Platinum | 150,000 |
