= Life Goes On (Elisa song) =

2004 song by Elisa

Song by Elisa

from the album Pearl Days
- Language: English
- Released: 14 October 2004
- Genre: Soft rock
- Length: 5:15
- Songwriter: Elisa Toffoli
- Producer: Glen Ballard

"Una poesia anche per te"

Single by Elisa

from the album Pearl Days
- Released: 15 April 2005
- Genre: Soft rock
- Length: 5:14
- Songwriter: Elisa Toffoli
- Producer: Glen Ballard

Elisa singles chronology
"The Waves" (2004)	"Una poesia anche per te" (2005)	"Swan" (2005)

"Life Goes On" is a song by Italian singer Elisa, included in her album Pearl Days. The Italian version of the song, "Una poesia anche per te", was released on April 15, 2005 as the only single from her fifth studio album Pearl Days.

== Composition ==
The song was written and composed by Elisa with production by Glen Ballard, in English with the title "Life Goes On", as part of the first edition of Pearl Days in 2004. In the re-release of the album in 2005, the song was translated into Italian with the title "Una poesia anche per te", (later renamed "Una poesia anche per te (Life Goes On)").

The change from the English to the Italian version is not a literal translation of the lyrics, despite the fact that the two songs have the same instrumental base and there is a correspondence of some stanzas; the reason lies in the dedication of the Italian version of the song to the singer's grandfather, as she herself recounted in an interview with La Repubblica:"I made the decision following the death of my grandfather two months ago. An incredible man who managed to walk back from Germany after being imprisoned in a Nazi concentration camps, and who always taught us a lot of things. His was always a message of life, and this is what I wanted to represent."

== Critical reception ==
Reviewing the album, Giulio Nannini of Rockol wrote that in the arrangement "well-calibrated harmonic openings dominate within an arrangement that combines electric liveliness and a soft string section" and that one can appreciate "a wide range of vocal colors and timbres".

== Charts ==
=== Weekly charts ===
Chart (2005)	Peak position
Italy (FIMI)	2

=== End-Year Charts ===
Chart (2005)	Peak position
Italy (FIMI)	5

== Sales ==
"Una poesia anche per te" sold 21,000 copies in Italy in 2005.

== Track listing ==
1. Una poesia anche per te (Life goes on) - 5:14 - (E. Toffoli)
2. The Waves - 4:10 - (E. Toffoli)
