= Broken (Elisa song) =

Single by Elisa

from the album Lotus
- Released: October 24, 2003
- Recorded: 2003 at Officine Meccaniche (Milan)
- Genre: Acoustic rock; folk rock
- Length: 4:20
- Label: Sugar
- Songwriter: Elisa
- Producers: Elisa, Pasquale Minieri

Elisa singles chronology
"Almeno tu nell'universo" (2003)	"Broken" (2003)	"Electricity" (2004)

"Broken" is a song by Italian singer Elisa, released on October 24, 2003, as the lead single from her fourth studio album Lotus. The song was also includes in the greatest hits album Soundtrack '96–'06.

== Music video ==
The music video for the song was filmed in October 2003 by Luca Guadagnino.

== Track listings ==
CD-EP

1. "Broken" – 4:20
2. "(Sittin' on) the Dock of the Bay" – 2:52
3. "Redemption Song" – 5:23

== Chart performance ==
Chart (2003)	Peak position
Italian Singles Chart	3
