= Qualcosa che non c'è =

Single by Elisa

from the album Soundtrack '96-'06
- Released: November 2, 2007
- Recorded: 2006
- Genre: Alternative rock
- Length: 4:40
- Label: Sugar
- Songwriter: Elisa
- Producer: Corrado Rustici

Elisa singles chronology
"Stay" (2007)	"Qualcosa che non c'è" (2007)	"Ti Vorrei Sollevare" (2009)

"Qualcosa che non c'è" is a song by Italian singer Elisa, released on November 2, 2007 as the fourth and final single from the greatest hits compilation album Soundtrack '96-'06.

An introspective, intimate, and deeply autobiographical song, the promo aired on the radio from November 2, 2007 exclusively in Italy.

== Chart performance ==
Chart (2008)	Peak position
Italian Singles Chart	17
