= Eppure sentire (Un senso di te) =

Single by Elisa

from the album Soundtrack '96-'06
- Released: 12 January 2007
- Genre: Pop
- Label: Sugar
- Songwriters: Elisa, Paolo Buonvino
- Producer: Corrado Rustici

Elisa singles chronology
"Gli ostacoli del cuore" (2006)	"Eppure sentire (Un senso di te)" (2007)	"Stay" (2007)

"Eppure sentire (Un senso di te)" is a song by Italian singer Elisa, released on January 12, 2007 as the second single from her first greatest hits compilation Soundtrack '96-'06.

The song is part of the soundtrack supervised by Paolo Buonvino for the film Manual of Love 2, directed by Giovanni Veronesi. The song was nominated for the David di Donatello for Best Original Song, marking the artist's first nomination.

== Versions of the song ==
- Eppure sentire (un senso di te) (Album edit)
- Eppure sentire (un senso di te) (Radio edit)
- Eppure sentire (un senso di te) (Unplugged version)
- One Step Away
- Sentir sin embargo

== Chart performance ==
Chart (2007)	Peak position
Italy (FIMI)	2

== Certifications ==
Region	Certification	Certified units/sales
Italy (FIMI) since 2009	Platinum	50,000^{‡}
^{‡} Sales+streaming figures based on certification alone.
