= Then Comes the Sun =

Studio album by Elisa
- Released: 9 November 2001
- Recorded: 2001
- Studio: The Plant Studios (Sausalito)
- Length: 57:39
- Language: English
- Label: Sugar
- Producer: Corrado Rustici

Elisa chronology
Asile's World (2000)	Then Comes the Sun (2001)	Elisa (2002)

Singles from Then Comes the Sun
- 1. "Rainbow" Released: February 22, 2002; 2. "Time" Released: July 22, 2002

Then Comes the Sun is the third studio album by Italian singer-songwriter Elisa released on November 9, 2001 by Sugar. It was produced by Corrado Rustici and was certified double platinum in Italy with over 280.000 copies sold.

The lead single released from the album was "Rainbow", which debuted at number 5 in the Italian Singles Chart. The second and final single released was "Time". Two promotional singles were released to promote the record: "Heaven Out of Hell" and "Dancing".

In 2007 Then Comes the Sun was appreciated in the United States and Canada after the song "Dancing" was used in the choreography from So You Think You Can Dance.

== Track listing ==
All lyrics are written by Elisa; all music is composed by Elisa, except where noted.

No.	Title	Length
1.	"Rainbow"	5:00
2.	"Heaven Out of Hell" (music: Elisa, Corrado Rustici)	4:55
3.	"Dancing"	5:35
4.	"Fever" (music: Elisa, Rustici)	4:20
5.	"Stranger"	3:55
6.	"A Little Over Zero" (music: Elisa, Rustici)	5:30
7.	"Time"	3:55
8.	"Fairy Girl"	5:00
9.	"The Window"	1:40
10.	"Rock Your Soul"	5:01
11.	"It Is What It Is"	3:50
12.	"Simplicity" (contains the hidden track "Rainbow Bells")	8:30

== Chart performance ==
=== Weekly charts ===
Chart (2001–02)	Peak position
Italian Albums (FIMI)	10

=== Year-end charts ===
Chart (2001)	Position
Italian Albums (Musica e Dischi)	99

Chart (2002)	Position
Italian Albums (FIMI)	28
