= Corrado Rustici =

Italian musician

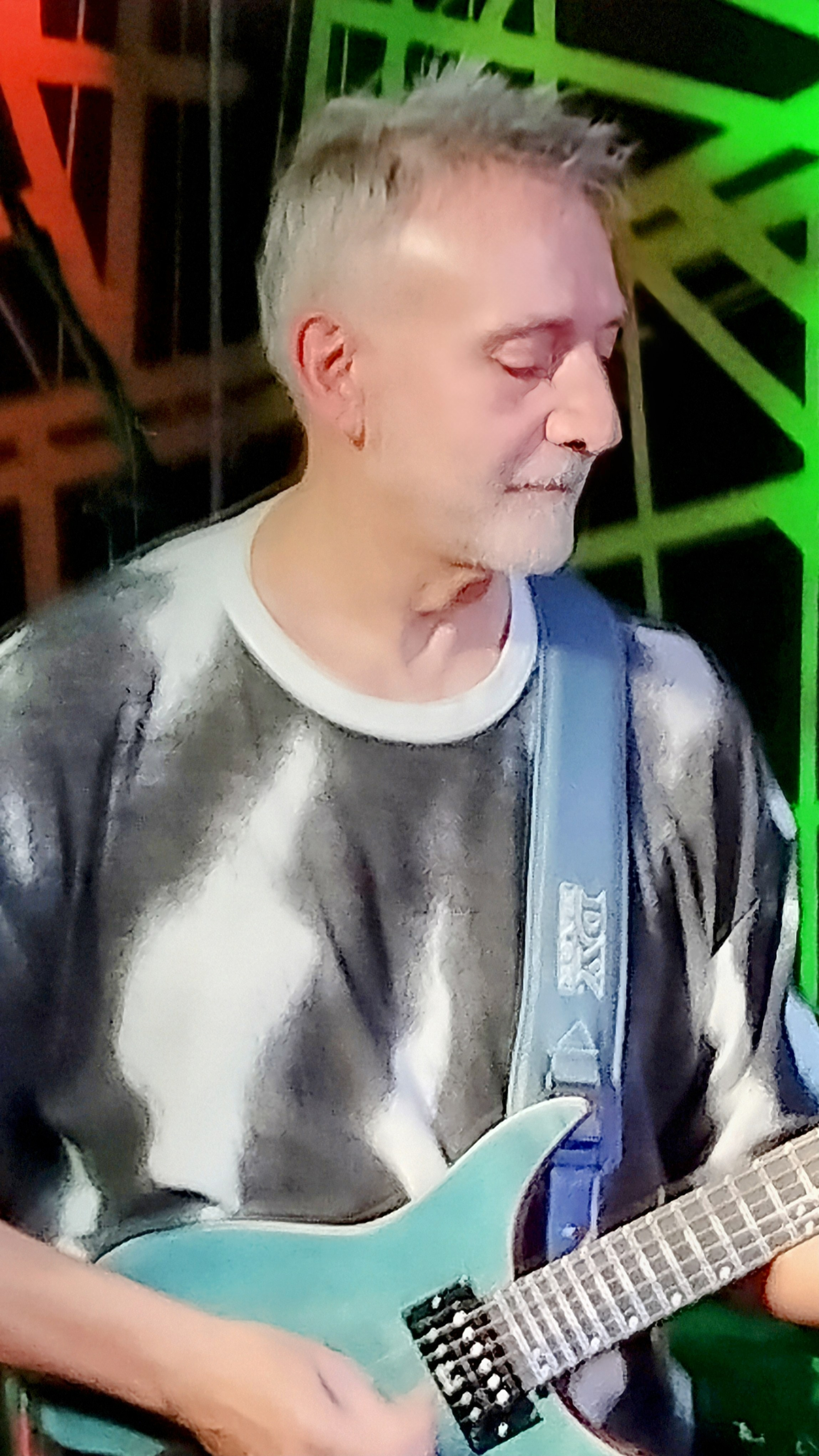

Background information
- Born: 1957 (age 68–69); Naples, Italy
- Genres: Jazz rock, progressive rock, pop rock
- Occupations: Musician, composer, producer
- Instruments: Guitar, keyboards, vocals
- Years active: 1971-present
- Label: Sugar Music
- Website: www.corradorustici.com

Corrado Rustici (born 1957) is an Italian musician, songwriter and producer.

== Recording career ==
Rustici was a founder member of the Naples-based progressive rock group Cervello. The band recorded the album Melos in 1973, with Rustici on guitar and vocals. In 1975, he joined with members of Osanna, including his brother Danilo, to form the group Nova. In 1976, they recorded the album Blink. For the next two albums Vimana (1976) and Wings of Love (1977), they relocated to London and worked with prominent members of the progressive rock and jazz fusion scenes, including Narada Michael Walden and Phil Collins. Nova's final album, Sun City (1978) was recorded in New York. After the disbandment of Nova, Rustici moved to Los Angeles and started a successful career as a producer and musician collaborating with many artists both in the United States and Italy. These have included Whitney Houston, Aretha Franklin, Zucchero and Elisa.

In 1995, Rustici released his first solo album, The Heartist. His 2006 album, Deconstruction of a Postmodern Musician, features guest artists such as Elisa and Allan Holdsworth. To promote the album Rustici formed the Corrado Rustici Trio with former Jethro Tull keyboardist Peter-John Vettese and jazz fusion drummer Steve Smith. In 2014, the band recorded a live album Blaze and Bloom - Live in Japan. In 2017, Rustici performed at a reunion concert in Tokyo with other original members of Cervello, later to be released as a live CD and DVD titled Cervello - Live in Tokyo 2017. In 2021, Rustici released the album Interfulgent and a single called "The Singing Light" in memory of his brother Danilo.

== Discography ==
=== Solo albums ===
- 1995: The Heartist
- 2006: Deconstruction of a Postmodern Musician
- 2014: Blaze and Bloom - Live in Japan
- 2016: Aham
- 2021: Interfulgent

=== With Cervello ===
- 1973: Melos
- 2019: Cervello - Live in Tokyo 2017

=== With Nova ===
- 1975: Blink
- 1976: Vimana
- 1977: Wings of Love
- 1978: Sun City

=== With other artists ===
Claudio Baglioni

- 1999: Viaggiatore sulla coda del tempo

John G. Perry

- 1976: Sunset Wading
- 1977: Seabird

Narada Michael Walden

- 1979: The Dance of Life
- 1980: Victory
- 1982: Confidence
- 1983: Looking at You, Looking at Me
- 1985: The Nature of Things
- 1988: Divine Emotion

Herbie Hancock

- 1982: Lite Me Up

Whitney Houston

- 1985: Whitney Houston
- 1987: Whitney

Aretha Franklin

- 1985: Who's Zoomin' Who?
- 1986: Aretha

George Benson

- 1986: While the City Sleeps...

Larry Graham

- 1985: Fired Up

Enzo Avitabile

- 1991: Enzo Avitabile

Sister Sledge

- 1981: All American Girls

Elton John

- 1994: True Love

Jefferson Starship

- 1987: No Protection

Al Jarreau

- 1992: Heaven and Earth

Dionne Warwick

- 1985: Friends

Clarence Clemons

- 1985: Hero

Zucchero Fornaciari

- 1985: Zucchero & The Randy Jackson Band
- 1986: Rispetto
- 1987: Blue's
- 1989: Oro Incenso & Birra
- 1992: Miserere
- 1995: Spirito DiVino
- 1998: BlueSugar
- 2001: Shake

I Muvrini

- 1998: Leia

Francesco De Gregori

- 1996: Prendere e lasciare

Elisa

- 1997: Pipes & Flowers
- 2001: Luce (tramonti a nord est)
- 2001: Then Comes the Sun
- 2006: Soundtrack '96-'06
- 2007: Caterpillar

Andrea Bocelli

- 2004: Andrea

Negramaro

- 2004: Negramaro
- 2005: Mentre tutto scorre
- 2007: La finestra

Ameba4

- 2006: ameba4

Romeus

- 2010: Romeus

Luciano Ligabue

- 2007: Niente paura
- 2007: Buonanotte all'Italia
- 2008: Il centro del mondo
- 2010: Arrivederci, mostro!
- 2011: Campovolo 2.011

Giusy Ferreri

- 2011: Il mare immenso
- 2011: Deja vù

Noemi

- 2011: RossoNoemi
- 2011: Odio tutti i cantanti
- 2011: Poi inventi il modo
- 2012: Sono solo parole
- 2012: In un giorno qualunque

Cristiano De André

- 2013: Come in cielo così in guerra

Tazenda

- 1995: Fortza Paris

Pino Daniele

- 2013: Resta quel che resta

Rita

- 2000: Time For Peace
