= Dancing (Elisa song) =

Promotional single by Elisa

from the album Then Comes the Sun
- Released: September 20, 2002 (Italy); December 2007 (United States)
- Genre: Pop soul
- Length: 5:36
- Label: Sugar
- Songwriter: Elisa

Elisa singles chronology
"Time" (2002)	"Dancing" (2002)	"Almeno tu nell'universo" (2003)

Elisa US singles chronology
"Dancing" (2007)	"Rainbow" (2008)

"Dancing" is a song by Italian singer Elisa, released on September 20, 2002 as a promotional single from her third studio album Then Comes the Sun. Upon the release of her compilation album Dancing, the song was officially released as a single on December 2007 in United States and Canada.

The song was part of the soundtrack of Casomai (2002) directed by Alessandro D'Alatri, alongside Heaven Out of Hell, both being nominated Nastro d'Argento for Best Original Song.

== Composition ==
The song, written and composed by Elisa herself, was written after the singer dance with the person described in the lyrics. In an interview with Enrico Silvestrin in 2014, the singer-songwriter stated that "Dancing" was influenced by her listening to Jeff Buckley.

== Release and commercial success in North America ==
The song was released as a promotional single from her third studio album Then Comes the Sun for Italian radio airplay. After the song was performed on the second and third season of United States' televisison show So You Think You Can Dance between 2006 and 2007, the song was sold over 80 000 copies on ITunes in the United States. Elisa's record label Sugar Music release a compilation album with the same name of the song, which was released as the official lead single.

== Track listings ==
- US EP
1. "Dancing" – 5:36
2. "Dancing" (live from London iTunes Festival) – 5:36
3. "Rock Your Soul" – 5:03

== Use in the media ==
- In 2006, the song was used as the solo music for Jessica Fernandez on the hit show So You Think You Can Dance when she placed in the bottom three.
- In 2007, it was again used in So You Think You Can Dance, first by Jaimie Goodwin as her audition song in New York and second on the Top 20 show danced to by Lacey Schwimmer and Kameron Bink and choreographed by Mia Michaels, both in the third season.
- In 2008, Kelli Baker used it as her audition song in Utah for the fourth season of So You Think You Can Dance.
- In the 2012 dance film Step Up Revolution, a scene includes the protagonist Emily (Kathryn McCormick) dancing to this song to audition for a contemporary dance company headed by Olivia Brown (Mia Michaels).

== Chart performance ==
Chart (2008–2012)	Peak position
Canadian Digital Singles	54
Italy (FIMI)	33
US Billboard Hot Singles Recurrents	25
