= Rainbow (Elisa song) =

Single by Elisa

from the album Then Comes the Sun
- Released: 28 February 2002 (Italy) 14 July 2008 (US radio)
- Genre: Alternative rock
- Length: 5:01
- Label: Universal Records; Sugar
- Songwriter(s): Elisa
- Producer(s): Glen Ballard

"Rainbow" is a song by Italian singer Elisa, released on 28 February 2002 as the lead single from her third studio album Then Comes the Sun and the first single released from the American compilation Dancing, published in 2008.

The song was also featured in Luca Guadagnino's 2005 film Melissa P..

== Music video ==
The American music video of Rainbow was filmed in July 2008 with the participation of Lacey Schwimmer from So You Think You Can Dance.

== Track listing ==
Standard edition

1. "Rainbow" (Bedroom Rockers Remix)
2. "Rainbow" (Radio edit)
3. "Heaven Out Of Hell" (Sensual Heaven remix)
4. "Heaven Out Of Hell" (Live at Tropical Pizza 14/11/01)

US edition

1. "Rainbow" (Glen Ballard remix)
2. "Rainbow" (Album Version)

== Chart performance ==
Chart (2002)	Peak position
Italy (FIMI)	5
