= Pipes & Flowers =

Studio album by Elisa
- Released: September 22, 1997
- Studio: Fantasy Studios and Rocky Road Studios (Berkeley, California)
- Genre: Rock
- Length: 50:30
- Language: English
- Label: Sugar
- Producer: Corrado Rustici; Darren Allison

Elisa chronology
Pipes & Flowers (1997)	Asile's World (2000)

Singles from Pipes & Flowers
- 1. "Sleeping in Your Hand" Released: May 3, 1997; 2. "Labyrinth" Released: November 20, 1997; 3. "Mr. Want" Released: May 14, 1998; 4. "Cure Me" Released: October 18, 1998

Professional ratings
Review scores
Source	Rating
AllMusic	3/5 stars

Pipes & Flowers is the debut studio album by Italian singer-songwriter Elisa, released on Septembre 22, 1997 by Sugar Records. The album was anticipated by its lead single "Sleeping in Your Hand". In 1998 the album was re-released with the bonus track "Cure Me".

== Track listing ==
Pipes & Flowers – Standard track listing
No.	Title	Lyrics	Music	Length
1.	"Labyrinth"	Elisa Toffoli; Catherine Marie Warner	Toffoli	4:56
2.	"Mr. Want"	Toffoli; Warner	Toffoli; Corrado Rustici	4:11
3.	"Sleeping in Your Hand"	Toffoli; Warner	Toffoli; Rustici	4:22
4.	"Shadow Zone"	Toffoli; Warner	Toffoli	4:14
5.	"A Feast for Me"	Toffoli; Warner	Toffoli; Rustici	5:12
6.	"So Delicate So Pure"	Toffoli; Brent Fraser	Toffoli	3:42
7.	"New Kiss"	Toffoli; Warner	Toffoli	5:01
8.	"Tell Me"	Toffoli; Fraser	Toffoli	5:06
9.	"The Marriage"	Toffoli	Toffoli	4:21
10.	"Inside a Flower"	Toffoli; Fraser	Toffoli; Rustici	5:24
11.	"Sleeping in Your Hand" (Mark Saunders Remix)	Toffoli; Warner	Toffoli; Rustici	3:44

Pipes & Flowers – 1998 re-release bonus track
No.	Title	Lyrics	Music	Length
12.	"Cure Me"	Toffoli	Toffoli; Andrea Rigonat; Andrea Fontana; Max Gelsi; Christian Rigano; Carlo Bonazza	3:30

== Personnel ==
- Steve Smith - drums
- Benny Rietveld - bass
- Corrado Rustici - guitar, keyboards
- Polo Jones - bass on 6,10
- Frank Martin - Hammond organ on 7, piano on 9
- Louis Biancaniello - piano on 10
- Claytoven Richardson, Conesha Owens, Kitty Beethoven, Sandy Griffith - backing vocals on 10

Technical

- Tracks 1–11: Corrado Rustici - producer, Matt Rohr - mixing
- Track 12: Darren Allison - producer, mixing
- Brian Lane: mastering

== Charts ==
Weekly charts

Chart (1998)	Peak position
Italian Albums (FIMI)	9

Year-end charts

Chart (1998)	Position
Italian Albums (FIMI)	25

== Certifications ==
Region	Certification	Certified units/sales
Italy (FIMI)	3× Platinum	300,000^{*}
^{*} Sales figures based on certification alone.
