= Luce (Tramonti a nord est) =

2001 single by Elisa

Single by Elisa

from the album Asile's World
- Released: March 6, 2001
- Genre: Trip hop; pop rock
- Length: 4:24
- Label: Sugar
- Songwriters: Elisa Toffoli; Zucchero Fornaciari
- Producer: Corrado Rustici

Elisa singles chronology
"Asile's World" (2002)	"Luce (Tramonti a nord est)" (2001)	"Heaven out of Hell" (2003)

"Luce (Italian: [ˈluːtʃe]) (Tramonti a nord est)" (translating to 'Light (Sunsets in the North-East)') is a song co-written and recorded by Italian singer Elisa released on March 6, 2001 as the fourth and final single from her second studio album Asile's World. The English version of the song, "Come Speak to Me" was released in 2002.

The song won the annual Sanremo Music Festival, being awarded with six awards, including the "Mia Martini Critics' Award" and the "Songwriter Award". The song is considered a classic of Italian music culture of the new millennium by Italian music critics and one of the best song in Sanremo Festival's history, being included in numerous publications and lists, including Rolling Stone Italia, TV Sorrisi e Canzoni, Rockol, and Panorama.

The song became the singer's first number one in the Italian singles chart, also debuting Swiss, Belgian and Dutch charts.

== Background and composition ==
The song, originally composed in the spring of 2000, was written by Elisa in English under the title "Come Speak to Me". The singer-songwriter later translated the lyrics into Italian with Zucchero Fornaciari's help, who wrote part of the refrain, namely the aside: 'Siamo nella stessa lacrima' (We are in the same tear), to participate in the 2001 edition of the Sanremo Music Festival, becoming the first song published in Italian by Elisa in her career. It is heavily influenced by Björk, with references to Peter Gabriel during the chorus bassline. In a later interview with Rockol, Elisa told of her meeting with Zucchero and the meaning of the song:

I clearly remember meeting Zucchero, who wrote the verse 'Siamo nella stessa lacrima' (We are in the same tear), which was absolutely his own idea and a sentence that I would never have written. [...] Visiting his house was like entering a film, with plants everywhere and peacocks. His studio then looked like a hobbit house, he had a low table, an upright piano, papers everywhere with written words, it was like entering a laboratory. He was extremely humble, he didn't look like Sugar, he was more of a scholar. [...] "Luce" for me was a magical piece, it was one of the most important songs I had written, it marked a strong change in my writing. What I had done before was very metaphorical, I didn't speak so directly about my own things, it was a song of great emotional commitment and in addition to writing it in English, I had tried, and succeeded, to open a window to sing it in Italian as well. It tells of the end of a love story, it was really liberating to say it in my own language too, so the message would have reached the person the song was addressed to.

== Promotion and Sanremo ==
The two versions of the song, in English and Italian, were included in the new edition of the album Asile's World after her participation at the Festival. The English version, "Come Speak to Me", was also published in most of Europe and other states of the world between 2002 and 2003; in particular, in Spain it was published with the lyrics translated into Spanish and entitled "Háblame (Parlami").

In an interview to celebrate the twentieth anniversary of the publication of Luce given to Rolling Stone Italia, Elisa explained the creative process put in place at Sanremo to perform the song:

I was 23 years old, I had made two albums in English and it was my first time in Italian, and the song I had written was about a story I had lived through. My father was in a coma for a stroke during that week at Sanremo and I did not know if I would see him again when I returned, our relationship had always been controversial and unresolved, but his condition touched me deeply. [...] I had designed the clothes I wore on stage, all white all the time, because it was the colour of mourning in Chinese culture, which I was studying a lot at the time, and it represented for me the end of the love story I was talking about in the song. Those days were a test of balance for me, I could rely on my own strength, but I was used to doing it and I did it. [...] I returned home with the knowledge that I had experienced something great and unrepeatable, that's also why I never returned to the competition but only as a guest. Music is not a competition, but tension and pressure can sometimes push you to give your best

== Critics reception ==
"Luce (tramonti a nord est)" received favourable revisions by italian music critics, being considered one of the best Elisa's career song and a classic of Italian music of the new millennium. TV Sorrisi e Canzoni included the song in its list of the "Best Italian Pop Songs of the 2000s". Panorama ranked the song 10th on its list of the "100 Greatest Italian Songs of the Twenty-first Century", while Rolling Stone Italia ranked the song 18th among the "20 Greatest Italian Songs of the Millennium".

Franco Zanetti of Rockol, reviewing the song, reports that "Elisa was indeed an impressive novelty for Italian pop", since with "Luce (tramonti a nord est)" 'she brings a wind of novelty: she translates into accessible sounds some of the stylistic features of atmospheric and livid electropop, [...] with the merit of not sacrificing anything in terms of melody and emotionality', through 'a highly suggestive acoustic cloud'. Zanetti also writes that the lyrics adopt 'a triumph of naturalism that filters the fragile condition of a relationship that has broken off communication', associating them with the songs of Mogol and Zucchero, concluding that 'the hypnotic repetition of "ascoltami" in the finale, in which the voice seems to enchant itself, [. ...] until it resonates with the air and with the echoes of the landscape, to close on a sudden and dazzling change, [...] which speaks of consciences to be questioned, perspectives to be overturned and voices to be no longer covered". The song was also appreciated by listeners, being chosen as the best song of the 2000s by the readers of Rockol.

The song is critically considered to be one of the best in the history of the Sanremo Festival; italian music website Ondarock placed "Luce (tramonti a nord est)" in 18th position on its overall list "Best Sanremo Songs". Panorama ranked the song in 1st position of "The 30 Most Beautiful Songs of the Festival Ever".

== Accolades ==
Ceremony	Year	Category	Result	Ref.
Italian Music Awards	2001	Best Italian Single	Won	
Italian Music Awards	2001	Best Music Composition	Won	
Italian Music Awards	2001	Best Italian Videoclip	Nominated	
Premio Italiano della Musica	2002	Song of the Year	Won	
Sanremo Music Festival	2001	Sanremo Music Festival - Champions Section	Won	
Sanremo Music Festival	2001	Mia Martini Critics' Prize	Won	
Sanremo Music Festival	2001	Radio and TV Critics' Prize	Won	
Sanremo Music Festival	2001	Best Performance	Won	
Sanremo Music Festival	2001	Songwriter Award	Won	

== Track list ==
1. "Luce (tramonti a nord est)" (E. Toffoli, A. Fornaciari) (4:24)
2. "Come speak to me" (E. Toffoli) (4:23)
3. "Asile's world" [Bedroom Rockers remix] (E. Toffoli, L. Bafunno) (3:39)

== Commercial performance ==
Within a month of its release, "Luce (tramonti a nord est)" sold 30 000 copies in Italy, remaining at the top of the Italian singles chart for four consecutive weeks. It was frequently played on the radio, reaching the number 1 position in the Italian Airplay Charts. In 2018, 17 years after its release, it earned a second gold disc for the more than 25 000 copies sold, counted by Federazione Industria Musicale Italiana since 2009.

== Chart performance ==
Chart (2001)	Peak position
Belgium (Ultratip Bubbling Under Flanders)	8
Belgium (Ultratip Bubbling Under Wallonia)	12
Italy (FIMI)	1
Netherlands (Single Top 100)	91
Switzerland (Schweizer Hitparade)	70

== Certifications ==
Region	Certification	Certified units/sales
Italy Digital, CD, EP	—	30,000 (Note: The first version of "Luce (tramonti a nord est)" was published before official certifications FIMI, established in 2009. Sales were published through the magazine and newspaper without a certification level.)
Italy (FIMI) Sales since 2009	Platinum	100,000^{‡}
^{‡} Sales+streaming figures based on certification alone.

== Cover versions ==
Raphael Gualazzi performed a cover of the song during the "Sanremo Story" round of the Sanremo Music Festival 2013. His cover was included as a bonus track on the international deluxe edition of the album Happy Mistake.

Michele Zarrillo recorded the song for the album Vivere e rinascere – Passioni in 2014.

The song was performed by Italian rapper Rancore and La Rappresentante di Lista during the covers' night at the Sanremo Music Festival 2020. It was released as a single on 7 February 2020.
