= Elisa (Italian singer) =

Italian singer-songwriter (born 1977)

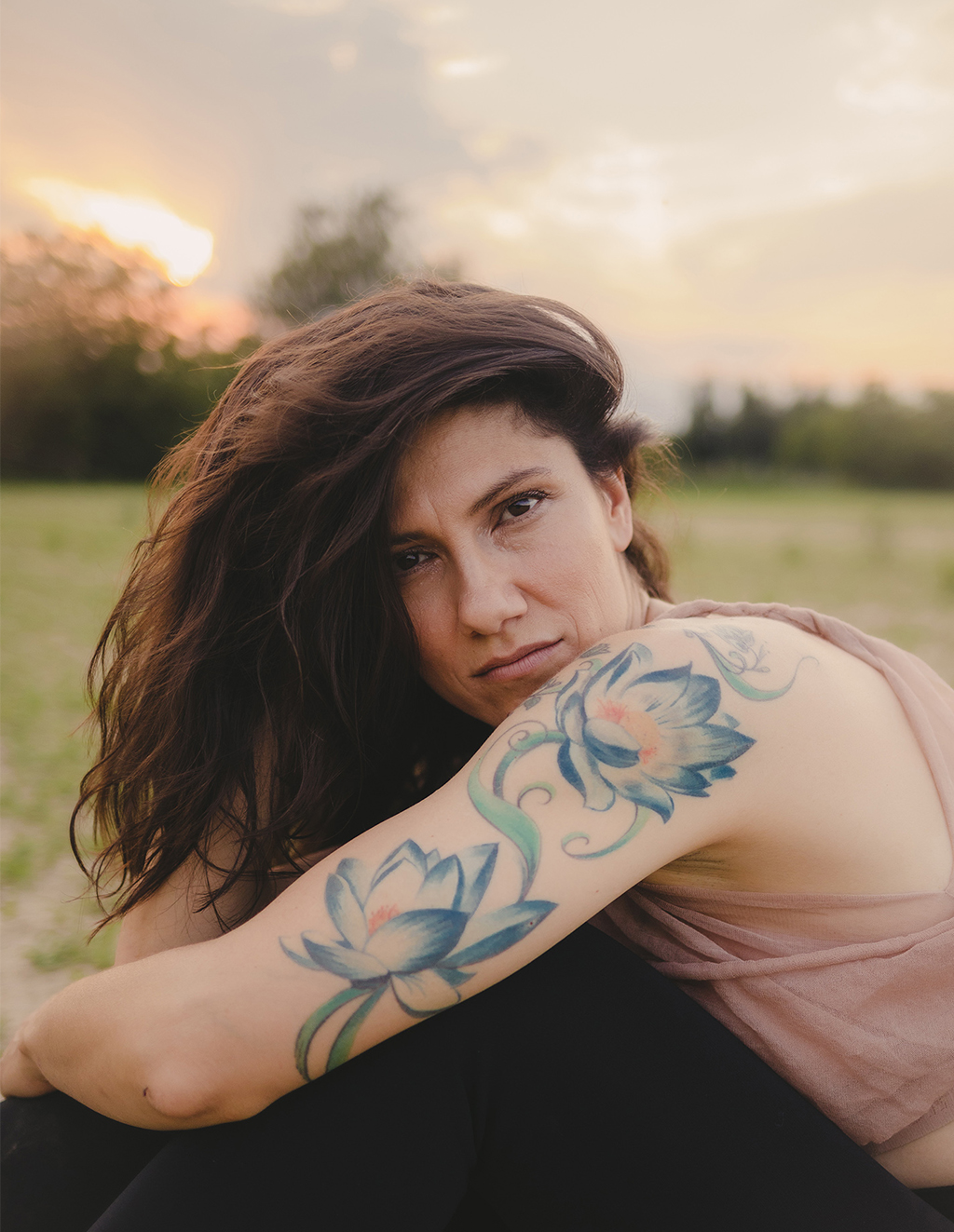
- Elisa in 2020
- Born: Elisa Toffoli; 19 December 1977 (age 48); Trieste, Friuli-Venezia Giulia, Italy
- Occupations: Singer; songwriter; record producer
- Years active: 1996–present
- Musical career
- Origin: Monfalcone, Friuli-Venezia Giulia, Italy
- Genres: Pop; alternative rock; pop rock
- Instruments: Vocals; piano; guitar; bass; percussion; organ; flute
- Labels: Sugar; Universal Music Italy

Elisa Toffoli (born 19 December 1977), known mononymously as Elisa, is an Italian singer, songwriter and record producer. She draws inspiration from many genres such as pop, alternative rock, electronica, and trip hop, recording songs both in Italian and English, which she considers her artistic primary language.

In Europe, she rose in fame for her double single "Come Speak to Me", English version of Sanremo Music Festival's winning song "Luce (Tramonti a nord est)", while she became famous in North America for "Dancing", featured in both the 2006 and 2007 seasons of So You Think You Can Dance. On 18 December 2012, her collaboration with Ennio Morricone, "Ancora qui", was featured in Quentin Tarantino's film Django Unchained soundtrack album, which was nominated at the Grammy Award for Best Compilation Soundtrack for Visual Media in 2014.

Elisa has released eleven studio albums, five compilations, three live albums, eight video albums and 60 singles, topping the Italian Albums Chart five times and selling over 20 million records worldwide, of which 5.5 million copies certified by Musica e dischi and over 3 million units by FIMI since 2009, with a diamond album and several multiplatinum certifications. Elisa recorded songs with international artists such as Tina Turner, Muse, Imagine Dragons, and Italian artists from different music genres, including Luciano Ligabue, Negramaro, Andrea Bocelli, Cesare Cremonini, Mahmood and Rkomi. She also wrote and produced songs and albums for Francesca Michielin, Elodie, Alessandra Amoroso, Giorgia and Mina.

Throughout her career, Elisa has been recognized by the major Italian awards, including a total of seven awards at the Sanremo Music Festival with "Luce (Tramonti a nord est)" (2001) and "O forse sei tu" (2022), one Targa Tenco, two Lunezia Awards, 13 Italian, Wind & Music Awards, one award at the Festivalbar, and an MTV Europe Music Award. She also wrote and composed songs for films directed by Giovanni Veronesi, Alessandro D'Alatri, Luca Guadagnino, winning a David di Donatello and a Nastro d'Argento for Best Original Song.

== Early life ==
Elisa Toffoli was born on 19 December 1977 in Trieste, in Friuli-Venezia Giulia, north-eastern Italy. She grew up in Monfalcone, Friuli-Venezia Giulia, and lived in a border area, where she had the opportunity to listen to different languages and experience various cultures. Her early influences include Björk, PJ Harvey, Tori Amos, Aretha Franklin and Ella Fitzgerald, and she has credited Rudyard Kipling and Jim Morrison of The Doors as lyrical inspirations. She began writing songs at the age of 11 and later played in several local bands. At the age of 15, she appeared in a karaoke TV program, Karaoke, hosted by Rosario Fiorello.

== Career ==
=== 2000s ===
At the age of 16, Elisa met Caterina Caselli, who signed her to the record company Sugar Music the following year. At the age of 18, she left for Berkeley, California to work on songs for her debut album with record producer Corrado Rustici, who has also worked with Whitney Houston, Aretha Franklin and Zucchero.

Elisa's first single, "Sleeping in Your Hand", was released in late May 1997, followed by her debut album Pipes & Flowers on 22 September. She was credited as a writer or co-writer on all tracks. The album soon went quadruple platinum in Italy and won two awards: Targa Tenco and Premio Italiano Della Musica (PIM). She was also a special guest on Eros Ramazzotti's European tour. In 1998, the re-release of Pipes & Flowers included a new track, Cure Me, recorded in Venice with British producer Darren Allison (Spiritualized, Belle and Sebastian).

On 5 May 2000, Elisa released Asile's World (Asile being Elisa written backwards). The album featured songs produced by Howie B, Roberto Vernetti, Mauro Malavasi and Leo Z.

In September 2000, Elisa recorded her first song in Italian, "Luce (Tramonti a nord est)". The song was initially written in English, but the Italian lyrics were written in collaboration with singer Zucchero. The song was performed at the 2001 Sanremo Festival, supported by the Solis String Quartet, and won her the Critics' Award, Interpreter of the Year as well as the competition altogether. Both Italian and English versions were later included in a re-release of Asile's World. In November of the same year, she was awarded three prizes at the Italian Music Awards: Best Female Artist, Best Single (Luce) and Best Song, as well as winning the Best Italian Artist at the 2001 MTV Europe Music Awards in Frankfurt. She also received Premio Italiano Della Musica's Best Female Artist and Best Single (Luce).

Elisa's third album, Then Comes the Sun was released on 9 November 2001, with Corrado Rustici returning as producer. The album featured a more pop/rock genre and went triple platinum. In 2002, she performed both at the closing of the 2002 Winter Olympics in Salt Lake City, Utah, singing a jazzy version of the Italian national hymn; and at the 2002 Pavarotti and Friends concert, singing Voglio vivere così (col sole in fronte) with the world-famous tenor.

In August 2002, Sugar Music released an international album, titled Elisa. It is a selection of songs from her first three albums with Come Speak to Me, the original English version of her hit Luce. The single received high rotation on MTV Europe as well as fair airplay and moderate attention in several European countries, but still failed to establish Elisa as an international artist.

In late 2003, Elisa released the album Lotus, an acoustic album featuring new, stripped-down versions of some of her songs, as well as a handful of new ones, including a cover version of Leonard Cohen's "Hallelujah". The album was followed by an extensive acoustic Italian tour and a double DVD set, consisting of an MTV Supersonic concert and The making of Lotus.

Elisa's fourth studio album Pearl Days was released on 15 October 2004. All tracks were produced by Glen Ballard, known for producing Alanis Morissette's Jagged Little Pill and tracks for artists such as Anastacia, Michael Jackson, Shakira, Christina Aguilera and The Corrs. The album was more rock influenced and sported more electric guitars than her earlier records. One of the songs, Life Goes On, was later translated to Italian (Una poesia anche per te) and became the fourth best-selling single of 2005 in Italy. The single was accompanied by a self-directed video, which won the Premio Videoclip Italiano (PVI) for Best Female Artist. In the summer of 2005, Elisa appeared at the Live 8 concert in Rome alongside Zucchero, Luciano Ligabue, and other major Italian artists.

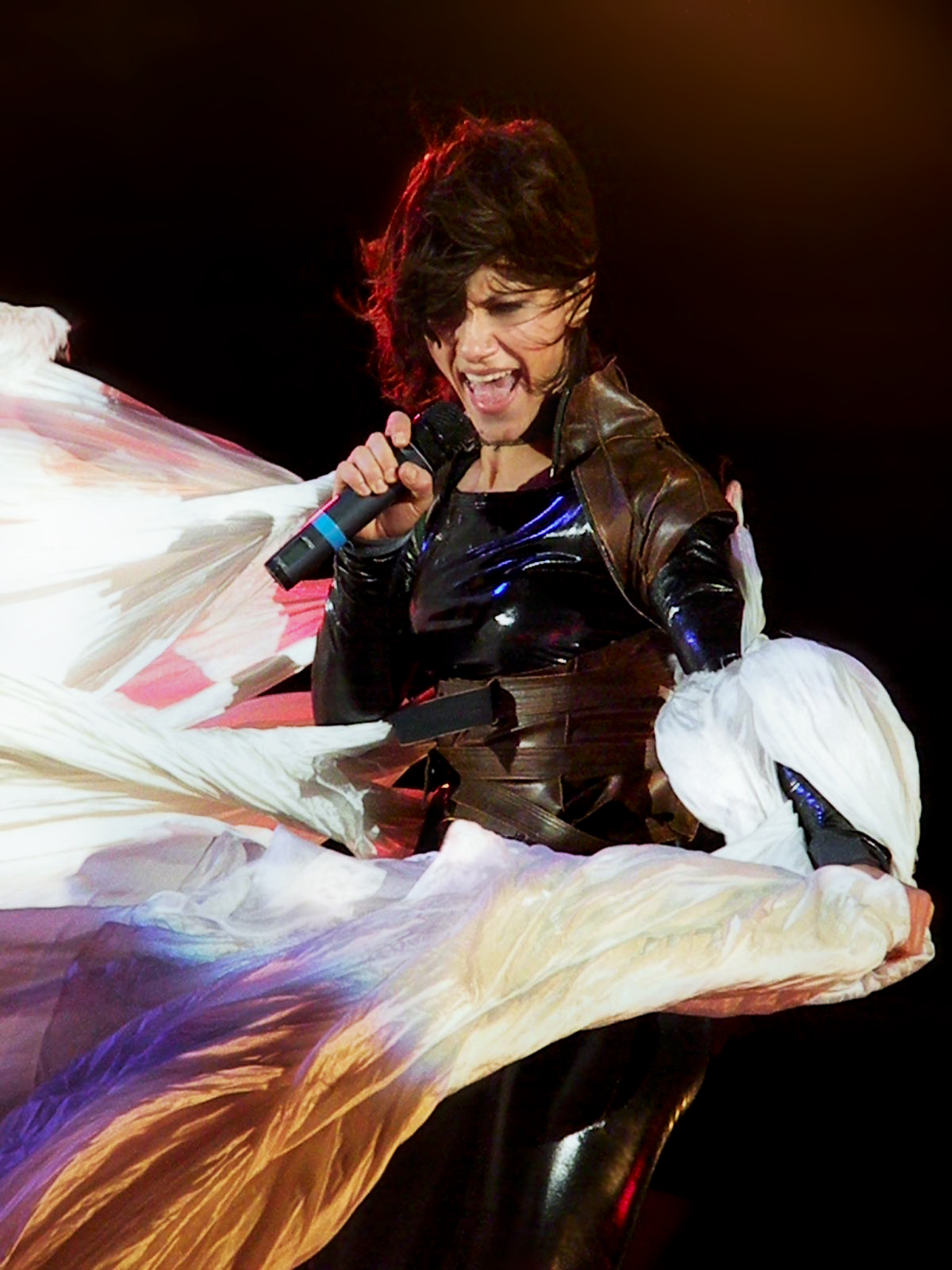
Elisa during the Mechanical Dream Tour in Milan, 7 October 2008

Two non-album singles were released in 2005 and 2006, titled Swan and Teach Me Again (duet with Tina Turner) respectively. Both supported major Italian films, namely Melissa P. and All the Invisible Children (Segment 9: Song Song & Little Cat directed by John Woo). Elisa also performed Luce (Tramonti a nord est) at the closing ceremony of the 2006 Winter Olympics in Turin.

On 17 November 2006, Soundtrack '96-'06 was released, a collection of hits from her first ten years as a recording artist. The album also contained four new songs; three in Italian and one in English. The album peaked at number 1, was certified diamond and became the third best-selling album of 2006 in Italy, with more than 700,000 copies sold. A revised edition, titled Caterpillar, was released in September 2007, aimed at the international market. Several of the songs had been remixed, rearranged and partly rerecorded, and it featured an entirely new cover version of The Rolling Stones' song Wild Horses. The box set Soundtrack Live '96-'06 was released on 23 November 2007, containing a CD and DVD from a Milan concert during the 2007 Soundtrack Live Tour.

In the wake of Elisa's increased popularity due to her song Dancing appearing on So You Think You Can Dance, another compilation album, named Dancing, was released in the US on 15 July 2008. Being the singer's first album available in the US, it is recognised as her American debut.

Elisa released her next album, Heart, on 13 November 2009. The first single was Ti vorrei sollevare, with Giuliano Sangiorgi from Italian rock band Negramaro. The album also contains a collaboration with Antony Hegarty from Antony and the Johnsons on the song "Forgiveness". On 30 November 2010, Elisa released Ivy, an acoustic album, featuring three new tracks, acoustic versions of her past songs and covers such as "1979" by the Smashing Pumpkins. The album sold over 80,000 copies in Italy and was further supported by a tour. In the same year, Elisa collaborated with music producer and musician Gaudi for the track "Brainwashed Again", included on his album "No Prisoners".

=== 2012–2016: L'anima vola, On and new projects ===
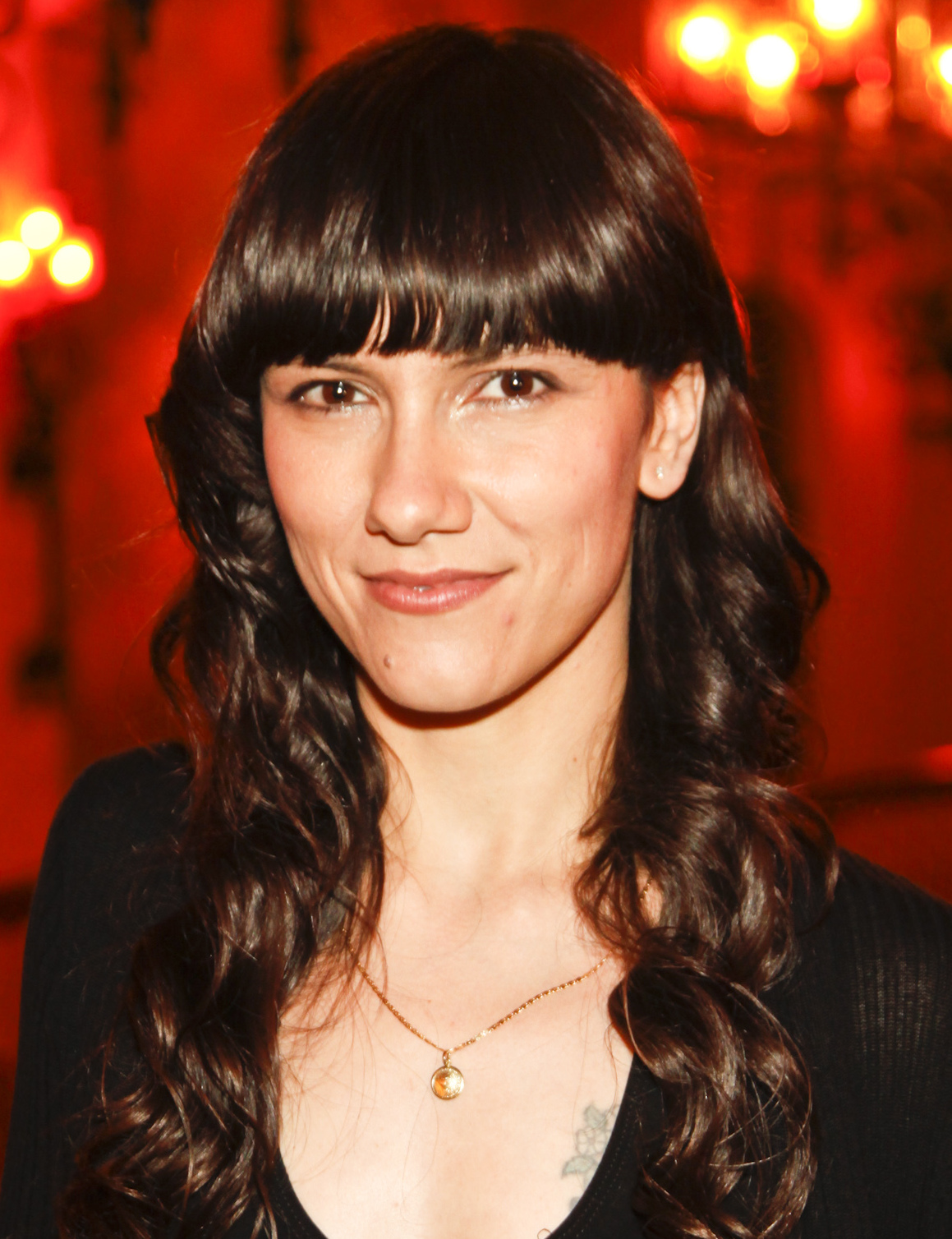
Elisa at the 2012 Miami International Film Festival for the North American premiere of Someday This Pain Will Be Useful to You

In 2012, the song "Love Is Requited", written by Andrea Guerra and Michele von Buren for the soundtrack of Roberto Faenza's film Someday This Pain Will Be Useful to You and performed by Elisa, received a Nastro d'Argento for Best Original Song. On 18 December 2012, her collaboration with Ennio Morricone, "Ancora qui", was featured in Quentin Tarantino's film, Django Unchained and on its soundtrack album.

On 15 October 2013, L'anima vola, Elisa's first album recorded entirely in Italian, was released. In early August, the album was certified double platinum by the Federation of the Italian Music Industry. Elisa was featured on a special version of "We Are Incurable Romantics" by Belgian singer Ozark Henry, which was released in the Italian iTunes store on 15 July 2014.

In 2015, Elisa was the coach and artistic director of the blue team in the talent show Amici di Maria De Filippi. Her team won the singer category with the band The Kolors, whom she collaborated with on their second studio album Out. Elisa also returned to the role in the following two seasons, coaching Elodie Di Patrizi, Riki and Federica Carta.

On 15 January 2016, "No Hero" was released as the lead single from Elisa's ninth studio album, On, the first English language album after L'anima vola. The song debuted at number eight on the Italian Singles Charts and received triple Platinum certifications from FIMI. The album was recorded in English with two Italian-language tracks: "Bruciare per te" and a collaboration called "Sorrido già" with Emma Marrone and Giuliano Sangiorgi. It debuted at number one on the FIMI Albums Chart, becoming the singer-songwriter's fourth album to top the chart. Two additional singles came from the album: "Love me forever" and "Bruciare per te". Between November and December 2016, Elisa began touring in Italy, the United Kingdom and Ireland.

=== 2017–2019: Label change, Diari aperti and The Lion King ===
In 2017, Elisa ended her deal with Sugar Music and signed with Universal Music Group under the label Island Records. In the same year, Elisa celebrated the 20th anniversary of her career with the Together Here We Are event, which consisted of four concerts at the Verona Arena. The live event was anticipated by the last record project with Sugar Music Soundtrack '97-'17, which debuted at number four on the Italian Album Charts. On 22 September 2017, "Ogni istante" was released as Elisa's first single with Universal Music. The profits from the single were donated to municipalities in central Italy affected by the earthquakes in 2016 and 2017.

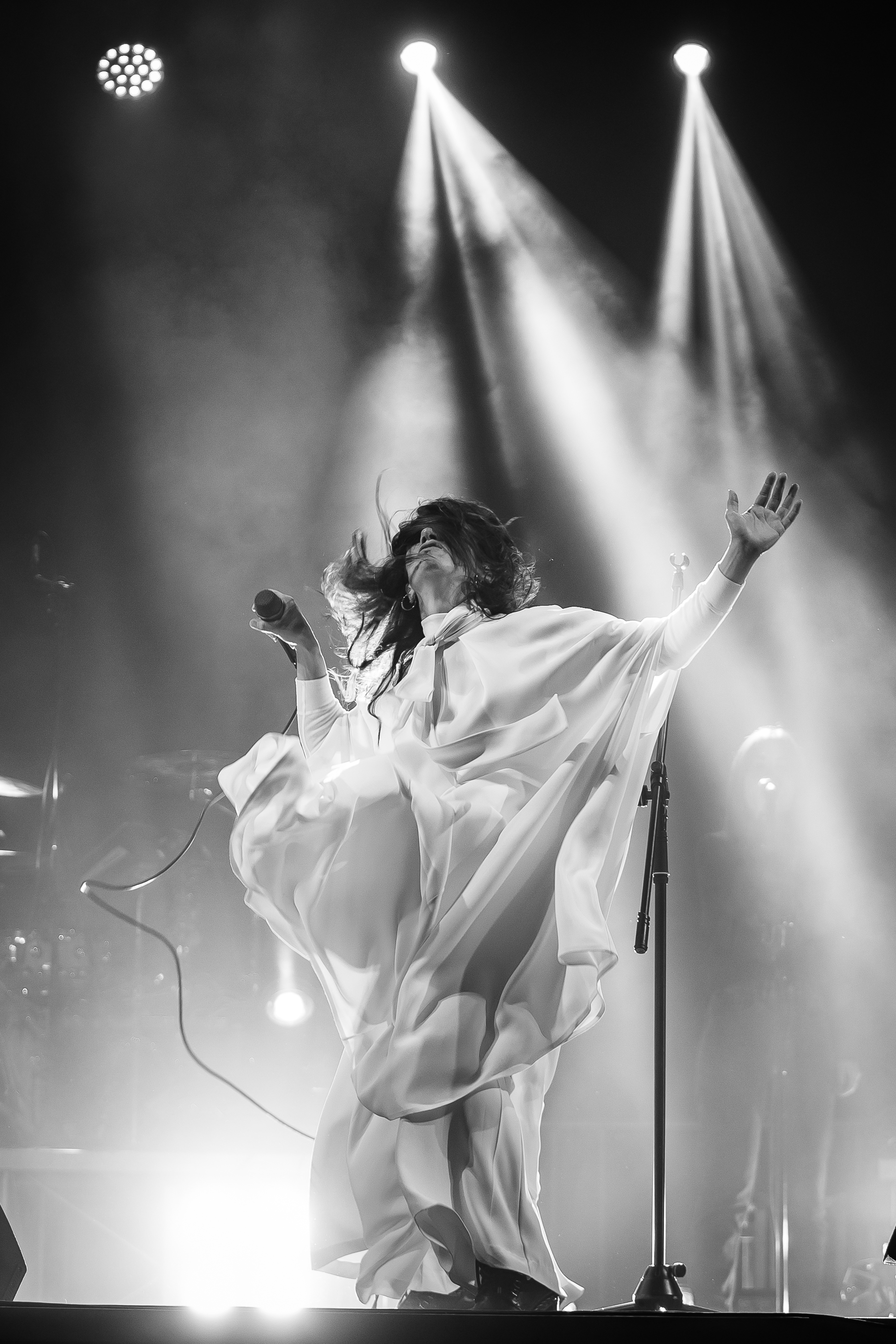
Elisa performing at Diari Aperti Tour

Elisa released her tenth studio album Diari aperti through Universal Music Group on 26 October 2018, which debuted at number two on the Italian Albums Chart. The album's lead single, "Se piovesse il tuo nome", peaked at number four on the FIMI Italian chart and at number one on the Italian Airplay Chart for nine weeks. In January 2019, Elisa released the album's second single, "Anche fragile", singing it at the Sanremo Music Festival 2019 where she appeared as a special guest. In May 2019, "Vivere tutte le vite", featuring rapper Carl Brave, was released as the album's third single. She published the fifth single "Tua per sempre" on September 17. The singer announced that an expanded version of the album, Diari aperti (Segreti Svelati), would be released on 15 November 2019 with a total of 21 tracks, stemming from the tenth album Diari aperti and the English extended play Secret Diaries. The album featured collaborations with Carmen Consoli, Brunori Sas and Rkomi. The lead single of the expanded album, in collaboration with Rkomi, was "Blu Part II", published on 8 November 2019.

In 2019, Elisa was chosen by Walt Disney Animation Studios to dub the voice of Nala in the animated film The Lion King, premiering in Italy on 21 August 2019. Nala was voiced by pop-star Beyoncé in the original. Elisa also sung the Italian version of "Spirit" and "Can You Feel the Love Tonight" with Marco Mengoni, who voiced Simba. In 2019, Elisa was also involved in several collaborations, including "Blu" with Rkomi, the Imagine Dragons' song "Birds" (the fifth single from their fourth album Origins), and on the album Note di viaggio – Capitolo 1: venite avanti... by Francesco Guccini and Mauro Pagani, where the singer reinterpreted the song "Auschwitz".

=== 2020–2023: Sanremo Festival comeback, Ritorno al futuro/Back to the Future and Intimate ===
On 6 March 2020, Marracash released a new single, titled "Neon – Le ali", from the album Persona. The single featured Elisa, and peaked at number five on the Italian Singles Chart. On 10 April 2020, Elisa published the collaboration "Andrà tutto bene" with Tommaso Paradiso, written during the quarantine due to the COVID-19 pandemic in Italy. On 20 November 2020, Luciano Ligabue published a collaboration with Elisa, titled "Volente o nolente", the second extract from his album 7. In December 2021, Elisa performed the song "Alice!", the title track of the eponymous show written and directed by Simone Ferrari and Lulu Helbaek. "Alice!" was composed by John Metcalfe, a composer for U2, Coldplay, Peter Gabriel and Blur. In 2021, Elisa announced on social networks that she was working on her eleventh studio album. In the same year, she was also featured on Mahmood's single "Rubini", from the rapper's album Ghettolimpo.

On 24 November 2021, the single "Seta" was released in anticipation of Elisa's eleventh album, Ritorno al futuro/Back to the Future. The album, which is a double record with songs in Italian on the first record and English on the second, was released on 18 February 2022, and became Elisa's fifth number-one album on the Italian Albums Chart. It featured the single "O forse sei tu", performed by Elisa during the 2022 Sanremo Music Festival, where it took second place in the final ranking and was recognized with the "Giancarlo Bigazzi" award for best musical composition. On 6 May 2022, Elisa released "Litoranea" as the third single from the album, followed by a collaboration track "Palla al centro" with Jovanotti.

From 28 June to 24 September 2022, Elisa embarked on the environmentally friendly Back to the Future Live Tour in Italy, which was followed by an eight-date European tour. The recordings of the three opening concerts, held at the Verona Arena, were used for the live album Back to the Future Live. On 16 December 2022, "Come te nessuno mai" was released as the album's fifth single. Between December 2022 and January 2023, Elisa performed An Intimate Night, a theatre tour that featured the artistic direction of Dardust.

Throughout 2022, Elisa wrote and composed two songs for Italian singer Elodie: "Bagno a mezzanotte" and an original song "Proiettili (ti mangio il cuore)" for the soundtrack of the film Burning Hearts, directed by Pippo Mezzapesa. The latter won the David di Donatello award for Best Original song and was nominated in the same category at the Nastro d'Argento. She was also featured on a bilingual version of Muse's song, "Ghosts (How Can I Move On)", released on 25 November 2022.

In 2023, Elisa had a guest appearance at the 2023 Sanremo Music Festival, performing with Giorgia. The duo performed a mash up of Elisa's song "Luce (Tramonti a nord est)" and Giorgia's "Di sole e d'azzurro". Throughout 2023, she collaborated with Negramaro and Jovanotti on the single "Diamanti", with La Rappresentante di Lista on Zef & Marz's debut single "Tilt", and with Soen on "Hollowed". On 24 November 2023, Elisa published the single "Quando nevica" form her compilation album Intimate - Recording at Abbey Road Studios, recorded with Dardust at the Abbey Road Studios in London.

=== 2024–present: San Siro show and “Kintsugi” ===
In November 2024, Elisa published the single "Dillo solo al buio", and she was featured as songwriter and producer on Cesare Cremonini's eight studio album Alaska Baby. On 11 April 2025 Cremonini published the collaboration "Nonostante tutto" with Elisa as the third single from his studio album. Elisa performed for the first time at Milan's San Siro Stadium on 18 June 2025 with a sold-out show. The concert live-recorded album San Siro Live 2025 was published in November 2025. On September her relationship with Andrea Rigonat ended, but they remain still now in good relations and in artistic collaboration. On 27 March 2026 Elisa collaborated on Blanco's single "Ricordi" from his third studio album Ma'.

On May 14, 2026, Elisa published the single “Amore è” (Love is..), anticipating the new album, announced officially on September, 8 with the name “Kintsugi”, as the other single released three days later. The album will be published on November, 27.

On September 11, 2027, she will perform at RCF Arena “Campovolo” in Reggio Emilia to celebrate the 30 years from the first album, Pipes and Flowers.

== Personal life ==
Elisa and Andrea Rigonat (guitarist and band member) had their first child on 22 October 2009. Their daughter was born on 20 May 2013. They married in Grado on 5 September 2015.

They got separated in september, 2025, but it was communicated only one year later.

== Philanthropy ==
In 2004, she wrote "Together", a song against war crimes and dictatorships.

In 2017, Elisa donated the profits from the single "Ogni istante" to municipalities in central Italy affected by the earthquakes in 2016 and 2017.

In 2021, she became an ambassador for Save the Children to support humanitarian aid for Syrian children affected by the Syrian Civil War.

== Discography ==
- Pipes & Flowers (1997)
- Asile's World (2000)
- Then Comes the Sun (2001)
- Lotus (2003)
- Pearl Days (2004)
- Heart (2009)
- Ivy (2010)
- L'anima vola (2013)
- On (2016)
- Diari aperti (2018)
- Ritorno al futuro/Back to the Future (2022)

== Filmography ==
Year	Title	Role	Notes
2012	Agneepath	Narrator	Italian voice-over role
2016	Trolls	Princess Poppy (voice)	Italian voice-over role
2019	Dumbo	Miss Atlantis (voice)	Italian voice-over role
2019	The Lion King	Nala (voice)	Italian voice-over role
2020	Cobra non è	Herself	Cameo appearance
2024	Mufasa: The Lion King	Nala (voice)	Italian voice-over role

=== Television ===
Year	Title	Role	Notes
2015–2017	Amici di Maria De Filippi	Herself	Coach (seasons 14–16); pre-selection judge (season 17)
2017	Elisa - 20 anni in ogni istante	Herself	Television special, pre-recorded live concert in Verona Arena
2023	Elisa - An intimate night	Herself	Television special, pre-recorded live concert
2023	Elisa Buon Nataleanchea te	Herself	Television special, pre-recorded live concert
2024	Andrea Bocelli: The 30th Anniversary	Herself	Music guest; Television special, pre-recorded live concert
2025	Elisa - San Siro	Herself	Television special, pre-recorded live concert
2025	Pino è - Il viaggio del musicante	Herself	Television special, pre-recorded live concert

== Theatrography ==
Music director

Title	Years	Role	Location	Notes
Ellis Island	2002	Felicita Sapegno	Teatro Massimo, Palermo	Stage musical; Directed by Marco Baliani; Music by Giovanni Sollima; Music direction by Todd Reynolds
Hair	2008–2009	–	Teatro delle Erbe, Milan	Stage musical; Music direction by Elisa; Direction by Giampiero Solari and Luca Tommassini; Choreography by David Parsons

== Accolades ==
Ceremony	Year	Category	Nominated work	Result	Ref.
Academy Awards	2013	Best Original Song	"Ancora qui"	Shortlisted	
All Music Italia Awards	2016	Album of the Year	On	Nominated	
All Music Italia Awards	2022	Female Artist of the Year	Herself	Won	
All Music Italia Awards	2022	Album of the Year	Ritorno al Futuro/Back to the Future	Nominated	
All Music Italia Awards	2022	Best Tour	Back to the Future Live Tour	Nominated	
Billboard Italia Women in Music	2026	Impact Award	Herself	Honored	
David di Donatello	2007	Best Original Song	"Eppure sentire (un senso di te)" (from Manual of Love 2 as performer and songwriter)	Nominated	
David di Donatello	2023	Best Original Song	"Proiettili (Ti mangio il cuore)" (from Burning Hearts as a songwriter)	Won	
Festivalbar	2007	Special Award	Herself	Won	
Georgia Film Critics Association	2012	Best Original Song	"Ancora qui"	Nominated	
Italian Music Awards	2001	Best Italian Female Artist	Herself	Won	
Italian Music Awards	2001	Best Italian Single	"Luce (Tramonti a nord est)"	Won	
Italian Music Awards	2001	Best Music Composition	"Luce (Tramonti a nord est)"	Won	
Italian Music Awards	2001	Best Italian Videoclip	"Luce (Tramonti a nord est)"	Nominated	
Italian Music Awards	2002	Best Italian Female Artist	Herself	Nominated	
Italian Music Awards	2002	Best Italian Touring Act	Herself	Nominated	
Italian Music Awards	2002	Best Italian Album	Then Comes the Sun	Nominated	
Italian Music Awards	2003	Best Italian Female Artist	Herself	Nominated	
MTV Europe Music Awards	2001	Best Italian Act	Herself	Won	
MTV Europe Music Awards	2004	Best Italian Act	Herself	Nominated	
MTV Europe Music Awards	2007	Best Italian Act	Herself	Nominated	
Nastro d'Argento	2007	Best Original Song	"Eppure sentie (Un senso di te)"	Nominated	
Nastro d'Argento	2012	Best Original Song	"Love Is Requited"	Won	
Nastro d'Argento	2014	Best Original Song	"Ecco che"	Nominated	
Nastro d'Argento	2023	Best Original Song	"Proiettili (Ti mangio il cuore)" (from Burning Hearts as a songwriter)	Nominated	
Onstage Awards	2014	Best Female Artist	Herself	Nominated	
Onstage Awards	2014	Best Live Performance	"L'Anima Vola"	Nominated	
Onstage Awards	2014	Best Tour	L'Anima Vola Tour	Nominated	
Onstage Awards	2016	Most Performed Radio Artist	Herself	Won	
Onstage Awards	2018	Best Female Artist	Herself	Won	
Pavarotti D'Oro	2019	Honoree	Herself	Won	
Premio Anima	2006	Solidarity Award: Music	"Teach Me Again" (con Tina Turner)	Won	
Premio Italiano della Musica	1998	Italian Breakthrough Artist of the Year	Herself	Won	
Premio Italiano della Musica	2001	Italian Female Artist of the Year	Herself	Nominated	
Premio Italiano della Musica	2002	Italian Female Artist of the Year	Herself	Won	
Premio Italiano della Musica	2002	Song of the Year	"Luce (Tramonti a nord est)"	Won	
Premio Lunezia	2005	Songwriter of the Year - Song	"Una poesia anche per te"	Won	
Premio Lunezia	2014	Songwriter of the Year - Album	L'Anima Vola	Won	
Premio Regia Televisiva	2015	Best Television Program	Amici di Maria De Filippi (as arti director)	Won	
Premio Videoclip Italiano	2004	Best Artistic Contamination Video	"Togheder"	Won	
Premio Videoclip Italiano	2005	Best Female Video of the Year	"Una poesia anche per te"	Won	
Premio Videoclip Italiano	2007	Best Female Video of the Year	"Eppure sentire"	Won	
Rockol Awards	2022	Best Album	Ritorno al futuro/Back to the Future	Nominated	
Rockol Awards	2022	Best Live	Back to the Future Live Tour	Nominated	
Rockol Awards	2023	Best Live	Intimate Nights	Won	
Rockol Awards	2024	Best Live	An Intimate Christmas	Pending	
Sanremo Music Festival	2001	Sanremo Music Festival - Champions Section	"Luce (Tramonti a nord est)"	Won	
Sanremo Music Festival	2001	Mia Martini Critics' Prize	"Luce (Tramonti a nord est)"	Won	
Sanremo Music Festival	2001	Radio and TV Critics' Prize	"Luce (Tramonti a nord est)"	Won	
Sanremo Music Festival	2001	Best Performance	Herself	Won	
Sanremo Music Festival	2001	Songwriter Award	Herself	Won	
Sanremo Music Festival	2022	Best Song	"O Forse Sei Tu"	Runner-up	
Sanremo Music Festival	2022	Best Music Composition	"O Forse Sei Tu"	Won	
Targa Tenco	1998	Best Debut Album	Pipes & Flowers	Won	
Targa Tenco	2022	Best Song	"O Forse Sei Tu" (as a songwriter with Davide Petrella)	Won	
TIM Music Awards	2007	Diamond Disc Award	Soundtrack '96-'06	Won	
TIM Music Awards	2008	Multi Platinum Disc Award	Soundtrack '96-'06 Live	Won	
TIM Music Awards	2009	Best Show Award	The Mechanical Dream Show	Won	
TIM Music Awards	2009	Best Arena Non-Opera Show	The Mechanical Dream Show	Won	
TIM Music Awards	2010	Platinum Single Award	"Ti Vorrei Sollevare" (with Giuliano Sangiorgi)	Won	
TIM Music Awards	2010	Multi Platinum Disc Award	Heart	Won	
TIM Music Awards	2011	Platinum Disc Award	Ivy	Won	
TIM Music Awards	2014	Platinum Single Award	"L'Anima Vola"	Won	
TIM Music Awards	2014	Platinum Disc Award	L'Anima Vola	Won	
TIM Music Awards	2014	Composition and Lyrics Award	"Vivendo adesso" (as a songwriter)	Won	
TIM Music Awards	2015	Multi Platinum Disc Award	L'Anima Vola	Won	
TIM Music Awards	2016	Platinum Single Award	"No Hero"	Won	
TIM Music Awards	2016	Gold Disc Award	On	Won	
TIM Music Awards	2017	Live Award	On Tour	Won	
TIM Music Awards	2018	Live Award	Together Here We Are	Won	
TIM Music Awards	2019	Multi Platinum Single Award	"Se piovesse il tuo nome"	Won	
TIM Music Awards	2019	Platinum Disc Award	Diari Aperti	Won	
TIM Music Awards	2019	Live Award	Diari Aperti Live nei Teatri	Won	
TIM Music Awards	2022	Arena di Verona Special Award	Herself	Won	
TIM Music Awards	2022	Gold Disc Award	Ritorno al futuro/Back to the Future	Won	
TIM Music Awards	2022	Live Award	Back to the Future Live Tour	Won	
TIM Music Awards	2023	Live Award	Intimate Nights	Won	
TRL Awards	2011	Wonder Woman Award	Herself	Nominated	

Awards and achievements
Preceded by Piccola Orchestra Avion Travel with "Sentimento"	Sanremo Music Festival; Winner; 2001	Succeeded by Matia Bazar with "Messaggio d'amore"
