= Ecco che =

Single by Elisa

from the album L'anima vola
- Language: Italian
- Released: November 22, 2013
- Genre: Pop soul; pop rock
- Length: 3:53
- Label: Sugar Music
- Songwriter: Giuliano Sangiorgi
- Producer: Elisa Toffoli

Elisa singles chronology
"L'anima vola" (2013)	"Ecco che" (2013)	"Un filo di seta negli abissi" (2014)

Music video
- "Ecco che" on YouTube

"Ecco che" is a song by Italian singer Elisa, released on November 22, 2013 as the second single from her eighth studio album L'anima vola.

The song was includend on the soundtrack of The Fifth Wheel directed by Giovanni Veronesi, who also directed the music video of the song. In 2014 the song was nominated at the Nastro d'Argento for Best Original Song.

== Background and composition ==
The lyrics of the song were written by Negramaro's frontman Giuliano Sangiorgi, while the music was composed by Elisa, becoming the third song in which the two artists collaborate artistically after "Ti vorrei sollevare" (2009) and "Basta così" (2011). In an interview between the two artists for La Repubblica, Elisa said that Sangiorgi had heard some of the album's tracks during the Italia Loves Emilia benefit concert.

== Music video ==
The music video was directed by Giovanni Veronesi, who had already directed the video for Elisa for "Eppure sentire (Un senso di te)", and features the participation of actor Elio Germano. Elisa explained the aesthetics of the video: "Giovanni Veronesi ironically refers to it as a white-only video because it is very ethereal and based on the idea of a surreal space where brushstrokes of gray, writing a few minimal things, contrast with my figure and that of Elio Germano".

== Charts ==
Chart (2014)	Peak position
Italy (FIMI)	22
Italy (EarOne Airplay)	2

== Certifications ==
Region	Certification	Certified units/sales
Italy (FIMI)	Gold	15,000^{‡}
^{‡} Sales+streaming figures based on certification alone.
