= Anche fragile =

Single by Elisa

from the album Diari aperti
- Released: January 17, 2019
- Genre: Pop
- Length: 4:00
- Label: Universal
- Songwriter: Elisa Toffoli
- Producers: Elisa; Andrea Rigonat; Taketo Gohara

Elisa singles chronology
"Se piovesse il tuo nome" (2018)	"Anche fragile" (2019)	"Blu" (2019)

"Anche fragile" is a song by Italian singer Elisa, released through Universal on January 17, 2019, as the second single from her tenth studio album Diari aperti.

== Composition ==
The song, written and composed by Elisa herself, is the main track on the album Diari aperti, emphasizing the singer's dual personality of "strong" but also " vulnerable" depending on life circumstances. Excerpts of stanzas from the lyrics appear on the album cover.

In the re-release of the album under the title Diari aperti (segreti svelati), the song was performed in collaboration with Brunori Sas.

== Critics' reception ==
Simone Zani of AllMusic Italia described the song as "a powerful ballad with introspective lyrics". Reviewing the album, Mattia Marzi of Rockol defined the tracks "Anche fragile" and "Promettimi" as "sung in a whisper, almost whispered voice" and musically "accompanied by soft and elegant sounds". Mattia Barro of Rolling Stone Italia wrote that the production of the song "grants entire attention to the intimacy of these lyrics".

== Music video ==
The music video for the song was released on YouTube on 28 February 2018, to accompany the single's release. The video was directed by the duo YouNuts!, at the Bellinzaghi villa in Cernobbio, on Lake Como. The singer performed the song surrounded by images and cameo of her family: her husband Andrea Rigonat and children Emma Cecile and Sebastian.

== Charts ==
=== Weekly charts ===
Chart performance for "Anche fragile"
Chart (2019)	Peak position
Italy (FIMI)	18
Italy (EarOne Airplay)	12

=== Year-end charts ===
Chart (2019)	Position
Italy (FIMI)	75

== Certifications ==
Region	Certification	Certified units/sales
Italy (FIMI)	2× Platinum	140,000^{‡}
^{‡} Sales+streaming figures based on certification alone.
