= Dillo solo al buio =

Single by Elisa
- Language: Italian
- Released: 15 November 2024
- Genre: Pop rock; doo-wop
- Length: 3:45
- Label: Island; Universal
- Songwriters: Elisa Toffoli; Alessandro Raina; Davide Simonetta
- Producer: Andrea Rigonat

Elisa singles chronology
"Rimani Qui" (2024)	"Dillo solo al buio" (2024)	"Nonostante tutto" (2025)

Music video
- "Dillo solo al buio" on YouTube

"Dillo solo al buio" is a song recorded by Italian singer-songwriter Elisa. It was released on 15 November 2024 through Island Records and Universal Music Italy.

== Background and composition ==
After the release of the compilation Intimate – Recordings at Abbey Road Studios and the related solo single "Quando nevica" in December 2023, Elisa announced a recording hiatus. In October 2024, she collaborated with Andrea Bocelli on the song "Rimani Qui", a single taken from the tenor's compilation album Duets (30th Anniversary). On November 11, 2024, Elisa announced the release of "Dillo solo al buio". The song was written by Elisa herself with Alessandro Raina, Davide Simonetta and producer by her husband Andrea Rigonat. The singer explained the meaning of the song on her social networks:

"The song is a dedication to my best friend, she is one of the purest souls I have been lucky enough to meet. It's about a disappointment in love, but it's mostly about people who have the courage to be themselves and love to the core, and how that to others can also be scary unfortunately. And then there is in it the complicity of true friendship, of standing by each other in difficult times, of understanding each other without too many words."

== Critics reception ==
Alessandro Alicandri of TV Sorrisi e Canzoni wrote that the song sets itself on pop rock and doo wop ballad sounds, finding in it two different aspects: the first is "fragility", recounting "the insecurities of a woman who feels different from the standards", while the second is "courage", with coi invites "to see oneself with different eyes, to feel less alone", since "in conclusion one is saved by discovering that one is stronger than one's expectations". Andrea Conti of Il Fatto Quotidiano stated that it is a ballad whose lyrics "invite one to embrace one's vulnerability and spokesman for a message of hope for those who sometimes feel wrong, powerless or out of place", finding Elisa "sweet and powerful".

Vincenzo Nasto of Fanpage.it wrote that the song "recounts a woman's reaction, her suffering after the end of a relationship: however, it transforms as it goes along through a motivational message". Gabriele Fazio of Open also affirmed that the singer "abandons the classic ethereal atmospheres of her style to lean on a very pop, direct and effective song", describing it as "one of those songs that get stuck between the pages of a diary, in the dedication of a book given away".

== Charts ==
Chart (2024)	Peak position
Italy (FIMI)	47
Italy (EarOne Airplay)	2
San Marino (SMRRTV Top 50)	5

== Certifications ==
Certifications for "Dillo solo al buio"
Region	Certification	Certified units/sales
Italy (FIMI)	Gold	100,000^{‡}
^{‡} Sales+streaming figures based on certification alone.
