= Diamanti (song) =

Single by Negramaro, Elisa and Jovanotti

from the album Free Love
- Language: Italian
- Released: March 17, 2023
- Genre: Electropop
- Length: 3:30
- Label: Sugar, Universal
- Songwriters: Giuliano Sangiorgi; Elisa Toffoli; Lorenzo Cherubini
- Producers: Sixpm; Andro"

Negramaro singles chronology
"Ora ti canto il mare" (2021)	"Diamanti" (2023)	"Fino al giorno nuovo" (2023)

Elisa singles chronology
""Come te nessuno mai"" (2022)	"Diamanti" (2023)	"Tilt" (2023)

Jovanotti singles chronology
""Ricordati di vivere (il primo battito)"" (2023)	"Diamanti" (2023)	"Evviva!" (2021)

Music video
- "Diamanti" on YouTube

"Diamanti" is a song recorded by Italian band Negramaro and Italian singers Elisa and Jovanotti. It was released on March 17, 2023 through Sugar Music and Universal Music Italy as the lead single from the band ninth studio album Free Love.

== Background and composition ==
The song sees the Negramaro's frontman Giuliano Sangiorgi collaborating with the two artists again, following collaborations "Cade la pioggia" (2007) and "Safari" (2008) with Jovanotti and for the fourth time with Elisa, following "Basta così" (2011), "Ti vorrei sollevare" (2009) and "Sorrido già" with Emma Marrone, contained in the album On (2016). The song also was the second artistic collaboration between Elisa and Jovanotti subsequent to "Palla al centro", the fourth single from Elisa's 2022 studio album Ritorno al futuro/Back to the Future. Sangiorgi, Elisa and Jovanotti, appear as the song's authors, with production by Sixpm and Andrea "Andro" Mariano.

== Critics reception ==
The song received positive reviews by the Italian music critics.

Rockol wrote that the song is "more than a ballad" as it is "intense with changes of rhythm, dominated by three of the most recognizable voices in Italian music," writing that it begins with the use of keyboards and guitar but "opens up into a more syncopated rhythm when Jovanotti enters, then arrives at a straight chorus." Simona Marchetti of Il Corriere della Sera was also impressed by the interaction of the three artists, writing that "Negramaro's rock atmospheres blend with Elisa's vocals and Jovanotti's rap."

Fabio Fiume of All Music Italia gave the song a score of 8 out of 10, stating that through the song the three artists "show with this song that despite their long careers, they still have a lot to tell," since "it moves musically and melodically between the boundaries of the historic ballads of the Salentini, with the addition, however, of the recognizable character impetus of the other two artists." Fiume addressed the lyrics, calling them "a snapshot of a real, tangible relationship" not only of love but also of friendship, emphasizing that the use of "uneducated terms" are "the truth of the passages of a story" and not "the diseducative attempt to feel equal to the modern generation."

Giulia Ciavarelli of TV Sorrisi e Canzoni described the collaboration as an "intense ballad" with "rock sounds, sweeping rap, and hypnotic vocals that captivate on first listen," whose theme centers on "a total and universal love story." Also Agenzia ANSA wrote about the meaning of the song, writing that "relationships overcome all limits through empathy and forgiveness," finding Elisa's "hypnotic vocals" and Jovanotti's "overwhelming" through the narration of "poetic and evocative images."

== Music video ==
The music video for the song, directed by Francesco Lorusso, released on March 24, 2023 through the Negrmaro's YouTube channel.

== Charts ==
Chart (2023)	Peak position
Italy (FIMI)	40
Italy (EarOne Airplay)	9
San Marino (SMRRTV Top 50)	9

== Certifications ==
Region	Certification	Certified units/sales
Italy (FIMI)	Platinum	100,000^{‡}
^{‡} Sales+streaming figures based on certification alone.
