= Quando nevica =

Single by Elisa

from the album Intimate – Recordings at Abbey Road Studios
- Language: Italian
- Released: 24 November 2023
- Studio: Abbey Road Studios
- Genre: Power ballad
- Length: 3:30
- Label: Island; Universal
- Songwriters: Elisa Toffoli; Dario Faini; Edoardo D'Erme
- Producer: Dardust

Elisa singles chronology
"Tilt" (2023)	"Quando nevica" (2023)	"Rimani Qui" (2024)

Music video
- "Quando nevica" on YouTube

"Quando nevica" is a song recorded by Italian singer-songwriter Elisa. It was released on 24 November 2023 through Island Records and Universal Music Italy as the lead single from her seventh compilation album Intimate - Recordings at Abbey Road Studios.

== Background and composition ==
Following the release of the solo single "Come te nessuno mai", the final one from Elisa's eleventh studio album Ritorno al futuro/Back to the Future, between December 2022 and January 2023 Elisa embarked on An Intimate Night, a tour in theaters featuring Dardust as artistic collaborator and musician. Throughout 2023 Elisa participated exclusively as a guest artist in other projects, including in the singles "Diamanti by Negramaro and Jovanotti and "Tilt", by Italian producers Zef and Marz. In September 2023 she announced An Intimate Christmas, a double show at the Mediolanum Forum in Milan in collaboration with Dardust in December 2023.

""Quando nevica" was written by me, Edo and Dario here in my studio in Friuli. Writing with them was a party, we told stories to each other, Edo would improvise beautiful melodies and I would try to be his control tower, and then instead everything would turn around and I would improvise ideas with them guiding me. Dario was looking for harmony, chords-neither of us wanted a conventional thing. The story of the song is a personal story, very close to me, but it is not me. It's rare that I unveil the true stories of the songs, because I feel it's better for everyone to see their own story, and everyone has a different one."

The song was written by the singer herself with the collaboration of Dario Faini and Calcutta and it was recorded at Abbey Road Studios in London in the progress of arranging the songs for An Intimate Christmas. The track marks the first co-writing collaboration between Elisa and Calcutta, as well as the third song written by the latter for the singer after "Se piovesse il tuo nome" from 2018 and "Litoranea" from 2022.

== Critics reception ==
The song received positive reviews by the Italian music critics.

Mattia Marzi, in an analysis of the track for Rockol, described the song as a "Dancing 2.0" with which the singer "changes everything and disorients" compared to her last electropop single Tilt, proving that she is "one of the most versatile and unpredictable artists in Italian pop." Indeed, Marzi reported that the singer renounces "special effects, fireworks, glossy video clips, dance bodies, the idea of chasing the hit at all costs, reappropriating enchanting atmospheres." recalling atmospheres from "Luce (Tramonti a nord est)", "O forse sei tu" and the albums Lotus and Ivy, setting itself to "a piano ride, an acoustic guitar arpeggio and warm sounds" creating a musical setting that is "somewhat surreal and magical.

Alessandro Alicandri of TV Sorrisi e Canzoni wrote that the song comes across as "interesting lyrically and very well cared for musically." Alicandri pointed out the song does not have a precise theme, but that it tells of "an extraordinary figure, who has the unbelievable, who subverts reality" to which the listener can associate "the identity he or she prefers," with an "ironic and original subtext" that depicts "something elusive, which then at some point leaves us by walking away on the most beautiful."

Lorenza Ferraro of All Music Italia described the song as a ballad that "rests on the musical carpet of strings and piano" that enhances Elisa's voice. For the same site, Fabio Fiume gave a score of 7 out of 10 to the song, writing that there is "magic" in the singer's interpretation, in which "sweetness and strength unite and do not prevail, they travel on the same power of impact." Comparing the song to Elisa's collaboration with Calcutta in "Se piovesse il tuo nome", Fiume found "less images of metropolitan poetry," finding the textual and musical references "more courtly and a thread of fairy tale." Newsic. it gave the song a score of 7.5 out of 10, stating that it is a "ballad with winter tints" and "between virtuosity and essentiality" in which Elisa's voice "rests on the musical carpet of strings and piano."

== Music video ==
The official music video for the song was released on November 24, 2023, on the singer's official YouTube channel. The video was directed by YouNuts! in London and features cameo of Dardust.

== Charts ==
Chart (2023)	Peak position
Italy (FIMI)	38
Italy (EarOne Airplay)	10
San Marino (SMRRTV Top 50)	10
