= Remo Anzovino =

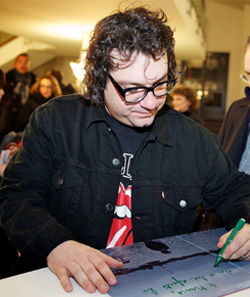
- Remo Anzovino after a live show in 2013

Background information
- Born: Remo Anzovino; 12 February 1976 (age 50); Pordenone, Friuli Venezia Giulia, Italy
- Genres: Jazz, pop music, contemporary classical music, ambient music, film score
- Occupations: Composer, musician, criminal lawyer
- Instrument: Piano
- Years active: 2006–present
- Label: Egea Music
- Website: remoanzovino.it

Remo Anzovino (born 12 February 1976) is an Italian composer, musician and criminal lawyer.

In the early years of his artistic activity, he composed music for theater and sound design; he later found its way into a personal relationship between silent cinema and music: by inverting the relationship between images and sounds, in his concerts he offers songs with the accompaniment of silent film sequences that serve as a sort of visual soundtrack. A strong visual element, the fusion of languages used, and the immediacy of the melodies are all peculiarities of his compositions.

== Biography ==
Anzovino was introduced to music at the age of 10, and he soon developed a natural aptitude for writing. In eighth grade he founded The Left Hand Band together with his school friends. The singer of the group was his brother Marco, three-years younger, who became a popular songwriter ("Radio1 Premio Recanati" plaque, 2001) and rhythm guitarist whom he shares each subsequent experience with. He recorded with the band in 1994 an album called Malìa (on cassette), nowhere to be found today.

In 1994, while he was still in high school, Anzovino was hired for his first stage music for a theater show from Fabio Scaramucci's Ortoteatro company, finding its way into the instrumental language. In the same year he began to work with some agencies for the music of promotional and commercial films. In 2002 he ventured for the first time with the music for a silent film commissioned by the Cineteca di Bologna. In the period 2002–2007 he gave a soundtrack to more than thirty silent films, mostly true masterpieces of the period, working with major film libraries and participating in festivals in the area, including the "Cinema Ritrovato" in Bologna (2004) and "Le giornate del Cinema Muto" in Pordenone (2003).

In 2005 he composed a score for symphony orchestra for the film Nanook of the North: A Story of Life and Love in the Actual Arctic premiered in the charming Piazza San Marco in Pordenone, with the simultaneous screening of the film, receiving more than 10 minutes of applause. The following year, the soundtrack won the Special Audience Award at the Bolzano "Rimusicazioni" festival. In 2005 he won second place in the Prix dedicated to Maestro Angelo Francesco Lavagnino. In 2007 he received the "Moret D'Aur" prize by a jury of twenty journalists of Friuli Venezia Giulia, as an Emerging Character in showbiz. In 2011 the same jury, after only four years, rewarded him with the "Moret D'Aur" as the representative showbiz personality of the region.

On 15 June 2006 he released his first album, Dispari (which collects a milonga inspired by Tina Modotti (Que viva Tina!), and some of the themes originally composed for silent movies – here reconceived in a completely autonomous way. The album reached the #1 position in the Italian jazz chart on iTunes, and all subsequent albums would do the same.

In March 2007, his composition "L'immagine ritrovata", taken from Dispari, was chosen by Simone Cristicchi as the main theme opening and closing the docu-movie about asylums "Dall'altra parte del cancello" (directed by Alberto Puliafito), which was attached to Cristicchi's eponymous album (Sony BMG) published in coincidence with the San Remo Festival victory: Cristicchi also used the composition in his theatrical performance"Centro di igiene mentale – Storie di matti e di manicomi".

On 3 September 2007 Anzovino was invited by Ente dello Spettacolo and La rivista del Cinematografo to perform at the 64th Venice Film Festival with a specifically written show. He proposed a new experiment: reversing the usual relationship between music and images accompanying the execution of songs with sequences taken from silent film masterpieces, making each piece match with a completely different movie. The music is the real protagonist, images comment her emotional/psychological content serving as a veritable visual track. On 17 January 2008 he participated in the Maurizio Costanzo Show on Canale 5 channel.

On 1 October 2008 he released his second album, Tabù, a musical meditation on contemporary transgressions. This album established him as the new revelation of the Italian instrumental music. A disc with a strong rhythmic vitality and ideally dedicated to the movement of the body as a tool of liberation of instincts. The rhythm section was headed by U.T. Gandhi and Danilo Gallo; Mauro Ottolini joined the album on trombone.

On 26 April 2010 Anzovino released his third album, Igloo – Piccola sinfonia per orchestra e duetti contemporanei, on which the encoded symphonic movements – entrusted to an orchestra of more than 40 elements – are counterpointed by the duets between Anzovino and some of the greatest Italian musicians on the international scene: with Franz Di Cioccio's drums (PFM), with the clarinet of Gabriele Mirabassi, with the bass of Enzo Pietropaoli, with the guitar of Bebo Ferra, and with the two Top Jazz 2009 artists (the annual referendum organized by the historic magazine "Musica Jazz") Francesco Bearzatti on saxophone and Luca Aquino on trumpet. It is a record that represents a bridge between classical music and the most contemporary jazz music. The cover was created by Davide Toffolo, one of the most important Italian cartoonists as well as leader of the punk rock band "Tre Allegri Ragazzi Morti". After working for the piano-drums duet of the title track of Igloo, Anzovino and Franz Di Cioccio consolidated their relationship into the project of a live set: Di Cioccio on drums and Anzovino on piano, one against another, to represent the clash between two fires, and the meeting of two generations of musicians and two worlds.

In December 2010, he featured as a special guest the album Primitivi del dub (La Tempesta Dischi) by "Tre Allegri Ragazzi Morti", produced by Paolo Baldini: he played Fender Rhodes and clavinet on the song "La rivolta dell'avvocato" (literally, "The lawyer's revolt"), so titled in his honor.

In March 2012 he participated together with Dargen D'Amico and Roberto Dellera from Afterhours, as music composer/piano special guest/string director on the album Fili invisibili (Metatron) by DJ Aladyn, in the eight-hands song "Mi vuoi bene".

In June 2012 signed the theme song and deadlifts for LA7 channel's show In Bianco e Nero, an early-evening summer programme of the black and white masterpieces of American cinema, including The Killing and Paths of Glory by Stanley Kubrick, Billy Wilder's Witness for the Prosecution, and The Great Dictator by Charlie Chaplin. The theme song chosen for the program was "Giostra", from the album Igloo.

On 8 October 2012 his fourth album Viaggiatore Immobile (Egea Music) was released, produced by sound designer Taketo Gohara, with orchestral arrangements by Stefano Nanni and cover signed by Oliviero Toscani. For the first time one of his discs was also released in LP format.

Some principal musicians of the orchestra of La Scala in Milan contributed to the album recordings – and with them some prominent musicians such as Vincenzo Vasi, Alessandro "Asso" Stefana, Mauro Ottolini, Edodea Quartet (directed by Edoardo De Angelis), Achille Succi. The disc ends with the song "9 Ottobre 1963 (Suite for Vajont)", performed with 42 male voices of the Ruda Polyphonic Choir directed by Fabiana Noro, in memory of the Vajont tragedy.

On 18 February 2013, the newspaper"Il Fatto Quotidiano published in its first page the incipit manuscript of "9 Ottobre 1963 (Suite for Vajont)" and the image of Anzovino with the heading "Soundtrack of the Week", reporting the following thought of the composer: "Music can sometimes help memory."

On 15 September 2013, the 50th anniversary of the disaster, Anzovino was invited by the Vajont Foundation (which brings together, among others, the municipalities of Longarone, Erto and Casso, Castellavazzo and Vajont) to hold a concert on the dam, in the heart of the landslide in Erto, that drew 2,000 people, in a climate of great emotion. The composition "9 Ottobre 1963 (Suite for Vajont)", which Anzovino opened and closed the concert with, was recognized by the Vajont Foundation as the official music of the memory of the tragedy.

On 7 October 2013, Anzovino won the "Premio Anima" award "to the growth of an ethical conscience – music section," for his composition "9 Ottobre 1963 (Suite for Vajont)", a piece composed by the pianist in memory of the Vajont tragedy. The award is given every year under the patronage of the Presidency of the Italian Republic to enhance the contribution made by the art world personalities and culture that have excelled in their respective categories for the value of content and communicative power of the message and the significant contribution to the growth of the culture of ethics and accountability in the country. The jury – chaired by Luigi Abete – gave this explanation to the award: " "9 Ottobre 1963 (Suite for Vajont)" is a strong and overwhelming composition showing Anzovino's great human and artistic sensitivity: only a son of that land could compose it."

On 2 December 2013, preceded by the single "No Smile (Buster Keaton)" – a homage to the comedian – the album Vivo was released. This was his first live album, and the fifth of his discography. It contained the recording of the concert held on 20 December 2013 at the "Auditorium Parco della Musica" in Rome, the DVD video of the "Concerto della Rimembranza" concert on the Vajont dam, and a collectible photo booklet with photos from the concert in Rome signed by Gianluca Moro. The album cover is a photo of the band that has accompanied Anzovino in the recordings, formed by Vincenzo Vasi, Marco Anzovino and Alberto Milani, taken in the tent/dressing room a few minutes before the concert on the Vajont dam.

In an interview with Ernesto Assante for Repubblica.it, Anzovino explained his choice: "I have always felt to be an unconventional pianist, I tried to form a band and put around the piano some new and original sound. I wanted to express a liberating idea of the piano, which becomes as the lead singer of a rock band in a concert that is definitely a party, where the Music changes night after night."

On 7 December 2013, the Lelio Luttazzi Foundation invited Anzovino to hold a special concert for piano solo in honor of the great artist from Trieste at the "Palazzo delle Esposizioni" in Rome, as the event of the exhibition "LelioSwing 50 anni di storia italiana".

On 19 April 2014, Vivo was released in a double LP gatefold 180-gram vinyl edition, with an attached DVD of the historic "Concerto della Memoria" concert on the Vajont dam, all enriched by a photographic dossier of sixteen full-color pages in collectible vinyl format signed by Gianluca Moro.

On Friday 25 April 2014, Anzovino was awarded the Premio San Marco 2014 prize in the Room of the Municipal Council of Pordenone, the highest honor that the city assigns by the hands of the Mayor, on the advice of the prestigious Academy of San Marco and the Propordenone association, "to those citizens who excelled so much in the various fields of human activity (arts, humanities, sciences, business, sports, social commitment) as to give prominence to the name of the city and can be offered as an example, particularly for the younger ones". The motivation: "Composer and pianist, born in 1976, despite his young age he has already demonstrated considerable talent with excellent results in national and international contexts, where he was appreciated for its artistic and human qualities. He composed the music for silent film masterpieces and important plays. Its prestigious concerts have enjoyed considerable success – just remember, among all, the one of 2013 at the Vajont dam in the 50th anniversary of the tragedy. He's an extraordinary musician, a master of emotional description, of the same magic of Rota and Morricone. Although more and more successes often lead him out of his city, it remains strongly attached to his land, which he maintains a strong emotional bond with." He was nominated Academician by "Accademia San Marco", which includes the most prominent citizens in the history of the city such as Lino Zanussi, Aldo Savio, Armando Cimolai and other praiseworthy ones.

Anzovino usually gives concerts in special schedules and natural areas. Among others, the list includes the concerts held at dawn on the beach in Cesenatico (15 August 2010), in the reserve of Torre Guaceto (Brindisi) (24 August 2012) and in Pordenone, in the nearbies of the river Noncello, symbolic place of the city (12 July 2014), and the concert at high altitude at about 2,000 meters in Sella Nevea (10 August 2014) for the "No Borders Music Festival", the awakening concert at 7:30 am in Piazza San Giacomo, Udine (4 July 2015), in Vicenza in the consecrated temple of Santa Corona (4 October 2015) (and in the evening of the same day at Ragusa in Piazza della Repubblica), the recital in the function room of the Grand Hotel of Rimini, iconic place of Fellinian imagery, on 20 December 2015.

In an interview given on the occasion of the concert at dawn on the Noncello in Pordenone, he declared: "Dawn is the time at which something is born and something dies, it is the closest time to the soul. I really like to be the soundtrack of that time." The concert marked the artistic history of Pordenone and ranked among the dawn music events with more participation, establishing – as evidenced by Ernesto Assante, music journalist for the newspaper "La Repubblica" – "almost a record. I difficultly recall so many people for a sunrise concert". The newspaper of the Friuli Venezia Giulia, "Il Messaggero Veneto", asked Remo Anzovino to write an editor's review of the construction of the dawn concert, published on the front page on 14 July 2014 with the title "Sinfonia di una Città".

He participated in the tribute album to Cesária Évora and Cape Verdean music with a piano and voice duet with Gino Paoli of "Santo me", the Italian version of "Sao Tomè no Equador", also as producer and arranger. The album Capo Verde Terra d'amore in Jazz was published as an attachment to the historic magazine Musica Jazz in May 2014, and was attended among others by Stefano Bollani, Ornella Vanoni with Teofilo Chantre, Paolo Fresu, Fabrizio Bosso, Enrico Pieranunzi, and Antonella Ruggiero.

Anzovino participated in the tribute album to Lelio Luttazzi with a personal and melodic piano solo version (which he played with his own piano) of "Buonanotte Rossana", which he had already performed at the opening of the exhibition "LelioSwing 50 anni di storia italiana" at Mercati di Traiano in Rome. The album was published also in this case as an attachment to the historic magazine Musica Jazz in December 2014, with the participation among others of Mina, Lucio Dalla, Fabio Concato, Stefano Bollani, Franco D'Andrea, Danilo Rea and Rita Marcotulli, and Enrico Intra.

On the occasion of the 40th anniversary of the death of Pier Paolo Pasolini, Anzovino undertook the project "L'Alba dei Tram", which gives birth to a theatrical work, a single, an album and a film score: on 25 October 2015, in the Pier Paolo Pasolini theater of Casarsa della Delizia, it took place "Recital in honor of Pasolini" with Lino Capolicchio (narrator), Mauro Ermanno Giovanardi (vocals), Danilo Rossi (viola), Marco Anzovino (guitar and percussion), and Remo Anzovino (piano). The show, included in the official program of the Ministry of Culture "Pasolini40", received at its first representation a moving standing ovation and a 10' applause. Lino Capolicchio told that his first meeting with Anzovino "happened quite by chance at the film festival of Fondi, dedicated to Giuseppe De Sanctis: on that occasion I read, with its accompaniment, some poems by Pasolini. I loved his music. And so the idea of this "tribute" – which he wrote some very beautiful, well chosen and poignant pieces for – came to life".

During the premiere of the recital, the song "L'Alba dei Tram" (music by Anzovino and verses of Giuliano Sangiorgi, leader of the Italian band "Negramaro") was performed for the first time. The song, produced by Taketo Gohara and Anzovino, was released as a single on 29 October 2015, supported by an official video signed by Gianluca Moro and Daniel Natoli, which filmed the artists in the room during the recordings at the "Teatro delle Voci" of Treviso. The song is interpreted by the voice of Mauro Ermanno Giovanardi, the solo violist Danilo Rossi (principal violoist, Orchestra of Teatro La Scala, Milan) and the Italian String Orchestra, founded by Mario Brunello and directed by Maestro Stefano Nanni (who edited also the orchestral arrangement).[32]

On 2 November 2015, the 40th anniversary of Pasolini's death, the RAI news "TG1", in the main edition at 8 pm, launched the song "L'Alba dei Tram" with a report by the journalist Vincenzo Mollica, in which he re-edited the official video of the song interpolating RAI stock images of Pasolini in Sabaudia in the short documentary "Pasolini e ... la forma della città" (broadcast on 7 April 1974). On the same evening, the TV channel Sky Arte programmed in prime time, for its first broadcast, the docu-movie "Pasolini Maestro Corsaro" (produced by La Repubblica/Sky Arte and 3D Produzioni, directed by Emanuela Audisio, speaker Fabrizio Gifuni, with Martin Scorsese, Dacia Maraini, Paolo Paoli, Dante Ferretti, Ninetto Davoli, Dino Pedriali and many others), with Anzovino's signature for the whole soundtrack.

On 6 November 2015, the album L'Alba dei Tram – Dedicato a Pasolini was released in CD format: it contains the song, its instrumental version (entitled Inilosap – the poet's name written backward), and all the music used by Emanuela Audisio for the soundtrack of the documentary film Pasolini Maestro Corsaro. The cover of the single/album disc "L'Alba dei Tram" is a photo shoot by Dino Pedriali, dating back to the last days of Pier Paolo Pasolini's life, and belonging to the serie (required by Pasolini himself to Pedriali) commissioned for illustrating his novel Petrolio, published only posthumously in 1992. The photograph shows Pasolini at dawn in his last home in Torre di Chia. The internal notes of the disc were edited by the journalists Tommaso Cerno, Jonathan Giustini, Angela Felice and by Anzovino himself, explaining: "The music of "L'Alba dei Tram" began to grow inside of me two years ago, after a visit by night to the Idroscalo of Ostia, where Pasolini was murdered... The music was born after many months and called Inilosap, thinking about the name of the poet backward, as if rewinding the film of his intellectual and human story the movie could remain even more intact every time... The viscerally popular side of Pasolini has always struck me... So I felt it would be great if the music had become a song and if the author of the verses were my age, somebody whowas born – like me – after his death... I played to music to Giuliano, who decided to give me such beautiful verses... This little work of mine has no claim to be exhaustive nor even to explain Pasolini... This disc is just a set of images, which I hope will come from the sounds to stimulate to reread (or – for the youngest – to discover for the first time) pages and universal images fulloof disruptive force, even today, and perhaps even today indispensable".

The album "L'Alba dei Tram – Dedicato a Pasolini" entered for two consecutive weeks in the FIMI ranking of best-selling albums in Italy, reaching #56 position.

On 25 February 2016, Emanuela Audisio's docu-movie Pasolini maestro corsaro, which Anzovino signed the entirely soundtrack for, received the "Nastro d'Argento" special mention. On 15 March 2016 the music portal Rockit inserted the song "L'Alba dei Tram" among the 10 best ever dedicated songs 40 years after the death of Pasolini, together with, among others, Francesco De Gregori (A Pa), Fabrizio De André (Una storia sbagliata), C.S.I. (Irata), Giovanna Marini (Lamento per la morte di Pasolini).

On 11 May 2016 he performed a piano solo in front of 12,000 people at the Arena di Verona in the opening concert for 2Cellos, on the first date of their European tour, receiving a standing ovation and being defined by the Italian magazine Sky Mag "the Van Gogh of the piano 2.0". On 21 May 2016 Anzovino was one of the protagonists of the piano festival "Piano City Music" in Milan, with a concert at sunset in the scenario of the Vertical Forest designed by Stefano Boeri.

On 27 and 28 May 2016 he was chosen by the magazine Il Messaggero Veneto as the only guest artist of the celebrations for the 70 years of the newspaper, performing in two concerts at the Teatro Nuovo Giovanni da Udine, with the participation – in addition to the Director Tommaso Cerno – of journalists Enrico Mentana, Franca Leosini, Myrta Merlino, Lirio Abbate and Emiliano Fittipaldi.

On 8 July 2016 Anzovino was chosen by RAI and Premio Strega as the official composer for the 70th edition of the most prestigious Italian literary prize. The final ceremony is broadcast on national television Rai 3, and Anzovino accompanied with his music the entire evening, both with the actress Paola Pitagora and the conductor Pino Strabioli. Moreover, he sonorized some period films live, and duetted with the singer Chiara Civello in Gino Paoli's song "Senza Fine", captivating the auditors in the auditorium Parco della Musica-Sala Sinopoli and the entire TV audience.

On 12 September 2016 the song "L'Alba dei Tram – Canzone per Pasolini" was chosen by a jury of 210 journalists as a finalist for the Targa Tenco for the category "Best song of the year".

== Discography ==
- Dispari, CNI/Rai Trade, 2006
- Tabù, Egea Music, 2008
- Igloo, Egea Music, 2010
- Viaggiatore Immobile, Egea Music, 2012
- Vivo, Egea Music, 2013
- L'Alba dei Tram – Dedicato a Pasolini, Egea Music, 2015
- Nocturne, Sony Classical, 2018

=== Featuring ===
- Dj Aladin feat. Remo Anzovino, Dargen D'Amico e Roberto Dellera. Mi vuoi bene – Traccia 2. Fili Invisibili (2012 Metatron/Audioglobe) – music, strings and piano arrangement.
- Gino Paoli e Remo Anzovino. Santo me – Traccia 1. Capo Verde terra d'amore vol. 3 (2012 Numar Un/Egea Music) – elaboration of the original music piece "Sao Tomè na Equador" starring Cesária Évora.
- Tre Allegri Ragazzi Morti cd-album Primitivi del dub (2010 La tempesta) – fender rhodes in the song "La rivolta dell'avvocato".

=== Compilation ===
- Chill out-Blue (2007) – La Repubblica – Espresso – "Cammino nella notte" (from "Dispari").
- Chill out–Green (2008) – La Repubblica – Espresso –"Amante" (from "Tabù").
- Capo Verde Terra d'amore in Jazz (2014) – attachment to the monthly magazine "Musica Jazz" / May – "Santo me" duet with Gino Paoli.
- Lelio Swing (2014) – attachment to the monthly magazine "Musica Jazz" / December – "Goodnight Rossana".

=== Sonorizations and soundtracks ===
- Docu-movie "Pasolini Maestro Corsaro" directed by Emanuela Audisio (La Repubblica/SKY Arte – 3D Produzioni), readings by Fabrizio Gifuni. With Martin Scorsese, Dacia Maraini, Paolo Poli, Ninetto Davoli, Dante Ferretti, Nico Naldini, Dino Pedriali.
- Docu-movie "Lei è mio marito" directed by Annamaria Gallone (Kenzi Production), biography of the lawyer Alessandra Gracis.
- Simone Cristicchi – docu-movie "Dall'altra parte del cancello" (2007 – Sony BMG, DVD) – main musical theme "L'immagine ritrovata" from the album "Dispari".
- Short film "Can Can", directed by Matthew Oleotto (Centro Sperimentale di Cinematografia), with Roberto Citran.
- Docu-movie "Il Lupo in calzoncini corti" directed by Lucia Stano/Nadia Delle Vedove (Faro Film and Graffiti Doc).
- Sonorization of the painter Ottavio Sgubin Barboni's exhibition (Rome, Stazione Termini, Galleria Nazionale).
- Sonorization of the exhibition "Entrare nella terra" by sculptor Guerino Dirindin (Pordenone, Ex Cerit).

=== Music for silent movies ===
- Metropolis – Fritz Lang
- The Circus – C. Chaplin
- Nosferatu, eine Symphonie des Grauens – F. W. Murnau
- Die Finanzen des Großherzogs – F. W. Murnau
- Sunrise: A Song of Two Humans – F. W. Murnau
- Mussolini visita gli stabilimenti della FIAT – Pittaluga
- Das Cabinet des Dr. Caligari – R. Wiene
- Tagebuch einer Verlorenen – G.W. Pabst
- Beggars of life – of W. Wellman
- Die Büchse der Pandora – G.W. Pabst
- Geheimnisse einer Seele – G.W. Pabst
- The Cameraman – B. Keaton
- The Navigator – B. Keaton
- One week – B. Keaton
- The Cops – B. Keaton
- Nanook of the North: A Story of Life and Love in the Actual Arctic – R.J. Flaherty
- Travelling in arctic – Sakan Palsi
- Das Wachsfigurenkabinett – Leni P. and L. Birinski
- Novy Vavilon – Trauberg
- Os Lobos – Lupi
- Mandrin – Fescaurt
- La Maison du Maltes
- Le voyage dans la lune – G. Melies
- La Glace à trois faces – J. Epstein
- L'uomo meccanico – A. Deed
- Tabu: A Story of the South Seas – F. W. Murnau and R.J. Flaherty

=== Music for the theater ===
- La zapatera prodigiosa – by F. G. Lorca (directed by F. Scaramucci)
- Ревизор (Revizor) – N. V. Gogol (directed by F. Scaramucci)
- La donna volubile – by Carlo Goldoni (directed by C. Pontesilli)
- Облако в штанах. (Тетраптих) – V. V. Majakovskij (directed by F. Scaramucci)
- Il pais de cucagne – by P. Biasatti (directed by F. Merisi)
- Dyonisus – freely adapted from T. Suzuki (directed by F. Merisi)
- Le sette berrette di Gaspare Berretta – (written and directed by F. Scaramucci)
- Storia del gatto che se ne andava per i fatti suoi (written and directed by F. Scaramucci)
- Come Pierino diventò Pierone e incontrò la strega bistrega (written and directed by F. Scaramucci)
- La pulce mingherlina (written and directed by F. Scaramucci)
- Il signor Bonaventura – by S. Tofano (directed by C. Manzon)

=== Music for advertising ===
- Alitalia – institutional and promotional board campaign
- New Holland Fiat – institutional
- Chimento Gioielli – commercial
- Lotto – commercial
- Palazzetti – commercial
- Seleco – institutional
- Electrolux – institutional
- Valcucine – institutional
- A.M.I.U – G.E.A. – institutional
- Euroflex – commercial
- Premek – institutional

== Video ==
- Tabù (2008, produced and directed by Francesco Guazzoni).
- Spasimo (2012, Grapevine Studio production, directed by Sergio Chiara).
- Natural Mind/Teaser 3 (2012, produced and directed by Francesco Guazzoni).
- 9 ottobre 1963 (Suite for Vajont) (2012, written and directed by Francesco Guazzoni, Marco Dioda and Liana Chiarot)
- No Smile (Buster Keaton), (2013, produced and directed by Francesco Guazzoni).
- L'Alba dei Tram – Canzone per Pasolini (2015, direction/photography Gianluca Moro).

== Concerts ==
- "Dispari Tour", 2006–2008 (Line up: piano Remo Anzovino, accordion Gianni Fassetta, acoustic guitar Marco Anzovino. Added elements during some concerts: cello Antonino Puliafito, double-bass Mauro Zavagno).
- "Tabù Tour", 2008–2010 (Line up: piano Remo Anzovino, accordion Gianni Fassetta, acoustic and electric guitar Marco Anzovino.)
- "Igloo Tour", 2010–2012 (Line up: piano Remo Anzovino, accordion Gianni Fassetta, acoustic and electric guitar Marco Anzovino. Guests: tenor sax Francesco Bearzatti, drums Franz Di Ciocco, bass Enzo Pietropaoli, clarinet Gabriele Mirabassi, acoustic guitar Bebo Ferra, flugelhorn Luca Aquino).
- "Viaggiatore Immobile Tour", 2010–2012 (Line up: piano Remo Anzovino, theremin/glockenspiel/bass guitar/sampler/voice Vincenzo Vasi, acoustic guitar and percussion Marco Anzovino, electric guitar Alberto Milani. Added elements during some concerts: strings Edodea Ensemble, violin/theremin/glockenspiel/bass guitar/sampler Valeria Sturba, electric bass Andrea Lombardini).
- "Vivo in Tour", 2014 (Line up: piano Remo Anzovino, theremin/glockenspiel/bass guitar/sampler/voice Vincenzo Vasi, violin/theremin/glockenspiel/bass guitar/sampler Valeria Sturba, acoustic guitar and percussion Marco Anzovino, electric guitar Alberto Milani).

== Collaborations ==
During his career, among many others, he collaborated with Franz Di Cioccio, Giuliano Sangiorgi, Gino Paoli, Oliviero Toscani, Mauro Ermanno Giovanardi, Danilo Rossi, Dino Pedriali, Lino Capolicchio, Enzo Pietropaoli, Tre Allegri Ragazzi Morti, Davide Toffolo, Simone Cristicchi, Taketo Gohara, Paolo Baldini, Vincenzo Vasi, Francesco Bearzatti, Bebo Ferra, Gabriele Mirabassi, Luca Aquino, Tommaso Cerno, Orchestra D'Archi Italiana, Coro Polifonico di Ruda, Luisa Prandina, Giuseppe Ettorre, Giuseppe Cacciola, Alessandro "Asso" Stefana, Fondazione Lelio Luttazzi, Dj Aladyn, Dargen D'Amico, Roberto Dellera, Emanuela Audisio.

== Notes ==
- In November 2003, at the University of Bologna DAMS Faculty (Cinema Studies section) a thesis entitled "La musica nel cinema muto oggi: il commento musicale di Remo Anzovino per il film Diario di una donna perduta di G.W. Pabst" ("Music in silent films today: the Remo Anzovino's musical comment to the film Tagebuch einer Verlorenen by G.W. Pabst") was discussed: it was a work entirely dedicated to the music created by the composer for the masterpiece of German Expressionist cinema and starring Louise Brooks, performed for the first time at Cinema Lumiere in Bologna during the exhibition "Louise Brooks, la ribelle".
- Remo Anzovino graduated at age 24 with full honors in Law with a thesis in criminal law about the customer abetting cases by the defense counsel and an appendix on the cases of collusion in the mafia associative crimes by professionals. He practices as a criminal lawyer.
- The first silent movie he created music for has been "Nanook of the North: A Story of Life and Love in the Actual Arctic" by Flaherty. The music was performed for the first time (piano solo) in December 2002 at the Cineteca di Bologna at Cinema Lumiere, during the exhibition "Il cinema del circolo polare artico".
- The picture on the cover of the first album, Dispari, is a scribble on the mixing notes of Ado Scaife, forerunner of the Italian punk ("The Great Complotto"; "Tampax") and cultural entrepreneur, who has followed the executive production of the disc.
- The photograph on the cover of second album, Tabù, was taken by Gianluca Moro (author of the disc cover of the Italian band Baustelle among others), which was inspired by Francis Bacon's studio.
- The cover and interior illustrations of the album Igloo were created by Davide Toffolo, appreciated Italian cartoonist, as well as leader of the rock band "Tre Allegri Ragazzi Morti", who imagined the musical world of that opera as two bears, others from themselves, watching an ice wreck – like a skyscraper surplus – advancing into thin air, in a polar landscape.
