= Love Is Requited =

2011 single by Elisa

Single by Elisa

from the album Steppin' On Water and Someday This Pain Will Be Useful to You
- Released: 15 November 2011
- Genre: Alternative pop; indie pop; folk
- Length: 3:38
- Label: Sugar; Decca (US only)
- Songwriters: Michele von Buren; Andrea Guerra

Elisa singles chronology
| "Basta così" (2011) | "Love Is Requited" (2011) | "L'anima vola" (2013) |

Elisa U.S. singles chronology
| "Rock Your Soul" (2009) | "Love Is Requited" (2011) | "Ancora qui" (2013) |

Music video
- "Love Is Requited" on YouTube

"Love Is Requited" is a single by Italian singer Elisa. Written by Michele von Buren and Andrea Guerra, the song was featured in the film Someday This Pain Will Be Useful to You. In June 2012, the song won a Nastro d'Argento for Best Original Song and was nominated at the David di Donatello for Best Original Song.

== Composition ==
"Love Is Requited" is Elisa's third single, after "Almeno tu nell'universo" and "Gli ostacoli del cuore", in which the singer-songwriter is only the singer.

== Release and promotion ==
The song was available for the first time on the iTunes Store USA on November 15, 2011, which precedes the arrival of the album Steppin' On Water, which was released on 13 March 2012 in the United States.

== Music video ==
The official music video of the song was directed by Milena Canonero and Loris Lai. The video featured some cameo from the film Someday This Pain Will Be Useful to You.

== Charts ==
Chart performance for "Love Is Requited"
| Chart (2012) | Peak position |
|---|---|
| Italy (FIMI) | 48 |
| Italy (EarOne Airplay) | 18 |
