= Meraviglioso =

Single by Negramaro

from the album San Siro Live
- Language: Italian
- Released: November 24, 2008
- Genre: Pop rock
- Length: 4:01
- Label: Sugar
- Songwriters: Giuliano Sangiorgi; Domenico Modugno; Riccardo Pazzaglia
- Producer: Negramaro

Negramaro singles chronology
"Un passo indietro" (2008)	"Meraviglioso" (2008)	"Sing-hiozzo" (2010)

Music video
- "Meraviglioso" on YouTube

"Meraviglioso" is a song recorded by Italian band Negramaro. It was released on November 24, 2008 through Sugar Music as the lead single from the band first live album San Siro Live. The song is a cover version of Domenico Modugno song with the same name published in 1968. The song reached number one on the Italian singles chart and was included in the soundtrack for Giovanni Veronesi's film Italians.

== Background and release ==
The band covered live Domenico Modugno's song "Meraviglioso" during their concert at San Siro on May 21, 2008. The song was included on the fisrt live album recorded during the concert, San Siro Live. The song was also icluded as the official theme song of Giovanni Veronesi's film Italians. In a interview the band frontman Giuliano Sangiorgi explained how Veronesi persuaded him to cover it:

"I’ve had an incredible working relationship with Giovanni just think that it was he, back in 2008, while I was working on the soundtrack for his film Italians, who pushed me to take on that daunting challenge of covering "Meraviglioso". For him, those were the days of Manual of Love, and for us, of "Estate" and "Nuvole e lenzuola". The one who brought us together was his partner, Valeria Solarino,one of the figures in the film industry who had done the most to bring our album Mentre Tutto Scorre to the big screen and, from there, to our first Nastri d'Argento. We had started seeing each other when, one morning, a few days after our debut at San Siro, I found myself playing in a square in Rome surrounded by a crowd of young people determined to stay up late, just like me. Suddenly, a bouquet of roses was handed to me. I looked up to see who had sent me flowers at 6 a.m., and the vendor gestured toward a figure walking away with his back to us. It was Giovanni himself, and he asked me to record it for his film."

== Commercial performance ==
The song debouted at number 27 on the Fimi's singles charts. It peaked at number one on January 30, 2009, becoming the band first number one song and second top ten since Parlami d'amore in 2007. As of August 6, 2014 the song has been certified triple platinum by Fimi.

== Music video ==
The music video for the song, directed by Giovanni Veronesi, released on March 3, 2009 through the Negrmaro's YouTube channel.

== Charts ==
=== Weekly charts ===
Chart (2008–2009)	Peak position
Italy (FIMI)	1
Italy (EarOne Airplay)	1

=== Year-end charts ===
Chart (2009)	Peak position
Italy (FIMI)	9

== Certifications ==
Region	Certification	Certified units/sales
Italy (FIMI)	3× Platinum	150,000^{‡}
^{‡} Sales+streaming figures based on certification alone.
