= No Hero (song) =

Single by Elisa

from the album On
- Released: January 15, 2016
- Recorded: 2015
- Genre: Pop rock; alternative rock
- Length: 4:13
- Label: Sugar Music
- Songwriters: Elisa, Jud Joseph Friedman, Allan Rich
- Producer: Elisa

Elisa singles chronology
"A modo tuo" (2014)	"No Hero" (2016)	"Love Me Forever" (2016)

Music video
- "No Hero" on YouTube

"No Hero" is a song recorded by Italian singer Elisa, released on January 15, 2016 as the lead single from her ninth studio album, On.

== Background and description ==
After her eighth Italian-language studio album L'anima vola (2013) and the end of the L'Anima Vola Tour, in 2015 Elisa had been the coach and artistic director of the blue team in the talent show Amici di Maria De Filippi.

== Live performances ==
Elisa performed "No Hero" for the first time live as a guest performer at the Sanremo Music Festival 2016 on 12 February 2016.

== Charts ==
Chart (2016)	Peak position
Italy (FIMI)	8
Italy (EarOne Airplay)	2

== Certifications and sales ==
Region	Certification	Certified units/sales
Italy (FIMI)	3× Platinum	150,000^{‡}
^{‡} Sales+streaming figures based on certification alone.
