= Filippo Sugar =

Italian music publishing executive

- Born: 25 November 1971 (age 54); Milan, Italy
- Occupation: CEO of Sugar Music
- Years active: 1997–present
- Mother: Caterina Caselli

Filippo Sugar (born 25 November 1971) is an Italian music publishing executive, and CEO of the family-owned record publisher Sugar Music, which was founded by his grandfather Ladislao. In 2015, he was appointed president of the Italian performance rights society SIAE.

== Life and career ==
The only child of Piero Sugar and Caterina Caselli (a key figure in talent scouting and record production in Italy), in 1997, at just 26 years old, Filippo Sugar became the chief executive officer of the Sugar Group.

In the 2000s, Sugar re-framed the company's profile. First, expanding the two flagship Messaggerie Musicali stores in Milan and Rome and re-fashioning them into multimedia entertainment megastores. Secondly, launching Messaggerie Digitali, the first legal Italian platform for on-line music distribution. Thirdly, venturing into two innovative initiatives in local radio broadcasting: Radio Milano Uno and Radio Roma Uno.

In 2005, Sugar sold Radio Milano Uno and Radio Roma Uno to LifeGate. The following year, he completed a deal to sell its two megastores to the Arnoldo Mondadori retail, retaining ownership of the real estate and the historic Messaggerie Musicali trademark, to focus on recording and music publishing with Sugar Music.

Sugar has diversified Sugar Music's portfolio of businesses through smart, strategic investments, and also by spearheading events in the performing arts space. In September 2011, Sugar spearheaded Andrea Bocelli's One Night in Central Park, a historic concert event attended by over 70,000 people that yielded an album and television special.

In 2012, he acquired the esteemed CAM catalogue, a historic Roman publishing company and world leader in the cinema/soundtrack market. In 2015, he developed the international format for Orchestras with La Dolce Vita: The Music of Italian Cinema which saw its worldwide premiere featuring the New York Philharmonic. He also produced Bocelli's Music for Hope solo special, which aired exclusively on YouTube Easter Sunday 2020 breaking records all over the world.

Sugar has led Sugar Music through a number of signings that include Andrea Bocelli, Negramaro (and its lead singer Giuliano Sangiorgi), Malika Ayane, Raphael Gualazzi, Motta, Madame, Lucio Corsi, Salmo, Willie Peyote, Mannarino, Tiziano Ferro and Cesare Cremonini.

=== SIAE ===
Since 2003, Filippo Sugar has represented the Sugar Group companies within the SIAE organization. He rose to chairman in 2015 leading efforts to create a society with the 100% membership basis controls by authors and publishers and re-launching SIAE through improved optimization and efficiencies by providing further rigor around process and transparency coupled with technological innovation. These directives consolidated copyright laws at both the domestic and European level, in the process, making SIAE competitive with other collection agencies.

During his tenure with SIAE, Sugar also spent time nurturing emerging talent through a variety of special projects, which included Italia Creativa, a study conducted by Ernst & Young, that provides a picture of the economy of cultural and Creative Industry as driving factors of economic growth and development.

He is also an active board member at FEM (the Italian Federation of Music Publishers), PMI (the Italian Association of Independent Music Producers) and IMPF (the Independent Music Publishers Forum).
