= Diari aperti =

Studio album by Elisa
- Released: October 26, 2018
- Recorded: 2017–2018
- Genre: Pop
- Length: 40:04
- Language: Italian
- Label: Universal Music Group
- Producer: Elisa; Andrea Rigonat; Calcutta; Carl Brave; Katoo; Marco Zangirolami; Taketo Gohara

Elisa chronology
Soundtrack '97-'17 (2017)	Diari aperti (2018)	Ritorno al futuro/Back to the Future (2022)

Singles from Diari aperti
- 1. "Quelli che restano" Released: September 14, 2018; 2. "Se piovesse il tuo nome" Released: September 28, 2018; 3. "Anche fragile" Released: January 18, 2019; 4. "Vivere tutte le vite" Released: May 3, 2019; 5. "Tua per sempre" Released: September 13, 2019

Singles from Diari aperti (Segreti svelati)
- 1. "Blu Part II" Released: November 8, 2019; 2. "Soul" Released: December 20, 2019

Diari aperti is the tenth studio album by Italian singer Elisa, released by Universal Music Group on October 26, 2018. The singer's first concept album, it is her second album released entirely in Italian after L'anima vola (2013).

Ranked 10th of the "50 Best Italian Albums of 2010s" by Rolling Stone Italia, in 2019 the project was reissued in a double album, Diari aperti (Segreti svelati), composed of the first disc with Italian songs and the second with the English songs already released on the EP Secret Diaries, alongside new bonus tracks and collaborations with Francesco De Gregori, Carmen Consoli, Rkomi, Carl Brave and Calcutta.

The album debuted at number two on the FIMI Albums Chart and was certified three times platinum in Italy.

== Background ==
After ending her contract with Sugar Music, Elisa signed with Universal Music Group in February 2017. On 12 October 2018 she announced "Diari aperti", her second album entirely in Italian, and an acoustic tour to accompany its release. From March 2019 to May 2019 she embarked on a European tournée to promote the album.

== Composition ==
The idea of the title came about to better explain what it is about: I drew not only from my diaries, even very old ones, to write the songs. [...] But also from writings made recently and around which I built the music. For me it was always the other way around: first the melodies were born, and then those suggested the message. In this case the text, in the form of an intimate diary, was driving it. [...] [Reading the diaries] moved me to find there different bonds and feelings that time has not nicked.

— Elisa on Diari Aperti

The recording project includes eleven tracks in Italian, written and composed by Elisa, with contributions from Davide Petrella, Federica Abbate, Calcutta and Carl Brave, and the vocal participation of Francesco De Gregori. American musician and composer Patrick Warren collaborates for arrangements of the tracks. The singer defined the record project a concept album, in which she reflects about her life, marriage and feelings.

== Singles ==
"Quelli che restano", featuring Francesco De Gregori, was released as the lead single from the album on 14 September 2018. "Se piovesse il tuo nome" was released as the second single on 28 September 2018. The song peaked at number 4 on the Italian Singles Chart and was awarded double platinum from the Federazione Industria Musicale Italiana.

During 2019 she published "Anche fragile" and a new version of "Vivere tutte le vite" featuring rapper Carl Brave and "Tua per sempre" were all released as singles from the album; the first two were certified double platinum in Italy while the third one was certified gold. The track "Promettimi", without being a single, was certified platinum.

The album reissued Diari aperti (Segreti svelati) was promoted by the collaboration "Blu Part II" with Rkomi, as a sequel of "Blu".

== Critics' reception ==
Professional ratings
Review scores
Source	Rating
Rockol	3.5/5 stars

Diari aperti received positive reviews from italian music critics.

Writing for Rockol, Mattia Marzi opined that the album "represents at the same time a way to take stock and open up to news, to reflect on how many pages have been written and on how much there is still to be written", praising the vulnerable side of the singer and her singing versatility in several music genres. Giovanni Ferrari of Billboard Italia, associated the album with the term "truth," emphasizing the fact that "it must not be easy to share, first with yourself and, then, with others, all that you are. Strengths but mostly weaknesses. Fragility. The desire to be understood, loved."

Mattia Barro of Rolling Stone Italia wrote that although the album appears to be "a record in the middle", because in Diari Aperti "one half can perceive a desire to get back into the game" of the singer, while "in some episodes, she decides to break out of the rules" and in others "she does nothing but be the Elisa we know." The journalist identified "a triptych of tracks" that stand out for their "natural freshness": "Tutta un'altra storia" with "its own upbeat rhythm" compared to the sounds of Max Gazzè, "L'estate è già fuori", a "calypso pop, fresh, all in major" song interesting for "the use of the melodic reiteration of the sung" and "Come Fosse Adesso", described by the critic as "a very elegant composition that refers to the splendid work on songwriting carried out by Riccardo Sinigallia." Barro described the song with De Gregori as "the craziest and the most punk," which, with "Promettimi" and "Anche Fragile", turn out to be made with a production that "grants entire attention to the intimacy of these lyrics."

== Track listing ==
Diari aperti – Standard track listing
No.	Title	Lyrics	Music	Producer(s)	Length
1.	"Tutta un'altra storia"	Elisa Toffoli	Toffoli	Toffoli; Andrea Rigonat; Taketo Gohara	3:21
2.	"Se piovesse il tuo nome"	Edoardo D'Erme; Dario Faini	D'Erme; Faini; Vanni Casagrande	Toffoli; Rigonat; Gohara	3:22
3.	"Tua per sempre"	Davide Petrella	Petrella	Toffoli; Rigonat; Gohara; Katoo	3:27
4.	"Anche fragile"	Toffoli	Toffoli	Toffoli; Rigonat; Gohara	3:59
5.	"Promettimi"	Toffoli	Toffoli	Toffoli; Rigonat; Gohara	3:55
6.	"L'amore per te"	Toffoli	Toffoli	Toffoli; Rigonat; Gohara	3:41
7.	"L'estate è già fuori"	Toffoli; Petrella	Toffoli; Petrella	Toffoli; Rigonat; Gohara	3:20
8.	"Con te mi sento così"	Toffoli; Petrella	Toffoli; Petrella; Rigonat	Toffoli; Rigonat; Gohara	3:03
9.	"Vivere tutte le vite"	Toffoli; Federica Abbate; Alfredo Rapetti	Toffoli	Toffoli; Rigonat; Gohara	3:47
10.	"Come fosse adesso"	Toffoli	Toffoli	Toffoli; Rigonat; Gohara	3:44
11.	"Quelli che restano" (featuring Francesco De Gregori)	Toffoli	Toffoli	Toffoli; Rigonat; Gohara	4:25
Total length:					40:04

Diari aperti – Streaming edition bonus tracks
No.	Title	Lyrics	Music	Producer(s)	Length
12.	"Se piovesse il tuo nome" (featuring Calcutta)	D'Erme; Faini	D'Erme; Faini; Casagrande	Toffoli; Calcutta	3:15
13.	"Vivere tutte le vite" (featuring Carl Brave)	Toffoli; Abbate; Rapetti; Carlo Luigi Coraggio; Mattia Castagna	Toffoli	Toffoli; Rigonat; Gohara; Carl Brave	3:41
Total length:					46:06

=== Diari aperti (Segreti svelati) ===
Diari aperti (Segreti svelati) - CD1
No.	Title	Lyrics	Music	Producer(s)	Length
1.	"Tutta un'altra storia"	Toffoli	Toffoli	Toffoli; Rigonat; Gohara	3:22
2.	"Se piovesse il tuo nome" (featuring Calcutta)	D'Erme; Faini	D'Erme; Faini; Casagrande	Toffoli; Rigonat; Gohara	3:14
3.	"Tua per sempre"	Petrella	Petrella	Toffoli; Rigonat; Gohara; Katoo	3:27
4.	"Anche fragile" (featuring Brunori Sas)	Toffoli	Toffoli	Toffoli; Rigonat; Gohara; Brunori Sas	4:26
5.	"Promettimi" (featuring Carmen Consoli)	Toffoli	Toffoli	Toffoli; Rigonat; Gohara	3:53
6.	"L'amore per te"	Toffoli	Toffoli	Toffoli; Rigonat; Gohara	3:41
7.	"L'estate è già fuori"	Toffoli; Petrella	Toffoli; Petrella	Toffoli; Rigonat; Gohara	3:20
8.	"Con te mi sento così"	Toffoli; Petrella	Toffoli; Petrella; Rigonat	Toffoli; Rigonat; Gohara	3:03
9.	"Vivere tutte le vite" (featuring Carl Brave)	Toffoli; Abbate; Rapetti; Coraggio; Castagna	Toffoli	Toffoli; Rigonat; Gogara; Carl Brave	3:41
10.	"Come fosse adesso"	Toffoli	Toffoli	Toffoli; Rigonat; Gohara	3:44
11.	"Quelli che restano" (featuring Francesco De Gregori)	Toffoli	Toffoli	Toffoli; Rigonat; Gohara	4:25
12.	"In piedi"	Toffoli	Toffoli; Gianluca Ballarin	Toffoli	5:04
13.	"Blu Part II" (featuring Rkomi)	Toffoli; Mirko Manuele Martorana; Alessandro Raina	Pablo Miguel Lombroni Capalbo; Paolo Alberto Monachetti	Toffoli; Marco Zangilorami	3:35
14.	"Diari aperti"	Toffoli	Toffoli	Rigonat	3:48
Total length:					52:43

Diari aperti (Segreti svelati) - CD2
No.	Title	Lyrics	Music	Producer(s)	Length
1.	"Soul"	Toffoli	Toffoli; John Shanks	Shanks	4:15
2.	"Thirst (For You Only)"	D'Erme; Faini; Laura Pergolizzi	D'Erme; Faini; Casagrande	Toffoli; Rigonat; Gohara	3:22
3.	"Feeling This Way"	Toffoli	Toffoli; Rigonat	Toffoli	4:03
4.	"You Don't Love Me Like I Do"	Toffoli	Toffoli	Toffoli	2:29
5.	"Don't Do Neverminds"	Toffoli	Toffoli	Toffoli	4:08
6.	"My America"	Toffoli	Toffoli	Toffoli	4:06
7.	"A Parallel World"	Toffoli	Toffoli	Toffoli; Rigonat	3:06
Total length:					25:29

== Commercial success ==
Diari aperti debuted at number two on the FIMI Albums Chart, becoming the artist's thirteenth top ten album on the chart, third number two of her career after Lotus (2003) and Pearl Days (2004). On December 5, 2018, the album was certified as a gold by FIMI, becoming the 34th best-selling album of 2018. On February 29, 2019, the album was certified platinum for selling over 50,000 units.

In 2019, after the release of the reissue Diari aperti (Segreti svelati), the project returned to the top ten of FIMI's chart at number six, becoming the eighteenth best-selling album of the year. In 2020, the album achieved double platinum status, appearing on both the 2020 and 2021 FIMI End-Year Charts. In 2022, it was certified triple platinum with 150,000 units sold.

== Charts ==
=== Weekly charts ===
Weekly chart performance for Diari aperti
Chart (2018)	Peak position
Italian Albums (FIMI)	2
Swiss Albums (Schweizer Hitparade)	53

=== Year-end charts ===
Year-end chart performance for Diari aperti
Chart (2019)	Position
Italian Albums (FIMI)	18
Chart (2020)	Position
Italian Albums (FIMI)	58
Chart (2021)	Position
Italian Albums (FIMI)	97

== Certifications ==
Certifications for Diari aperti
Region	Certification	Certified units/sales
Italy (FIMI)	4× Platinum	200,000^{‡}
^{‡} Sales+streaming figures based on certification alone.
