= Birds (Imagine Dragons song) =

- Remix with Elisa cover

Single by Imagine Dragons featuring Elisa

from the album Origins
- Released: June 20, 2019
- Genre: Pop rock
- Length: 3:39
- Label: Interscope; Kidinakorner
- Songwriters: Dan Reynolds; Wayne Sermon; Ben McKee; Daniel Platzman; Joel Little
- Producer: Joel Little

Imagine Dragons singles chronology
"Bad Liar" (2018)	"Birds" (2019)	"Follow You" and "Cutthroat" (2021)

Elisa singles chronology
"Vivere tutte le vite" (2019)	"Birds" (2019)	"Tua per sempre" (2019)

Music video
- "Birds" (Animated Video) on YouTube "Birds" (Featuring Elisa) on YouTube

"Birds" is a song by American pop rock band Imagine Dragons featuring Italian singer Elisa. The song was released through Interscope and Kidinakorner on June 20, 2019, as the fifth and final single from the deluxe edition of the band's fourth studio album, Origins. The song was sent to Italian radio as the album's fourth and final single on June 21, 2019.

== Background and release ==
The song original solo version of the song was written by Dan Reynolds, Wayne Sermon, Ben McKee, Daniel Platzman, and its producer is Joel Little. On 17 June, 2019 Italian singer-songwriter Elisa announced through her social media that the band asked her to re-record "Birds", while she was working on her single "Vivere tutte le vite" from her tenth studio album Diari aperti.

The song made available on streaming platform and music download on June 20, 2019 and sent to Italian radio the following day as the album final single. The song was published alongside the original solo version.

== Music video ==
An animated music video for the original song was released on July 24, 2019.

== Charts ==
=== Weekly charts ===
Weekly chart performance for "Birds" (solo or featuring Elisa)
Chart (2019)	Peak position
Belgium (Ultratip Bubbling Under Flanders)	1
Belgium (Ultratop 50 Wallonia)	6
Croatia (HRT)	67
France (SNEP)	49
Italy (FIMI)	61
Portugal (AFP)	147
San Marino (SMRRTV Top 50)	15
Slovakia Airplay (ČNS IFPI)	8
Switzerland (Schweizer Hitparade)	30
US Hot Rock & Alternative Songs (Billboard)	27

=== Year-end charts ===
2019 year-end chart performance for "Birds" (solo or featuring Elisa)
Chart (2019)	Position
Belgium (Ultratop Wallonia)	48
France (SNEP)	174

== Certifications ==
Certifications and sales for "Birds" (solo or featuring Elisa)
Region	Certification	Certified units/sales
Brazil (Pro-Música Brasil)	Diamond	160,000^{‡}
France (SNEP)	Platinum	200,000^{‡}
Italy (FIMI)	Platinum	70,000^{‡}
New Zealand (RMNZ)	Gold	15,000^{‡}
Poland (ZPAV)	Platinum	50,000^{‡}
United States (RIAA)	Gold	500,000^{‡}
^{‡} Sales+streaming figures based on certification alone.

== Release history ==
Release dates and formats for "Birds"
Region	Date	Format(s)	Version	Label(s)	Ref.
Various	June 20, 2019	Digital download; streaming	Original	Interscope; Kidinakorner	
Various	June 20, 2019	Digital download; streaming	Collaboration	Interscope; Kidinakorner	
Italy	June 21, 2019	Radio airplay	Collaboration	EMI	
