= Vivere tutte le vite =

Single by Elisa and Carl Brave

from the album Diari aperti
- Released: May 3, 2019
- Genre: Indie pop
- Length: 3:47
- Label: Universal Music Group
- Songwriters: Elisa Toffoli; Carlo Luigi Coraggio; Federica Abbate; Mattia Castagna
- Producers: Elisa; Carl Brave; Andrea Rigonat; Taketo Gohara

Elisa singles chronology
"Blu" (2019)	"Vivere tutte le vite" (2019)	"Birds" (2019)

Carl Brave singles chronology
"Merci" (2019)	"Vivere tutte le vite" (2019)	"Non ci sto" (2019)

"Vivere tutte le vite" (in Italian, "Living all the lives") is a song by Italian singers Elisa and Carl Brave. It was released by Universal Music Group on May 3, 2019 as the fourth single from Elisa's tenth studio album Diari aperti.

== Background and composition ==
The original version of the song, performed by Elisa alone, is featured on the first version of the album. The song, originally co-written with singer-songwriter Federica Abbate, featured the collaboration of Italian rapper Carl Brave in writing and producing. The singer described the song in an interview with Vanity Fair Italia:

"It is my invitation to look for a little more levity: especially on social media, which, I premise, for me is a beautiful and useful medium, but sometimes we tend to show only a facade, to always make ourselves look super strong, super happy. And all just to try to be liked, to get recognition. I sing that "I don't want to live every life, I don't want to see every place in the world, win by force." A bit of a reminder that we are not super heroes and we are not always enough of ourselves. And that therefore we should not be afraid to show our fragile part, our normal, maybe even "boring" part. I would like to invite those who listen to me to pick up a pen, write, rediscover the humanity in ourselves. Machines should help us do things, but always expressing what we are."

== Critics reception ==
Reviewing the Diari aperti. for All Music Italia, Fabio Fiume appreciated the "Jason Mraz-esque guitar that accompanies through to an easygoing aside" of the song, in which there are "vocal overlays and background choruses that are so 60s." In a less positive review, Mattia Barro of Rolling Stone Italia wrote that the song is not among the most innovative tracks on the album as it is "less intriguing for its winking at a somewhat outdated period of Italian indie."

== Music video ==
The official music video for the song was released on 13 June 13 2019 on Elisa official YouTube channel. The video, directed by the duo YouNuts! was filmed in Rome, between the neighborhoods of Trastevere and Garbatella.

== Charts ==
Weekly chart performance for "Vivere tutte le vite"
Chart (2019)	Peak position
Italy (FIMI)	22
Italy (EarOne Airplay)	2
San Marino (SMRRTV Top 50)	28

Year-end chart performance for "Vivere tutte le vite"
Chart (2019)	Peak position
Italy (FIMI)	60

== Certifications ==
Region	Certification	Certified units/sales
Italy (FIMI)	2× Platinum	140,000^{‡}
^{‡} Sales+streaming figures based on certification alone.
