= Basta così =

Single by Negramaro featuring Elisa

from the album Casa 69
- Language: Italian
- Released: 15 April 2011
- Genre: Pop rock
- Length: 5:59
- Label: Sugar
- Songwriter: Giuliano Sangiorgi
- Producer: David Bottrill

Negramaro singles chronology
"Voglio molto di più" (2011)	"Basta così" (2011)	"Io non lascio traccia" (2011)

Elisa singles chronology
"Sometime Ago" (2011)	"Basta così" (2011)	"Love Is Requited" (2011)

Music video
- "Basta così" on YouTube

"Basta così" is a song recorded by Italian band Negramaro, released on 15 April 2011 through Sugar Musi as the second single from the band's fourth studio album Casa 69. The single features guest vocals by Italian singer and songwriter Elisa.

== Background and composition ==
The first collaboration between Negramaro's frontman Giuliano Sangiorgi and Elisa was for her single "Ti vorrei sollevare", published in 2009 as the lead single from her album Heart. Sangiorgi than write and composed the song "Basta così", with production by David Bottrill and arrangiaments by Mauro Pagani. Sangiorgi told about the recording process: "[Elisa] came to Bologna to us for a whole day to record the song, we had a great time and we love her very much".

== Reception ==
Reviewing the album, Rockol dwelt on the track, writing that Elisa and Sangiorgi's voices "breathe in the clean air of freedom and yearn for a union of soul and thought", appreciating the use of string instruments.

== Music video ==
The music video for the song, directed by Paolo Marchione, released on March 24, 2023 through the Negrmaro's YouTube channel. The video featured two Italian actors Alessandro Borghi and Nausicaa Benedettini.

== Charts ==
Weekly chart performance for "Basta così"
Chart (2010–2011)	Peak position
Italy (FIMI)	7
Italy (EarOne Airplay)	23

Annual chart rankings for "Basta così"
Chart (2011)	Rank
Italy (Musica e dischi)	86

== Certifications ==
Certifications and sales for "Basta così"
Region	Certification	Certified units/sales
Italy (FIMI)	Platinum	30,000^{*}
^{*} Sales figures based on certification alone.
