= Tua per sempre =

Single by Elisa

from the album Diari aperti
- Released: September 13, 2019
- Genre: Pop
- Length: 4:00
- Label: Universal
- Songwriter: Davide Petrella
- Composer: Elisa
- Producers: Elisa Toffoli; Andrea Rigonat; Taketo Gohara

Elisa singles chronology
"Birds" (2019)	"Tua per sempre" (2019)	"Blu Part II" (2019)

"Tua per sempre" is a song by Italian singer Elisa, released through Universal on September 23, 2019, as the fifith single from her tenth studio album Diari aperti.

== Composition ==
The song, written by Davide Petrella and arranged by Elisa, with Andrea Rigonat and Taketo Gohara, is based on a letter from the 1940s sent by a woman to her partner who had been enlisted in the Second World War. Elisa explained the meaning of the song and her decision to perform it:

"Petrella was inspired by a letter from a wife to her soldier husband, written during the war in the 1940s. This album is full of true stories, and this is another page from those open diaries that are not only mine, but also contain the feelings and emotions of many lives, lived in different times but with the same values."

== Critics reception ==
Reviewing the album Diari aperti, Fabio Fiume of All Music Italia describes the song as a "ballad that thrives on the contrast between the strong beat and the choice to interpret it in soft falsetto in the verses", which are "often doubled vocally", with a "full, melodious and even pretentious interlude".

== Music video ==
The music video, directed by the duo Attilio Cusani, was released to coincide with the single's release on 13 September 2019.

== Charts ==
Chart (2019)	Peak position
Italy (FIMI)	88
Italy (EarOne Airplay)	4

== Certifications ==
Region	Certification	Certified units/sales
Italy (FIMI)	Gold	25,000^{‡}
^{‡} Sales+streaming figures based on certification alone.
