= Italians (film) =

- Directed by: Giovanni Veronesi
- Written by: Giovanni Veronesi; Andrea Agnello; Ugo Chiti
- Produced by: Aurelio De Laurentiis
- Starring: Carlo Verdone; Sergio Castellitto; Riccardo Scamarcio; Kseniya Rappoport; Dario Bandiera
- Cinematography: Tani Canevari
- Music by: Paolo Buonvino
- Distributed by: Filmauro
- Release date: 2009
- Running time: 109 min
- Country: Italy
- Language: Italian
- Box office: €12,159,598

Italians is a 2009 Italian comedy film written and directed by Giovanni Veronesi. For this film Paolo Buonvino won the Silver Ribbon for best score. the film also received three nominations at David di Donatello for best score, best sound and best special effects.

== Plot ==
First segment: Fortunato is a trucker specialized in the transport of luxury vehicles, especially Ferrari, in Saudi Arabia and in other Gulf countries. Tired of a life away from home and in the process of retiring, he accompanies his successor, the young Marcello, for his last trip in Dubai.

Second segment: Giulio Cesare Carminati, a successful Roman dentist, is forced to travel to St. Petersburg for a medical conference that he had organized but which would not want to participate because of the depression in which he fell since his wife's premature death. There he comes into contact with Vito Calzone, an exuberant Sicilian who lives in the Russian city and organizes meetings with local escorts on behalf of the Italian tourists.

== Cast ==
- Carlo Verdone as Giulio Cesare Carminati
- Sergio Castellitto as Fortunato Polidori
- Riccardo Scamarcio as Marcello Polidori / Walter Lo Russo
- Ksenia Rappoport as Vera
- Dario Bandiera as Vito Calzone
- Valeria Solarino as Haifa
- Remo Girone as Roviglione
- Elena Presti as Roviglione's wife
- John Graham Harper as Mr. Vandenheim
- Polina Sidikhina as Natalia

== Soundtrack ==
The film's soundtrack was arranged by Paolo Buonvino. The soundtrack album, produced by Sugar Music, includes 28 tracks, among "Meraviglioso", cover Domenico Modugno's song with the same name by Italian band Negramaro.

== Reception ==
The film was the third highest grossing Italian film of the year, and eighth overall with a gross of over €12 million.
