= The Fifth Wheel (2013 film) =

- Theatrical release poster
- Directed by: Giovanni Veronesi
- Written by: Giovanni Veronesi; Filippo Bologna; Ugo Chiti; Ernesto Fioretti
- Produced by: Domenico Procacci
- Starring: Elio Germano; Alessandra Mastronardi; Ricky Memphis
- Cinematography: Fabio Cianchetti
- Edited by: Patrizio Marone
- Music by: Elisa
- Production companies: Warner Bros. Entertainment Italia; Fandango; OGI Film
- Distributed by: Warner Bros. Pictures
- Release date: 14 November 2013
- Running time: 113 minutes
- Country: Italy
- Language: Italian

The Fifth Wheel (Italian: L'ultima ruota del carro) is a 2013 Italian comedy-drama film directed by Giovanni Veronesi. It was the opening film at the 2013 Rome Film Festival.

== Cast ==
- Elio Germano as Ernesto
- Alessandra Mastronardi as Angela
- Ricky Memphis as Giacinto
- Sergio Rubini as Fabrizio Del Monte
- Virginia Raffaele as Mara
- Alessandro Haber as il Maestro
- Ubaldo Pantani as Toscano
- Francesca Antonelli as Agnese
- Maurizio Battista as zio Alberto
- Francesca D'Aloja as Donna Giulia
- Massimo Wertmüller as padre di Ernesto
- Elena Di Cioccio as Giuliana
- Luis Molteni as Cocco
- Dalila Di Lazzaro as signora veneta

== Music ==
The score was written and composed by Italian singer-songwriter Elisa. The original song "Ecco che" was published on 22 November 2013, and was written by Giuliano Sangiorgi and produced by Elisa. In 2014 the song was nominated at the Nastro d'Argento for Best Original Song.
