= Ancora qui =

Single by Elisa

from the album Django Unchained and L'anima vola
- Language: Italian
- Released: 4 January 2013
- Recorded: 2012
- Genre: Pop
- Length: 5:08
- Label: Sugar
- Composer: Ennio Morricone
- Lyricist: Elisa Toffoli
- Producers: Toffoli; Morricone

Elisa singles chronology
"Love Is Requited" (2012)	"Ancora qui" (2013)	"L'anima vola" (2013)

"Ancora qui" (lit. 'Still here') is a song recorded by Italian singer Elisa. The song was released on 4 January 2013 as the second single from the soundtrack album of the Quentin Tarantino's 2012 film Django Unchained. The song was written by Elisa herself and composed by Ennio Morricone. It was shortlisted at the 85th Academy Awards for Best Original Song. Another version of the song was later included in Elisa's studio album L'anima vola.

== Background and composition ==
Elisa reported that she was contacted by Morricone through her label, Sugar Music. They met at Morricone house where the conductor played her some melodies written for her. For the writing process, Morricone suggested Elisa to be inspired by her memories and so she wrote the lyrics thinking about one of her childhood friends that died of leukemia. The song also sampled the piano composition "Für Elise" by Ludwig van Beethoven.

The first demo of the song was sent by Morricone to Tarantino, who decided to include that version in the film's soundtrack, but without telling the artists in which scene it would be included. Morricone and Elisa worked on a new version of "Ancora qui" with more elaborated arrangements and orchestration, which was not considered for the soundtrack. The second version was included as a track on the singer's studio album L'anima vola.

During a guest lecture at the LUISS University of Rome, Morricone described the work on the song composition, and his criticism on Tarantino's decision to use the demo and not the final version of the song:

"I simply composed a song for Elisa, especially for her. And it came to me thinking of Beethoven's "Für Elise", of which there is a reference at the beginning and the end, then I wrote it freely. [...] [Tarantino] used a bad arrangement for the film. He chose the Sugar demo with only piano, without sensitivity and respect. I have often said that I would never want to work with him, he chooses the music without consistency, and I can't do anything with someone like that."

== Critics reception ==
Reviewing the soundtrack album, Lindsay Zoladz of Pitchfork described the song as a " forlorn classical guitar ballad" praising the "muted melodrama" voice of Elisa. James Lachno of The Daily Telegraph stated that the song is one of the "album's highlight" with "Freedom" by Elayna Boynton, appreciating the "loping, sombre" atmosphere "delivered in elegant Italian" by the singer.

== Charts ==
Chart performance for "Ancora qui"
Chart (2013)	Peak position
Italy (FIMI)	41
Italy (EarOne Airplay)	111

== Release history ==
"Ancora qui" release history
Region	Date	Format	Label	Ref.
Italy	January 4, 2013	Radio airplay	Sugar	
