= On (Elisa album) =

Studio album by Elisa
- Released: March 25, 2016
- Recorded: 2015
- Genre: Pop
- Length: 48:58
- Language: English; Italian
- Label: Sugar
- Producer: Elisa; Curt Schneider; Andrea Rigonat; Christian Rigano; Michele Canova Iorfida

Elisa chronology
L'anima vola (2013)	On (2016)	Soundtrack '97-'17 (2017)

Singles from On
- 1. "No Hero" Released: January 15, 2016; 2. "Love Me Forever" Released: May 13, 2016; 3. "Bruciare per te" Released: August 26, 2016

On is the ninth studio album by Italian singer Elisa, released on March 25, 2016 by Sugar Music. It was produced by Elisa and features collaborations with Jack Savoretti, Emma Marrone and Giuliano Sangiorgi.

It debuted at number one on the FIMI Albums Chart, becoming the singer's fourth album to top the chart. The album was promoted by three singles, including "No Hero".

== Background and composition ==
The album marks Elisa's return to writing songs in English, following her 2013 all-Italian album L'anima vola. The project features thirteen tracks, including a duet with British singer Jack Savoretti and two Italian-language tracks, "Bruciare per te" and the collaboration "Sorrido già" with Emma Marrone and Giuliano Sangiorgi. Elisa explained the title of the project and the concept behind the album:

On can be summed up with two adjectives: vital and energetic. [...] For each record project I tend to change direction, I like it and I need it to renew myself, always. I wanted to make music that could convey the strong charge I felt when I was writing. [...] I went along with these impulses because I realised it was the truest thing I could do and that is always my main goal. [...] It is not an intimate record. Rather, it is a disruptive and very physical record that could only be called that for me, because the effect it has on me is exactly that of feeling switched on and connected

Elisa has cited artists such as Daft Punk, Clean Bandit, The Weeknd, Diplo and Skrillex as inspiring artists for her, producing tracks sounding close to pop and electropop. In an interview with the newspaper Il Giorno, she explained this desire:

This new experience [being artistic director of Amici di Maria De Filippi] has pushed me to study chart music more than usual and has changed me a bit. I have always been brave in the way I make music, especially in the beginning, but then I was introduced to the world of compromise that is part of 'mainstream' pop. I want to make pop music while retaining my independence and I know it's not an easy challenge today

== Critical reception ==
Professional ratings
Review scores
Source	Rating
All Music Italia	8/10
Rockol	8/10

On received generally positive reviews from Italian critics, appreciating the Elisa's ability to produce and compose new sounds compared to previous productions, along with her vocal and interpretative abilities.

Mattia Marzi of Rockol gave the album a score of 8 out of 10, describing it as "an album light years away from the singer-songwriter's earlier productions; [...] Pop, but it is pop in the best sense of the term: a nice mix in which all the best facets of the music of the last fifty years coexist". Marzi reported that the songs in their execution "then go off in unexpected directions. Not only at the level of sonority, but also at the level of musical structure". However, the journalist emphasised that one cannot speak of an "artistic turning point", but of a "starting point for a new and interesting phase in Elisa's career".

Simone Caprioli, reviewing the album for All Music Italia, was pleasantly impressed by the singer-songwriter, who "interprets pop in its best and most intelligent sense, with personality and class", with songs capable of recreating "a perfect and very enjoyable harmony all in crescendo". Caprioli selected "Love Me Forever" and "Waste Your Time on Me" as the best tracks on the album, while "Sorrido già" as the only track that is not completely fulfilled. Federica Palladini of Elle Italia also reflected on the tracks, describing them as "pills of positivity" and defining the arrangements as "sound explosions", in which she found a message of "an invitation to go forward, to break the mould and not always feel safe following the known path".

In a less enthusiastic review, Michele Monina of Il Fatto Quotidiano, defined On an "unresolved" project due to its production and musical choices, which "are not always pop, and when they are not pop they work well. When they try to be pop they collapse", comparing the artistic decisions to those of Emma Marrone, Adele, Kate Bush and The Kolors. The journalist referred to the two Italian-language tracks as "horrible, cacophonies of sounds and choruses".

== Track listing ==
No.	Title	Lyrics	Music	Length
1.	"Bad Habits"	Elisa · Keeley Osborn Bumford	Elisa	3:44
2.	"Rain over My Head"	Elisa · Bumford	Elisa · Andrea Rigonat · Noochie · Victor Indrizzo · Curtis Russell Schneider	3:58
3.	"Love Me Forever"	Elisa	Elisa	3:16
4.	"Love as a Kinda War"	Elisa · Jud Joseph Friedman · Allan Rich	Elisa	3:29
5.	"Hold On for a Minute"	Elisa · Bumford	Elisa	3:08
6.	"Waste Your Time on Me" (featuring Jack Savoretti)	Jack Savoretti · Sebastian Sternberg · Pedro Vito	Savoretti · Sternberg · Vito	3:07
7.	"With the Hurt"	Elisa · Bumford	Elisa · Rigonat · Noochie · Indrizzo · Schneider	4:24
8.	"Catch the Light"	Elisa	Elisa	3:17
9.	"Peter Pan"	Elisa · Bumford	Elisa	3:19
10.	"No Hero"	Elisa · Friedman · Rich	Elisa	4:15
11.	"Ready Now"	Elisa · Bumford	Elisa	3:55
12.	"Bruciare per te"	Elisa	Elisa	4:56
13.	"Sorrido già" (featuring Emma Marrone and Giuliano Sangiorgi)	Elisa	Elisa	4:11
Total length:				48:58

== Commercial performance ==
On debuted at number one on the FIMI Albums Chart, becoming the singer-songwriter's second consecutive album to achieve this result, following L'anima vola (2013), and becoming her fourth album to top the chart, after Soundtrack '96–'06(2006) and Heart (2009).

== Charts ==
Chart (2016)	Peak position
Italian Albums (FIMI)	1

=== Year-end charts ===
Chart (2016)	Position
Italy (FIMI)	21

== Certifications ==
Region	Certification	Certified units/sales
Italy (FIMI)	Platinum	50,000^{*}
^{*} Sales figures based on certification alone.
