= L'anima vola =

Studio album by Elisa
- Released: October 15, 2013
- Recorded: 2012
- Genre: Pop rock
- Length: 49:16
- Language: Italian
- Label: Sugar Music
- Producer: Elisa

Elisa chronology
Steppin' On Water (2012)	L'anima vola (2013)	On (2016)

Singles from L'anima vola
- 1. "L'anima vola" Released: August 23, 2013; 2. "Ecco che" Released: November 22, 2013; 3. "Un filo di seta negli abissi" Released: January 31, 2014; 4. "Pagina bianca" Released: May 23, 2014; 5. "Maledetto labirinto" Released: September 19, 2014; 6. "A modo tuo" Released: November 7, 2014

L'anima vola is the eighth studio album by Italian singer Elisa, released on October 15, 2013 by Sugar Music. It's the singer's first recording project entirely in Italian. The album won the Premio Lunezia for "musical and literary value".

The album features the soundtracks "Ancora qui" with Ennio Morricone, shortlisted for the Academy Award for Best Original Song, and "Ecco che", nominate at the Nastro d'Argento for Best Original Song.

Commercially it peaked at number one in Italy and was certified double platinum by the Federation of the Italian Music Industry.

== Background and composition ==
L'anima vola is the first album published by Elisa entirely in the Italian language, with the participation in the production and writing of the tracks of Ennio Morricone, Chris Bell, Tiziano Ferro, Luciano Ligabue and Giuliano Sangiorgi. In an interview with La Repubblica, Elisa has explained the artistic decision of writing and producing the project:

"When I threw myself into Italian, I had to abandon my critical spirit: otherwise I would not have been able to produce a free, true thing. Thinking about what the one [Italian] can give and take away from the other [English] castrates me. I just don't think about it, I have projected myself onto another track, I have started another journey. I think there are two 'Elisa' with a different style but not necessarily in contrast. It's just another facet of me. [...] My way of making music is not so direct: I don't think this is such a private record. I could be more narrative, sure, like other songwriters do. I am never explicit, I prefer to be evocative. Too much detail hurts the songs because it dulls the imagination of the listener"

The album features an alternative version of "Ancora qui", composed by Ennio Morricone and written by Elisa herself, soundtrack track for the film Django Unchained directed by Quentin Tarantino, which was shortlisted for the Academy Award for Best Original Song. The other song, composed by Elisa and written by Giuliano Sangiorgi, "Ecco che" was selected as the soundtrack for the film The Fifth Wheel by Giovanni Veronesi, earning a nomination at the Nastro d'Argento for Best Original Song.

== Reception ==
L'anima vola received generally positive reviews from Italian critics, appreciating the depth of the lyrics and the themes addressed by Elisa on the tracks.

Marinella Venegoni of La Stampa described the project as a "difficult record" due to the linguistic change made by the singer, considering the choice "like stepping into mysterious territory, a gesture of artistic maturity". Judging it "enjoyable", the journalist defnited it as a "complex musical and production fabric, but the melodies have an immediate impact; with Elisa's ability then to bring out the rich nuances of her beautiful voice", describing the lyrics as "intimist" and "personal".

Paola De Simone of Rockol gave the project a score of 8 out of 10, describing it as having a "mature and readable" style in which the songs are "narrated with a clear and clean pen, not at all thirsty for easy rhymes, but eager to communicate feelings and moods". De Simone described the singer's vocals "well balanced", allowing her a "talented interpretation, which even knows how to communicate nuances".

== Track listing ==
All lyrics written by Elisa except where noted; all music composed by Elisa except where noted.

No.	Title	Length
1.	"Lontano da qui"	4:21
2.	"Pagina bianca"	3:49
3.	"Un filo di seta negli abissi"	3:37
4.	"L'anima vola"	4:03
5.	"Maledetto labirinto"	5:28
6.	"E scopro cos'è la felicità" (feat. Tiziano Ferro; lyrics: Ferro; music: Noochie, Elisa)	4:43
7.	"A modo tuo" (lyrics and music: Ligabue)	5:20
8.	"Specchio riflesso"	4:08
9.	"Ancora qui" (music: Ennio Morricone)	4:56
10.	"Non fa niente ormai"	4:58
11.	"Ecco che" (lyrics: Giuliano Sangiorgi)	3:53

== Musicians ==
- Elisa – vocals, guitar, acoustic guitar, piano, keyboards, electric guitar, bass, programming
- Andrea Rigonat – guitar, acoustic guitar, electric guitar
- Christian "Noochie" Rigano – keyboards, synth, piano, organ, programming
- Sean Hurley – bass
- Davide Rossi – violin, programming
- Victor Indrizzo – drums, percussions

== Chart performance ==
=== Weekly charts ===
Chart (2013)	Peak position
Italian Albums (FIMI)	1

=== Year-end charts ===
Chart (2013)	Position
Italy (FIMI)	15
Chart (2014)	Position
Italy (FIMI)	25
Chart (2015)	Position
Italy (FIMI)	94

== Certifications ==
Region	Certification	Certified units/sales
Italy (FIMI)	2× Platinum	120,000^{*}
^{*} Sales figures based on certification alone.
