= Blu (Rkomi and Elisa song) =

Single by Rkomi featuring Elisa

from the album Dove gli occhi non arrivano
- Language: Italian
- Released: 8 March 2019
- Recorded: 2019
- Genre: Pop rap
- Length: 2:45.
- Label: Universal Music Italy; Island
- Songwriters: Mirko Manuele Martorana; Elisa Toffoli; Pablo Miguel Lombroni; Paolo Alberto Monachetti
- Producer: Charlie Charles

Rkomi singles chronology
"Non ho mai avuto la mia età" (2018)	"Blu" (2019)	"Visti dall'alto" (2019)

Elisa singles chronology
"Anche fragile" (2019)	"Blu" (2019)	"Vivere tutte le vite" (2019)

Music video
- "Blu" on YouTube

"Blu" is a song recorded by Italian rapper Rkomi featuring Italian singer Elisa. The song was released on 8 March 2019 through Island Records as the lead single from the rapper's second studio album Dove gli occhi non arrivano.

The two artists recorded a sequel song entitled "Blu Part II", which is featured on the 2019 re-release of Elisa's studio album Diari aperti.

== Composition ==
The song was written by Rkimo and Elisa, with music production by Charlie Charles.

== Critic reception ==
Mary Adorno of Cosmopolitain Italia described the song "with pop and melancholic overtones", in which "between cryptic passages there are images that tell of everyday life, the difficulty of being oneself without compromise, and how love is able to merge a world of things into one".

== Charts ==
=== Weekly charts ===
Chart (2019)	Peak position
Italy (FIMI)	9
Italy (EarOne Airplay)	21

=== Year-end charts ===
Chart (2020)	Position
Italy (FIMI)	67

== Certifications ==
Certifications for "Blu"
Region	Certification	Certified units/sales
Italy (FIMI)	2× Platinum	140,000^{‡}
^{‡} Sales+streaming figures based on certification alone.
