= Rimani qui =

Single by Andrea Bocelli and Elisa

from the album Duets (30th Anniversary)
- Language: Italian
- Released: 25 October 2024
- Genre: Power ballad
- Length: 3:23
- Label: Decca
- Songwriters: Giovanni Caccamo; Matteo Buzzanca
- Producers: Francesco "Katoo" Catitti; Miklós Lukàcs

Andrea Bocelli singles chronology
"Vivo por Ella" (2024)	"Rimani qui" (2024)	"DNA (More Than a Game)" (2026)

Elisa singles chronology
"Quando nevica" (2023)	"Rimani Qui" (2024)	"Dillo solo al buio" (2024)

Music video
- "Rimani Qui" on YouTube

"Rimani qui" ("Stay Here") is a song recorded by Italian tenor Andrea Bocelli and singer-songwriter Elisa. It was released on 25 October 2024 through Decca Records as the third single from Bocelli's fourth compilation album Duets (30th Anniversary).

== Background ==
On July 15, 17 and 19, 2024 at the Teatro del Silenzio in Lajatico, Tuscany, Bocelli's hometown, three concerts were held to mark the 30th anniversary of Bocelli's career, featuring Italian and international artists singing duets with the artist. For the occasion, the two singers premiered the song.

== Composition and release ==
The song was written by Giovanni Caccamo and arranged by Matteo Buzzanca, with music production by Francesco "Katoo" Catitti and Miklós Lukàcs.

== Music video ==
The official music video, directed by Gaetano Morbioli, was released on 25 October 2024 on Bocelli's official YouTube channel.

== Charts ==
Chart (2024)	Peak position
Italy (EarOne Airplay)	53

== Release history ==
Region	Date	Format(s)	Version(s)	Label(s)	Ref.
Italy	October 25, 2024	Radio airplay	Original	EMI; Capitol	
Various	October 25, 2024	Digital download; streaming	Original	Decca	
