= Duets (30th Anniversary) =

Compilation album by Andrea Bocelli
- Released: 25 October 2024
- Length: 157:00
- Language: English; French; Italian; Spanish
- Label: Decca
- Producer: Andrea Cotromano; Bob Ezrin; Carole Bayer Sager; Celso Valli; Clive Bennett; David Foster; David Torn; Ellis; Filippo Sugar; Francesco "Katoo" Catitti; Frank Peterson; Hans Zimmer; Haydn Bendall; Humberto Gatica; Jeremy Wheatley; Jon Bailey; Kuk Harrell; Mark Taylor; Matthew Sheeran; Mauro Malavasi; Michael Woolcock; Miklós Lukàcs; Mitch Owgang; Nick Cervonaro; Rick Nowels; Robin Smith; Simon Franglen; Steven Mercurio; Timothy Xu; Tony Renis; William Hsieh

Andrea Bocelli chronology
A Family Christmas (2022)	Duets (30th Anniversary) (2024)

Singles from Duets (30th Anniversary)
- 1. "Da Stanotte in Poi (From This Moment On)" Released: 12 July 2024; 2. "Vivo por Ella" Released: 30 August 2024; 3. "Rimani Qui" Released: 25 October 2024

Duets (30th Anniversary) is the fourth compilation album by Italian tenor Andrea Bocelli. It was released on 25 October 2024, to commemorate the 30th anniversary of his career. The album features previously released collaborations from Bocelli's back catalog alongside new collaborations. The album was promoted by three duets: "Da Stanotte in Poi (From This Moment On)" with Shania Twain, "Vivo por Ella" with Karol G and "Rimani Qui" with Italian singer Elisa.

== Background and composition ==
The compilation included previous collaborators include Céline Dion, Giorgia, Laura Pausini, Ed Sheeran, Sarah Brightman, Jennifer Lopez, Ariana Grande, Bono, Kenny G, and others, while new collaborators include Elisa, Karol G, Lauren Daigle, Shania Twain, Gwen Stefani and Chris Stapleton.

== Promotion ==
=== Singles ===
The lead single, a duet version of Shania Twain's song "From This Moment On" titled "Da Stanotte in Poi (From This Moment On)", was released on 12 July 2024 alongside the announcement of the album. Bocelli and Twain performed the song at Andrea Bocelli 30: The Celebration the following week. The second single, an updated version of "Vivo por Ella" featuring Karol G, was released on 30 August 2024.

An updated version of "Canto della Terra" featuring Lauren Daigle, was released on 4 October 2024 as a promotional single. The third single "Rimani Qui" with Italian singer Elisa was published with the album.

The album also includes an updated version of "Time to Say Goodbye" with Matteo Bocelli and Hans Zimmer, which was released on 10 March 2024 as a promotional single following a live performance at the 96th Academy Awards.

=== Tour and concerts ===
On 15, 17 and 19 July 2024 at the Teatro del Silenzio in Lajatico, Tuscany, three special concerts were held to celebrate the 30th anniversary of Bocelli career, featuring Italian and international artists singing duets with the artist.

From 4 November to 22 December, Bocelli will hold a ten-date tour of North America.

== Track listing ==
Disc 1
No.	Title	Writer(s)	Producer(s)	Length
1.	"Time to Say Goodbye" (with Sarah Brightman; from Fly, 1996)	Francesco Sartori; Lucio Quarantotto	Frank Peterson	4:05
2.	"Vivo por Ella" (featuring Karol G)	Gatto Panceri; Mauro Mengali; Valerio Zelli	David Foster; Ellis	4:24
3.	"Quizás, Quizás, Quizás" (with Jennifer Lopez; from Passione, 2013)	Osvaldo Farrés	Foster; Kuk Harrell	3:18
4.	"Fall on Me" (with Matteo Bocelli; from Sì, 2018)	Chad Vaccarino; Ian Axel; Fortunato Zampaglione; Matteo Bocelli	Bob Ezrin	4:19
5.	"Perfect Symphony" (with Ed Sheeran, 2017)	Andrea Bocelli; Ed Sheeran	Matthew Sheeran	4:25
6.	"Da Stanotte in Poi (From This Moment On)" (with Shania Twain)	Mutt Lange; Shania Twain	Rick Nowels	3:57
7.	"Holding On" (featuring Gwen Stefani)	Amy Hartzler; Amy Wadge; Vaccarino; Axel	Nowels	4:03
8.	"Il mare calmo della sera" (featuring Chris Stapleton)	Gian Pietro Felisatti; Gloria Maria Nuti; Malise	Celso Valli; Jeremy Wheatley	4:35
9.	"The Prayer" (with Celine Dion; from These Are Special Times, 1998)	Carole Bayer Sager; Foster	Sager; Foster; Tony Renis	4:27
10.	"La Vie en rose" (with Édith Piaf; from Passione, 2013)	Édith Piaf; Louiguy	Foster	3:07
11.	"E Più Ti Penso (From Once Upon a Time in America)" (with Ariana Grande; from Cinema, 2015)	Ennio Morricone; Mogol; Renis	Foster; Humberto Gatica; Renis	4:28
12.	"If Only" (featuring Dua Lipa; from Sì, 2018)	Sartori; Mauro Malavasi; Quarantotto	Ezrin; Malavasi	3:37
13.	"Somos Novios" (with Christina Aguilera; from Amore, 2006)	Armando Manzanero	Foster; Gatica	4:22
14.	"Return to Love" (with Ellie Goulding; from Sì Forever: The Diamond Edition, 2019)	Vaccarino; Axel; Josh Kear	Ezrin	4:34
15.	"Rimani Qui" (featuring Elisa)	Giovanni Caccamo; Matteo Buzzanca	Francesco "Katoo" Catitti; Miklós Lukàcs	3:23
16.	"Vivo per lei" (with Giorgia; from Bocelli, 1995)	Panceri; Mengali; Zelli	Foster	4:26

Disc 2
No.	Title	Writer(s)	Producer(s)	Length
1.	"Dare to Live (Vivere)" (with Laura Pausini; from The Best of Andrea Bocelli: Vivere, 2007)	Angelo Anastasio; Valli; Eugenio Finardi; G. Trovato	Foster; Jon Bailey; Nick Cervonaro; Simon Franglen	4:19
2.	"Can't Help Falling in Love" (with Katharine McPhee)	George David Weiss; Hugo Peretti; Luigi Creatore	Foster; Gatica	3:22
3.	"Hallelujah" (with Virginia Bocelli; from A Family Christmas, 2022)	Leonard Cohen	Haydn Bendall; Steven Mercurio	4:29
4.	"Amazing Grace" (arr. Mercurio; with Alison Krauss; from Believe, 2020)	William Walker; John Newton	Bendall; Mercurio	3:57
5.	"Moon River (From Breakfast at Tiffany's)" (featuring Sofia Carson)	Henry Mancini; Johnny Mercer	Foster; Gatica; Renis	3:50
6.	"Canto della Terra" (featuring Lauren Daigle)	Sartori; Quarantotto	Malavasi	4:01
7.	"La voce del silenzio" (featuring Marc Anthony)	Amelio Isola	Nowels	4:00
8.	"Canzoni stonate" (featuring Stevie Wonder; from Amore, 2006)	Aldo Donati; Mogol	Foster; Gatica	5:24
9.	"Un Amore Così Grande" (with Veronica Berti, Orchestra Sinfonica di Milano Giuseppe Verdi, and Steven Mercurio; from Incanto, 2008)	Guido Maria Ferilli; Antonella Maggio	Clive Bennett	4:20
10.	"Notte 'e piscatore (Live / 2024 Version)" (with Luciano Pavarotti)	Maurizio Morante	Michael Woolcock	5:05
11.	"Io Ci Sarò" (with Lang Lang; from The Best of Andrea Bocelli: Vivere, 2007)	A. Bocelli; Foster; Finadri; Walter Afanasieff	Foster	4:50
12.	"Pianissimo" (with Cecilia Bartoli; from Believe, 2020)	Malavasi	Bendall; Mercurio	4:28
13.	"Les pêcheurs de perles, Act I: Au fond du temple saint (Live at Central Park)" (with Bryn Terfel, New York Philharmonic, and Alan Gilbert; from Concerto: One Night in Central Park, 2011)	Georges Bizet; Eugène Cormon; Michel Carré	Andrea Cotromano; David Torn; Filippo Sugar; Mitch Owgang	5:56
14.	"Bambina Mia Ricordati" (featuring Virginia Bocelli)	Paolo Marioni	Pierpaolo Guerrini	3:59
15.	"What Child Is This" (featuring Mary J. Blige; from My Christmas, 2009)	Traditional	Foster	4:32
16.	"Time to Say Goodbye" (with Matteo Bocelli and Hans Zimmer)	Sartori; Quarantotto	Hans Zimmer	4:52
17.	"L'Incontro" (with Robin Smith, Cora Arcoboleno, and Lucia Giacon, featuring Bono; from Cieli di Toscana, 2001)	Alessio Bonomo; A. Bocelli; Sartori	Mark Taylor; Robin Smith	4:51
18.	"Mi manchi" (featuring Kenny G; from Amore, 2006)	Fabrizio Berlincioni; Gianfranco Fasano	Foster; Gatica	3:35
19.	"I Believe" (featuring Katherine Jenkins; from My Christmas, 2009)	E. Levi	Foster	4:24
20.	"Corcovado / Quiet Nights of Quiet Stars" (featuring Nelly Furtado; from Passione, 2013)	Antônio Carlos Jobim	Foster	3:34
21.	"Canto della Terra" (featuring A-Lin)	Sartori; Quarantotto	Malavasi; Timothy Xu; William Hsieh	3:59

== Personnel ==
- Creative director: Francisco Negrin
- Broadcast director: Sam Wrench
- Production design: Stufish
- Lighting design: Bruno Poet
- Choreography: Nathan Clarke
- Costume design: Millo Rasia
- Props design: Andrea Faini
- Video design: Luke Halls Studio
- Sound design: Davide Lombardi
- Technical director: Johnny Mac
- Producers: Mercury Studios, Jane Fraser, Jamie Silk, Impact Productions, Citysound

== Charts ==
Chart performance for Duets (30th Anniversary)
Chart (2024–2025)	Peak position
Australian Albums (ARIA)	47
Austrian Albums (Ö3 Austria)	30
Belgian Albums (Ultratop Flanders)	47
Dutch Albums (Album Top 100)	30
German Albums (Offizielle Top 100)	59
Hungarian Physical Albums (MAHASZ)	20
Irish Albums (Official Charts)	46
Italian Albums (FIMI)	51
Polish Albums (ZPAV)	12
Scottish Albums (Official Charts)	7
Swiss Albums (Schweizer Hitparade)	17
UK Albums (Official Charts)	14
US Billboard 200	24

== Certifications ==
Certifications for "Duets (30th Anniversary)"
Region	Certification	Certified units/sales
Brazil (Pro-Música Brasil)	Gold	20,000^{‡}
^{‡} Sales+streaming figures based on certification alone.
