= Blu Part II =

Single by Elisa and Rkomi

from the album Diari aperti (Segreti svelati)
- Language: Italian
- Released: November 8, 2019
- Recorded: 2019
- Genre: Pop rap
- Length: 3:35
- Label: Universal
- Songwriters: Elisa Toffoli; Mirko Manuele Martorana; Alessandro Raina; Paolo Alberto Monachetti
- Producers: Elisa; Marco Zangirolami

Elisa singles chronology
"Tua per sempre" (2019)	"Blu Part II" (2019)	"Soul" (2019)

Rkomi singles chronology
"Oblò" (2019)	"Blu Part II" (2019)	"Vento sulla luna" (2019)

Music video
- "Blu Part II" on YouTube

"Blu Part II" is a song recorded by Italian singer Elisa and Italian rapper Rkomi, released on November 8, 2019, through Universal Music Italia as the lead single from the reissue of her tenth studio album Diari aperti (Segreti svelati).

== Composition ==
The title of the track suggests continuity with the previous collaboration, "Blu", between the singer-songwriter and the rapper featured on the latter's album Dove gli occhi non arrivano. The song in indeed echoes the refrain, changing in the rhythms and strophes.

== Charts ==
Chart (2019)	Peak position
Italy (FIMI)	75

== Certifications ==
Certifications for "Blu Part II"
Region	Certification	Certified units/sales
Italy (FIMI)	Gold	35,000^{‡}
^{‡} Sales+streaming figures based on certification alone.
