= L'anima vola (song) =

Single by Elisa

from the album L'anima vola
- Released: August 23, 2013
- Genre: Alternative dance; dance rock
- Length: 4:04
- Label: Sugar Music
- Songwriter: Elisa Toffoli
- Producer: Elisa Toffoli

Elisa singles chronology
"Ancora qui" (2012)	"L'anima vola" (2013)	"Ecco che" (2013)

Music video
- "L'anima vola" on YouTube

"L'anima vola" is a song by Italian singer Elisa, released on August 23, 2013 as the lead single from her eighth studio album of the same name.

== Composition ==
The song, written and produced by Elisa, is dedicated to her husband Andrea Rigonat. The strings, as in the rest of the album, are by Davide Rossi. In an interview with Fanpage.it, the artist explained the meaning of the song:

"In the title track of the whole work I talk about what I would like as a woman. The lyrics tell about what we would also like from a man and about the fact that often we are not looking for complicated things but mostly for being heard and understood. I am glad that so many found themselves in what I sang"

== Music video ==
The official video for the song, shot in July 2013 and directed by Latino Pellegrini and Mauro Simionato, was released on September 15, 2013.

In the video clip throughout the first verse of the song Elisa is framed standing still against a black background, after which she begins to perform some dance steps and simultaneously her body is multiplied with digital effects. The set of the video was the house where Elisa composed the entire album, which was demolished later.

== Commercial performance ==
The song reached No. 1 on the sales chart on the ITunes Store platform within six hours of its release. The song debuted at number two of the Italian Singles Chart, becoming Elisa's fifteenth song to place among the top ten. Only three weeks after its release, "L'anima vola" was certified gold disc by Federazione Industria Musicale Italiana. On June 27, 2014, it received double platinum certification.

== Charts ==
=== Weekly charts ===
Chart (2013)	Peak position
Italy (FIMI)	2
Italy (EarOne Airplay)	2

=== Year-end charts ===
Chart (2013)	Position
Italy (FIMI)	23

== Certifications ==
Region	Certification	Certified units/sales
Italy (FIMI)	2× Platinum	60,000^{‡}
^{‡} Sales+streaming figures based on certification alone.
