= Se piovesse il tuo nome =

Single by Elisa

from the album Diari aperti
- Released: September 28, 2018
- Genre: Indie pop
- Length: 3:20
- Label: Universal Music Group
- Songwriters: Edoardo D'Erme; Vanni Casagrande; Dario Faini
- Producers: Elisa; Andrea Rigonat; Taketo Gohara

Elisa singles chronology
"Quelli che restano" (2018)	"Se piovesse il tuo nome" (2018)	"Anche fragile" (2019)

"Se piovesse il tuo nome" is a song by Italian singer Elisa, released through Universal Music Group on September 28, 2018 as the lead single from her tenth studio album Diari aperti.

It was written by Calcutta, Vanni Casagrande and Dario Faini and produced by Elisa with Andrea Rigonat and Taketo Gohara. On 14 December 2018 it was released a version of the single sung with its author Calcutta.

"Se piovesse il tuo nome" peaked at number 4 on the Italian FIMI Singles Chart and was certified double platinum in Italy. It was praised by Italian music critics and named of the best song of the year.

== Background and composition ==
Elisa explained the song is about an ended relationship which is still present; the singer can't calm down her "thirst for love" in the lyrics. The song "plays between harmony and visionary lyrics, mixing the it-pop approach with the melodies of the best songwriting".

== Critics' reception ==
Paola Gallo from Onde Funky said, "The clear voice of Elisa that molds itself perfectly to the music and makes life lived and clear photographs of everyday stories and feelings flow [...] The feeling is that Elisa really wants to talk about herself again as in an intimate and definitive x-ray." Caterina Civallero and Maria Luisa Rossi from Uno Editori opined that "Se piovesse il tuo nome" was an "exceptional blend: the woman sings, the songwriter elaborates and the singer interprets. It is love to the nth degree, generated and multiplied through the passages that reach us full of phatos and eros, that light and modest eros that moves between veils and cups of water to drink together."

== Commercial performance ==
First debuting at number seven on the FIMI singles chart, the song gained positions week after week reaching the top position on the Italian airplay chart for four consecutive weeks. After almost three months since its publication, the song reached number four on the Singles Chart, during its fifty-first week charting.

== Music video ==
The music video for the song was released on YouTube on 28 February 2018, to accompany the single's publication. Realized in black & white and directed by the duo YouNuts!, the video shows Elisa moving under the rain in several places, directly referring to the song's lyrics.

== Live performances ==
Elisa performed the song live at the Premio Tenco 2018.

== Track listing ==
Digital download
No.	Title	Length
1.	"Se piovesse il tuo nome"	3:20

Digital download
No.	Title	Length
1.	"Se piovesse il tuo nome (with Calcutta)"	3:20

== Charts ==
=== Weekly charts ===
Chart performance for "Se piovesse il tuo nome"
Chart (2018)	Peak position
Italy (FIMI)	4
Italy Airplay (EarOne)	1

=== Year-end charts ===
Chart (2018)	Position
Italy (FIMI)	65

== Certifications ==
Region	Certification	Certified units/sales
Italy (FIMI)	4× Platinum	400,000^{‡}
^{‡} Sales+streaming figures based on certification alone.
