= Dario Baldi =

Italian film director

- Born: September 18, 1976 (age 49); Rome, Italy
- Occupations: Film director, writer
- Years active: 2005–present
- Website: www.dariobaldi.com

Dario Baldi (born September 18, 1976) is an Italian film director, documentarian and writer.

== Biography ==
Dario Baldi grew up in a family devoted to cinema. Marcello, his father, directed over 100 documentaries (such as "Italia K2", about the 1954 conquest of K2) and more than 30 movies (e.g. Saul e David and other movies with a biblical subject). Dario immediately showed a natural attitude toward cinema, the set, and editing, playing in several different roles in movies since he was a child. Starting as editor (working with internationally known directors of both cinema and advertising, such as Robert Altman) he passed to directing music videos and commercials, to documentaries and, finally, to cinema.

Among the most relevant documentary activities was Managers, written and directed by Dario in 1998 using a small camera, which showed Roman homeless people's lives. Dario also wrote and directed several short films that were awarded at European festivals. He also directed the movie "Pablo", about Pablo Neruda's life, an exercise of improvisation, shot in Neruda's places and using non professional actors that he met along his journey following Neruda's footsteps. As a result, the movie is a cinematographic opera in which common people such as a waiter, a fisherman's son and others. While innovative and unique in its kind, Pablo is immediately welcomed with benevolence and, in a short lapse of time, the movie is presented at Montreal Festival, Los Angeles AFI Film Festival and in several other international exhibitions where it gets positive acknowledgments from the public and good reviews from Variety and The New York Times. In 2008, "Pablo" was broadcast on some European channels, such as Swedish national television.

After a period in the US, where he worked on the 2 fast 2 furious advertising campaign, Baldi moved to England where he lived and worked as a director for five years for Universal Music, BBC, Channel 4 and Turner, ranging from advertising to movies. He also worked in Russia, Thailand, Canada and several European countries, still continuing his cooperation with the above-mentioned subjects.

In 2007, Dario carried on several projects, such as the movie Zero (featuring Dario Fo, Lella Costa and Moni Ovadia) and he worked as co-director (together with Davide Marengo), editor, cameraman, sound editor and art director on the rockumentary Dallaltrapartedellaluna, about the birth and rise of Negramaro. The movie was screened as special event on the " Orizzonti" section on the 64th Venice International Film Festival, and was broadcast on Italia 1 television and then was edited as a DVD. For this band (and also for other musicians) he directs several music videos and in 2008 he is awarded with the Roma Videoclip Award and the second place on the Italian videoclip award.

Together with Marcello, his father, he directed, in 2008, the movie Narciso, dietro i cannoni, davanti ai muli, winner of eight film festivals, among which the RIFF. In 2009 he worked as second unit director for the "Crimini 2" fiction, broadcast by Rai 2 in prime time and, in the meantime, still directs commercials and videoclips for Pepsi, Chrysler, Sony, Universal, Emi and other companies. In the same period he was invited by Marzi gallery for presenting some of his works in Berlin, New York and Rome.

Afterward he wrote some scripts, such as the one concerning the life of Mapplethorpe, the photographer, and the resulting movie was presented by Wim Wenders and started the preparation of two other movies. In 2010 Baldi worked on the movie Gli Anni Verdi, featuring some young actors from Artes school along with actors such as Roberto Herlitzka, Dario Vergassola and Enrico Brignano. In July 2010 he started with the latter, and with Francesco Pannofino, the shooting of the movie Faccio un salto all'Avana, for Medusa Film.

In 2012 he filmed There's always a reason, an Italian-Chinese co-production, starring Maria Grazia Cucinotta and Huang Hai Bo.

== Filmography ==
=== Director ===
==== Cinema ====
- Pablo (2005)
- Dall'altra parte della luna (2007)
- Narciso, dietro i cannoni, davanti ai muli (2008)
- Gli anni verdi (2011)
- Faccio un salto all'Avana (2011)
- There's always a reason (2012)

==== Television ====
- Crimini 2 - second unit director - episodes Little Dream e Neve Sporca (2008–2009)
- Benvenuti a tavola - Nord vs Sud - (2011)

==== Music videos ====
- Negramaro - L'immenso (2007)
- Negramaro - Cade la pioggia (2007)

==== Commercials ====
- Pepsi (2009)
- Rai Movie (2010)
- Johnson & Johnson (2011)

=== Writer ===
- Narciso, dietro i cannoni, davanti ai muli (2008)
- La musica dell'anima
- Una notte per caso
- Frozen mescalina
- Cenere
- Pablo (2005)
- I ragazzi di Città
- The box - short movie
- Click - short movie
