= Ti vorrei sollevare =

Single by Elisa and Giuliano Sangiorgi

from the album Heart
- Language: Italian
- Released: October 16, 2009
- Recorded: 2009 by Davide Linzi, Dave Frazer
- Genre: Pop rock
- Length: 4:32
- Label: Sugar
- Songwriter: Elisa
- Producers: Elisa, Andrea Rigonat

Elisa singles chronology
"Qualcosa che non c'è" (2007)	"Ti vorrei sollevare" (2009)	"Anche se non trovi le parole" (2010)

Giuliano Sangiorgi singles chronology
""Safari" (with Jovanotti)" (2008)	"Ti vorrei sollevare" (2009)	"Sing-hiozzo" (2010)

"Ti vorrei sollevare" is a song by Italian singers Elisa and Giuliano Sangiorgi, released on October 16, 2009 through Sugar Music as the lead single for her sixth studio album Heart.

The song peaked at number one on the Italian Singles Chart, becoming Elisa's sixth and Sangiorgi's first song as a lead artist to achieve it.

== Composition ==
The song was written and composed by Elisa, with the produciotn of her partner Andrea Rigonat. Elisa explained the decision to collaborate with Giuliano Sangiorgi was made because his vocal timbre that perfectly matched the melody of the song. Sangiorgi also expressed his thought about the collaboration:

"In the song we hear two voices that need each other. It is the meeting of instinct and reason, feelings that reflect our personalities and how we approach music"

— Giuliano Sangiorgi about the collaboration with Elisa

In an interview for Vanity Fair Italia, Elisa said she dedicated "Ti vorrei sollevare" to her best friend, to whom she had already dedicated Rainbow.

== Music video ==
The music video for "Ti vorrei sollevare" was directed by the Italian film director Marco Ponti and was produced by One More. It premiered on the Corriere della Sera website on 4 November 2009 and was set in a Mountain's countryside.

== Commercial performance ==
The song reached the #1 on the Italian Chart FIMI for the first two weeks from its release, on Italian Airplay Chart since 15 November 2009 and was certified Platinum Award for the copies sold.

== Credits ==
- Elisa – vocals, keyboards, programming
- Giuliano Sangiorgi – vocals
- Andrea Fontana – drums
- Max Gelsi – bass
- Gianluca Ballarin – keyboards
- Andrea Rigonat – electric guitar and acoustic guitar, programming
- Simone Bertolotti – effects

== Charts ==
=== Weekly charts ===
Chart (2009)	Peak position
Italian Singles (FIMI)	1
Italy (EarOne Airplay)	1

=== Year-end charts ===
Chart (2009)	Position
Italian Singles (FIMI)	20
Chart (2010)	Position
Italian Singles (FIMI)	60

== Certifications ==
Region	Certification	Certified units/sales
Italy (FIMI)	2× Platinum	60,000^{‡}
^{‡} Sales+streaming figures based on certification alone.
