= Negramaro =

Italian rock band

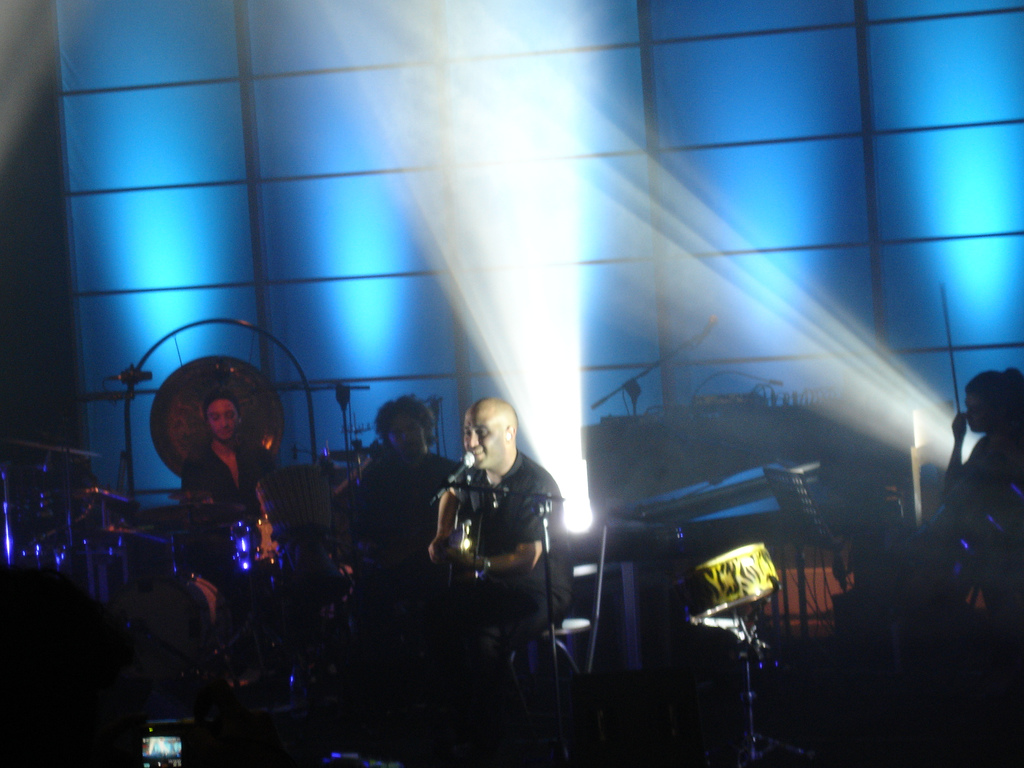
- Negramaro, live in Tione, Trento, Italy

Background information
- Origin: Copertino, Lecce, Italy
- Genres: Rock; pop rock; alternative rock
- Years active: 1999–present
- Label: Sugar
- Members: Giuliano Sangiorgi; Emanuele Spedicato; Ermanno Carlà; Danilo Tasco; Andrea "Andro.i.d." Mariano; Andrea "Pupillo" De Rocco
- Website: www.negramaro.it

Negramaro is an Italian rock band formed in 1999 and successful since 2005. Their name stems from Negroamaro, a wine produced in their native district of Salento in Apulia.

After years spent in the Italian alternative market, they became more widely known in 2005 thanks to their participation in the Sanremo Music Festival 2005 with the song "Mentre tutto scorre". The band published nine studio albums, reaching four time the number one on the Italian Albums Chart, and several successful singles and collaborations, including "Estate", "Nuvole e lenzuola", "Parlami d'amore", "Meraviglioso", "Basta così" and "Diamanti".

Throughout their career they composed two soundtracks albums for the films La febbre directed by Alessandro D'Alatri and Angel of Evil directed by Michele Placido, winning three Nastri d'Argento and being nominated at the David di Donatello. Tha band also won a MTV Europe Music Awards and two Premi Lunezia for songwriting.

== Biography ==
=== Debut and Negramaro ===
Negramaro formed in 1999 in Copertino, near Lecce. In the beginning, helped by live performances, they received good reviews. That improved when they met producer Caterina Caselli, who taught them how to record music.

In 2001 they won the Tim Tour and ended as finalists at the MTV Brand New Talent.

Their first album, Negramaro, was released in 2003. The sound of the album was too alternative for the Italian public, so it did not have much success. Two singles were released. They were minor hits: "Mono" and "Solo".

=== The 000577 Project ===
In 2004, Negramaro met Italian producer Corrado Rustici to work on a few songs. The collaboration between them spawned a brand new track, "Scusa Se Non Piango", and three remixes of previous songs: "Es-Senza", "Evidentemente" and "Come Sempre". The four tracks were added to the other songs from their first album to create 000577, a new edition of their debut work.

This new edition gave the band a more pop-rock feeling, which was more suitable for the Italian public. The 2004 version of "Come Sempre" was released as a single with better success of the previous ones, and was even chosen as the soundtrack to celebrate the 50th birthday of the Italian TV network RAI.

=== Mentre Tutto Scorre: Commercial success ===
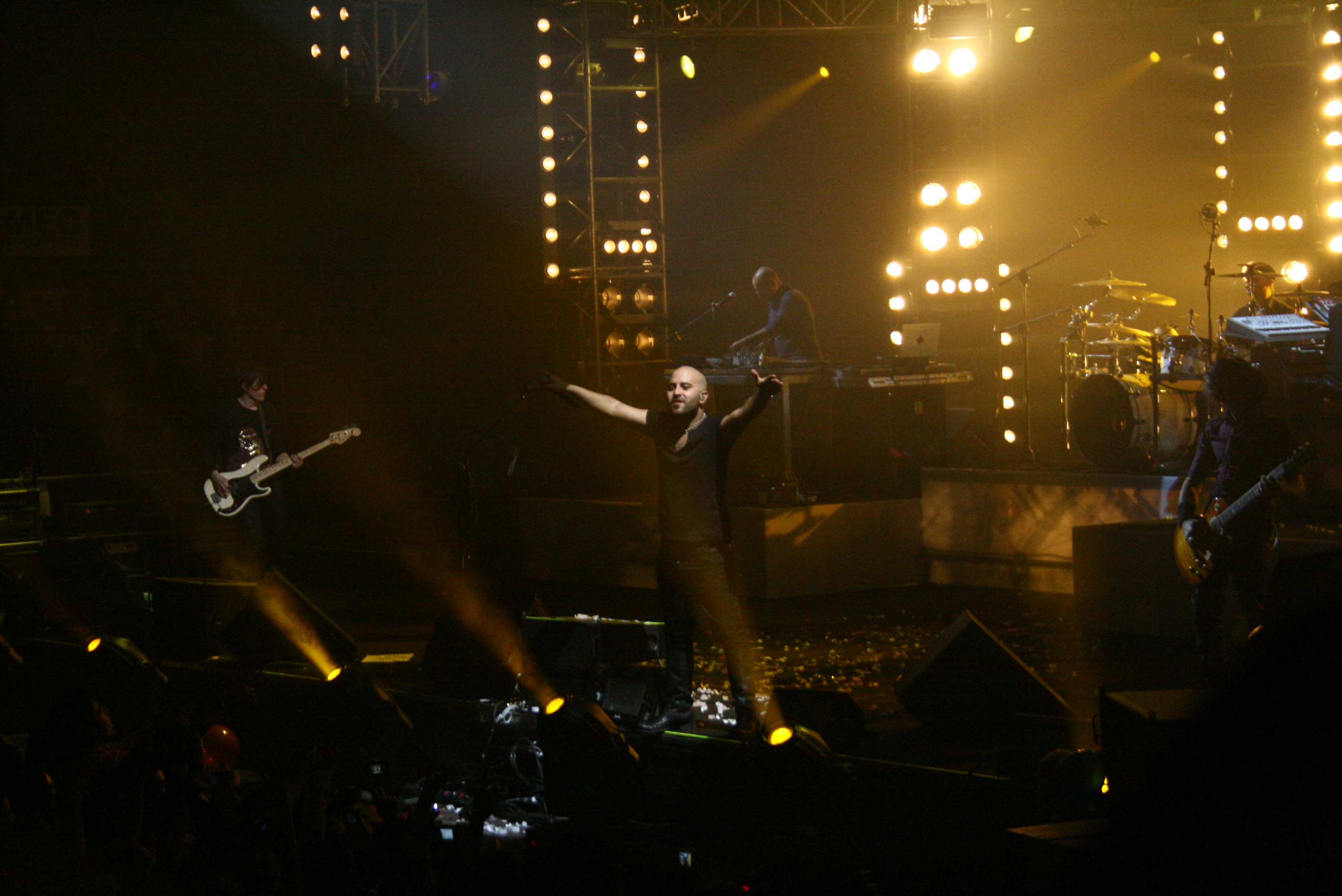
Negramaro in 2008

Negramaro performed the song "Mentre Tutto Scorre" at the Sanremo Music Festival 2005, but were eliminated at the first turn. The song was the first single released from their eponymous second album.

After the festival, eight of their songs were chosen as the soundtrack of the Italian film La Febbre, starring Fabio Volo.

This helped the band to launch their success: despite the Sanremo disappointment, the single "Mentre Tutto Scorre" was a success. The second single, "Estate", was even more successful, giving the band their first No. 1 in the Italian airplay chart. "Solo3min" and "Nuvole e Lenzuola" followed the success of the first two singles.

Thanks to hit singles, good performances and critics, their album Mentre Tutto Scorre gained a lot of success, being certified 6× platinum in Italy.

This album was different from the first one: it was entirely produced by Corrado Rustici, and took the band in a pop rock direction rather than their classic alternative style. Their change gave them success through radio, music marketing and fans.

The album was accompanied by a tour later released on the Negramaro Live DVD in 2006. Their single "Nuvole e Lenzuola" is included in the game Guitar Hero World Tour.

On May 21, 2008 the band performed one concert-event in San Siro Stadium in Milan, from which they live recorded their first live album San Siro Live. The album was promoted by the single "Meraviglioso", a cover version of Domenico Modugno sog with the same name, which peaked at numer one on the Italian Singels Chart. The song also figured as the theme song of Giovanni Veronesi's film Italians.

=== 2010s ===
Their fifth studio album Casa 69 was recorded at Metalworks Studios in Mississauga, Ontario and published on 16 November 2010. It became the band's second album to debut at number one on the Italian Albums Chart, selling over 200,000 units in Italy. The album was promoted by the collaboration "Basta così" with Elisa, which peaked at number seven on the Italian Singles Chart and was certified double platinum by FIMI.

On 21 September 2012 Negramaro published the single "Ti è mai successo?", which anticipated their sixth studio album La rivoluzione sta arrivando, released on 25 September 2015. The album became the band third consecutive number one on the Italian Albums Charts and charted also on the Ultratop Wallonia Albums Chart.

Throughout 2016, the group had split for two months due to some artistic and personal discrepancies between frontman Giuliano Sangiorgi and keyboardist and programmer Andrea Mariano. Sangiorgi move to New York City where he started writing new music inspired by the longing of the group. On 6 October 2017 the group published the single "Fino all'imbrunire", which peaked at number seven on the Italian Singles Chart and was certified double platinum by FIMI. On 17 November 2017 the band published their seventh studio album Amore che torni, which debuted at number one on the Italian Album Charts and was certified double platinum by FIMI in 2018. Through 2018 the band published three singles from the album, "La prima volta", "Amore che torni" and "Per uno come me", all certified platinum by FIMI.

=== 2020s ===
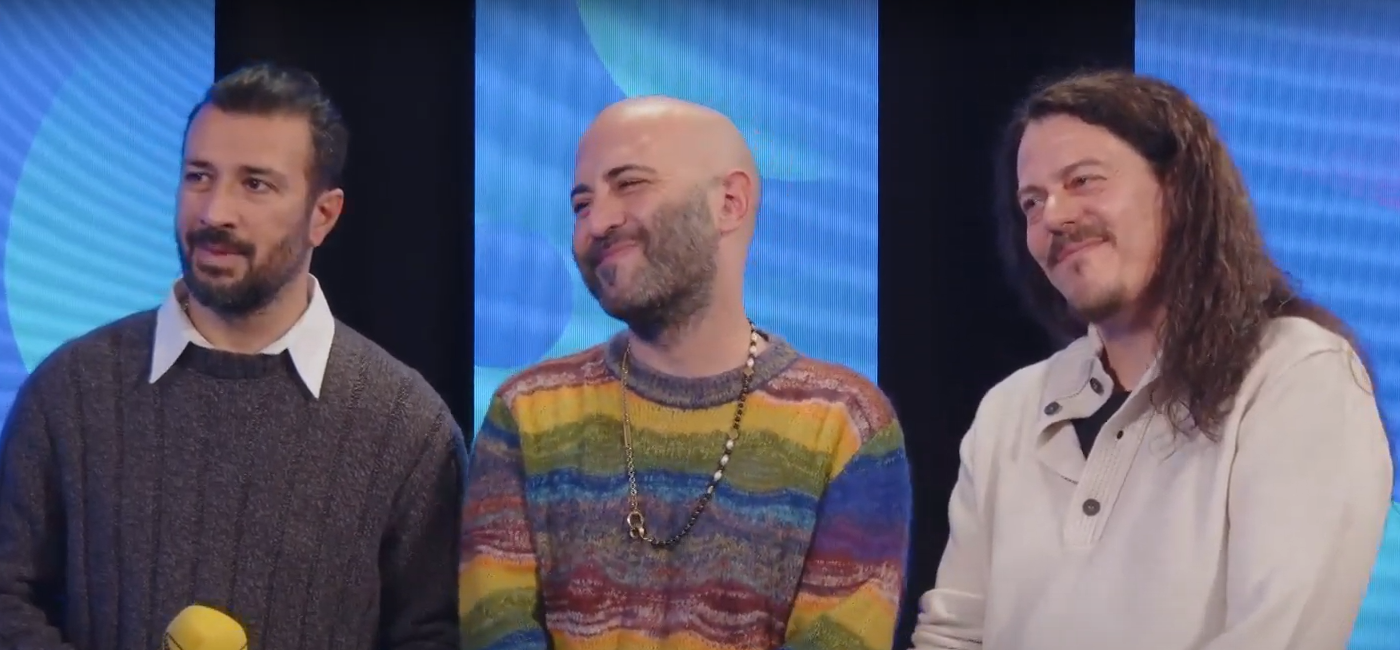
Negramaro in 2024

On 9 October 2020 the band published the single "Contatto", which anticipated the album with the same name published on 13 November 2020. The album peaked at number two on the Italian Album Chart, and was followed by the singles "La cura del tempo" and "Ora ti canto il mare".

In March 2023, the single "Diamanti" was released, in which Negramaro collaborated with Elisa and Jovanotti, which was followed in September 2023 by the collaboration "Fino al giorno nuovo" with Fabri Fibra. They then participated in the Sanremo Music Festival 2024, marking their second participation at the contest, with the song "Ricominciamo tutto", winning the Lunezia Prize for musical-literary value for the song. In the same year they released two more singles: in April "Luna piena" and "Marziani", which anticipated the album Free Love, published on 22 November 2024.

== Members ==
- Giuliano Sangiorgi (Nardò, LE, 24 January 1979) (vocals, guitar and piano)
- Emanuele Spedicato (Nardò, LE, 26 October 1980) (guitar)
- Ermanno Carlà (Veglie, LE, 17 February 1977) (bass)
- Danilo Tasco (Gagliano del Capo, LE, 26 March 1979) (drums)
- Andrea "Andro.i.d." Mariano (Copertino, LE, 26 March 1978) (piano and synthesizer)
- Andrea "Pupillo" De Rocco (Nardò, LE, 30 September 1973) (sampler)

== Discography ==
=== Albums ===
==== Studio albums ====
Title	Album details	Peak chart positions			Certifications
Title	Album details	ITA	BEL (W)	SWI	Certifications
Negramaro	Released: 21 March 2003; Label: Sugar Music; Formats: CD, LP	—	—	—	
000577	Released: 27 July 2004; Label: Sugar Music; Formats: CD, LP	98	—	—	FIMI: Gold
Mentre tutto scorre	Released: 4 March 2005; Label: Sugar Music; Formats: CD, LP, Digital download	3	—	—	FIMI: Diamond
La finestra	Released: 8 June 2007; Label: Sugar Music; Formats: CD, LP, Digital download	1	—	96	FIMI: Diamond
Casa 69	Released: 16 November 2010; Label: Sugar Music; Formats: CD, LP, Digital download	1	—	—	FIMI: 4× Platinum
La rivoluzione sta arrivando	Released: 25 September 2015; Label: Sugar Music; Formats: CD, LP, Digital download, Streaming	1	139	—	FIMI: 2× Platinum
Amore che torni	Released: 17 November 2017; Label: Sugar Music; Formats: CD, LP, Digital download, Streaming	1	—	91	FIMI: 2× Platinum
Contatto	Released: 13 November 2020; Label: Sugar Music; Formats: CD, LP, Digital download, Streaming	2	—	79	FIMI: Gold
Free Love	Released: 22 November 2024; Label: Sugar Music; Formats: CD, LP, Digital download, Streaming	8	—	—	

==== Soundtracks albums ====
- The Fever (Original Soundtrack) (2005)
- Angel of Evil (Original Soundtrack) (2010)

=== Singles ===
Year	Single	Peak positions		Album
Year	Single	Italy	Europe	Album
2003	"Mono"	—	—	Negramaro
2003	"Solo"	—	—	Negramaro
2004	"Come sempre"	—	—	000577
2005	"Mentre tutto scorre"	14	47	Mentre tutto scorre
2005	"Estate"	50	—	Mentre tutto scorre
2005	"Solo tre minuti"	37	—	Mentre tutto scorre
2006	"Nuvole e lenzuola"	10	54	Mentre tutto scorre
2007	"Parlami d'amore"	2	38	La finestra
2007	"L'immenso"	13	137	La finestra
2007	"Senza fiato" (featuring Dolores O'Riordan)	—	—	La finestra
2007	"Cade la pioggia" (featuring Jovanotti)	15	140	La finestra
2008	"Via le mani dagli occhi"	17	42	La finestra
2008	"Un passo indietro"	30	72	La finestra
2008	"Meraviglioso"	1	32	San Siro Live
2010	"Singh-iozzo"	2	—	Casa 69
2011	"Voglio molto di più"	89	—	Casa 69
2011	"Basta così" (with Elisa)	7	49	Casa 69
2017	"Fino all'imbrunire"	7	—	Amore che torni
2017	"La prima volta"	47	—	Amore che torni
2023	"Diamanti" (with Elisa and Jovanotti)	40	—	Free Love
2024	"Ricominciamo tutto"	26	—	Free Love
2024	"Luna piena"	90	—	Free Love

== Filmography ==
- 2007 – Dall'altra parte della luna (documentary, directed by Dario Baldi e Davide Marengo)
- 2019 – L'anima vista da qui (documentary, directed by Gianluca Grandinetti)
