= Taketo Gohara =

Record producer, composer and sound designer of Japanese origin

Taketo Gohara is a record producer, composer and sound designer who has collaborated with numerous Italian artists and composers such as Vinicio Capossela, Brunori Sas, Elisa, Francesco Motta, Biagio Antonacci, Dardust, Remo Anzovino, Mauro Pagani, Vasco Brondi, Banda Osiris, Francesco Cerasi and Cesare Picco along with rock artists - Edda, Pier Paolo Capovilla, Lombroso, Marta Sui Tubi, Ministri, Mokadelic, Negramaro, Verdena, etc.

As a composer he has created various music for art installations for example he made for the inauguration of Miart 2022 in collaboration with the painter Eugenio Tibaldi "Marginal Carillon" strongly desired by the art curator Irina Zucca.

He composes music for ballets, collaborating among others with Stefania Ballone, dancer and choreographer of the Scala in Milan.

He is also active in the advertising field.

In the film industry he specializes as a sound designer and has more than 30 films to his credit as a soundtrack mixer in Surround

In an ambient and contemporary music setting, he has performed live with D. Rad (producer of Almamegretta) and Cesare Picco in various contemporary music and art festivals.

He teaches Sound Design on a permanent basis at the European Institute of Design and at the Centro Professione Musica in Milan[1] as well as holding various Master Classes on the world of sound in academic and working contexts.
