= Giuliano Sangiorgi =

Italian artist (born 1979)

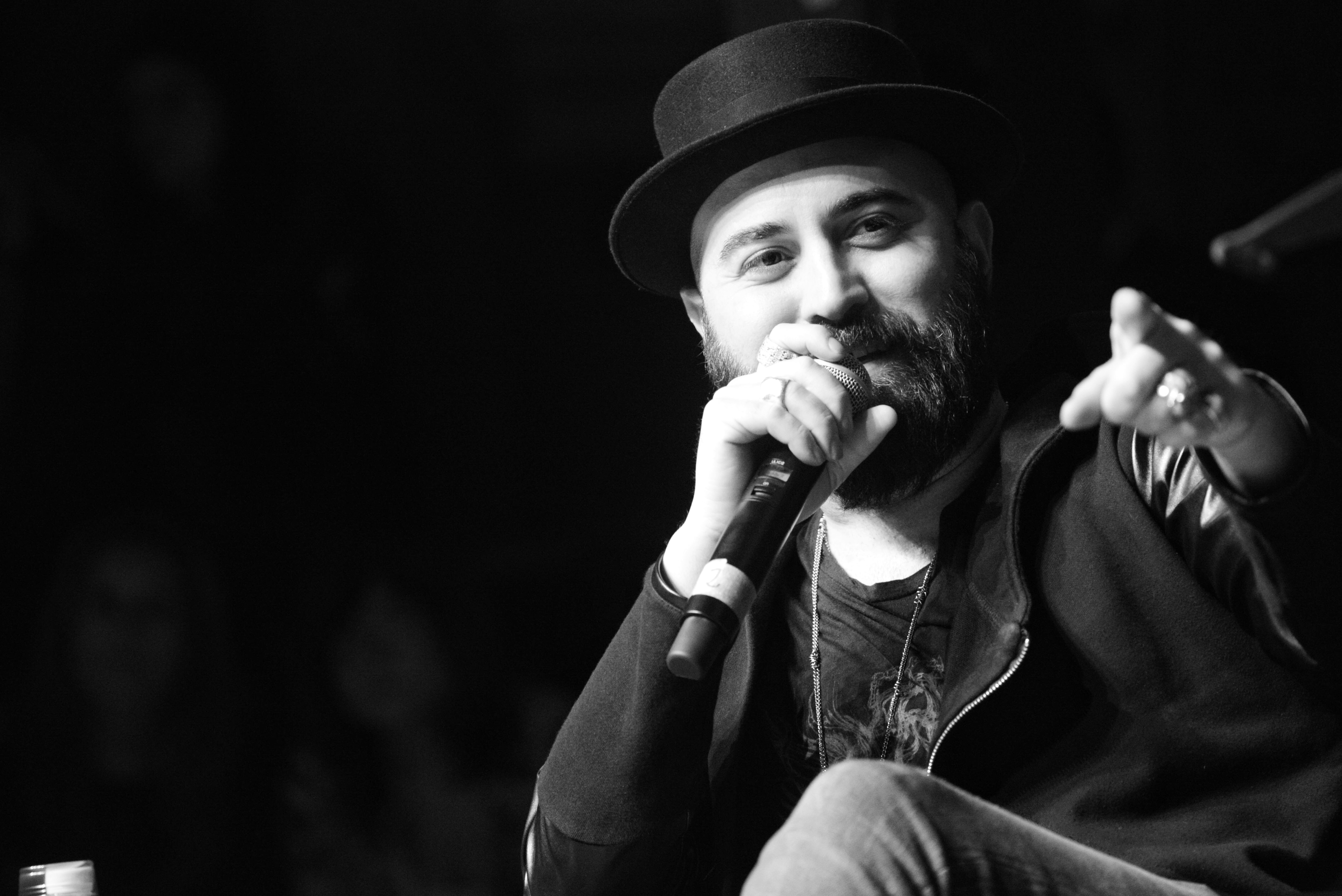
- Sangiorgi in 2017

Background information
- Born: 24 January 1979 (age 47); Nardò, Lecce, Italy
- Occupations: Singer, songwriter, musician
- Label: Sugar Music

Giuliano Sangiorgi (born 24 January 1979) is an Italian singer, songwriter and composer, forming part of the rock band Negramaro.

== Career ==
=== Solo career ===
Giuliano is not only the writer and singer for Negramaro, but he is also a songwriter and composer for other singers and cinematic productions.

In 2005 he began collaborating with the Italian cinema:

- Eight pieces from Negramaro's album Mentre tutto scorre became the soundtrack for Alessandro D’Alatri's film La Febbre.
- The piece "Mentre tutto scorre", written and composed by Giuliano Sangiorgi, won the Premio della Critica Radio e TV at the Sanremo Music Festival, the Nastro D’Argento as best song and best soundtrack and the SIAE Prize for its success, for the number of records sold, for public executions (concerts and discos), television, radio and cinemas.
- The song "Solo per te" was nominated for Donatello's David Award.
- In 2007 he was co-author and co-interpreter with Dolores O’Riordan for the piece "Senza fiato", title track for Marco Martani's film Cemento Armato.
- In 2008 he wrote the whole soundtrack for Daniele Gangemi’s film Una notte blu cobalto, which won the prize as best "first work" at Worldfest International Independent Film Festival of Houston.
- He wrote the soundtrack for Marcello and Dario Baldi’s film Narciso, winning a prize at Festival del Cinema di Salerno in the criteria "Nuovo cinema Italia" at Napoli film festival.
- In 2009 he signed the soundtrack for Giovanni Veronesi’s Italians.
- In 2010 he wrote the soundtrack for the film Vallanzasca-Gli angeli del male, directed by Michele Placido and presented, out of competition, at the 67th Venice Film Festival, the film was first shown in cinemas in January 2011 and the band obtained the Nastro D’Argento for the best original soundtrack.

He wrote, with Paolo Buonvino, "Tutto può succedere" for the theme song of the TV show of the same name – produced by Cattleya and on air on RAI Uno.

As a writer, in 2012 his book Lo spacciatore di Carne was published by Einaudi.

==== Songwriter for other artists ====
As a songwriter and composer for other artists, Giuliano Sangiorgi wrote:

- In 2004 “Le parole che non ti ho detto” for Andrea Bocelli’s album Andrea, which reached over 60 million copies sold in the world.
- In 2006 he participated to Corrado Rustici's album Deconstruction of a post modern musician for the piece "Maledette Stelle".
- In 2008 he made a duet with Cristina Donà in "Settembre”
- In 2008 he wrote and interpreted, with Lorenzo Jovanotti Cherubini, the hit "Safari”
- In 2009 he wrote "Come foglie" for Malika Ayane, this piece made her one of the winners in the youth criteria for the 2009 Sanremo Music Festival
- In 2009 he designed and promoted, with Lorenzo Jovanotti Cherubini and Mauro Pagani, the "Domani 24/04.09" project, where the objective was to raise funds for the reconstruction of the cultural centres, destroyed by the earthquake which occurred on 6 April 2009.

He also wrote:

- “Sono solo nuvole” for Laura Pausini.
- "Facciamola più semplice" for Emma.
- "Solo due Satellite" for Marco Mengoni.
- "Fammi respirare dai tuoi occhi" for Noemi.

In 2017

- He wrote the soundtrack for Giovanni Veronesi's film No Country for Young Men.
- The launched single "Fino all’imbrunire" was published and it preceded Negramaro’s new album amore che torni, due to be released in November.

==== List of awards ====
- M.E.I. prize.
- The Prize "Videoclip Italiano" (PVI).
- The "Mia Martini Prize"
- The Festivalbar first as revelation group and then as the winners.
- The Lunezia Prize

=== Negramaro ===
Sangiorgi formed Negramaro in 1999: six musicians from Lecce who have become a breakthrough act in the Italian pop-rock music scene.

- The first album 000577 (2003) featured Corrado Rustici (Eric Clapton, Sinead O’Connor, Andrea Bocelli, Zucchero, Elisa) as Artistic Producer
- In 2005 the band shared the stage with Oasis at Heineken Jammin' Festival and joined LIVE 8 in Rome.
- Negramaro won Best Italian Act at MTV Europe Music Awards 2005, in Lisbon.
- Mentre Tutto Scorre reached multiplatinum status.
- Their third album La finestra (2007) was recorded at the Plant Studios in San Francisco and the "special edition" of the album, hosted a very special guest appearance: Dolores O’Riordan on “Senza fiato”:
- Negramaro performed on 31 May 2008, at football stadium San Siro, the first Italian band ever to do this.
- “Negramaro San Siro live” (2008) was Negramaro's first live career CD+DVD, with 8 live versions of their most famous songs, 5 unpublished songs, the San Siro's concert and several extra contents.
- In 2010 the band wrote the soundtrack of Michele Placido's movie Vallanzasca – Gli Angeli del Male, presented at the 67th Mostra del Cinema di Venezia. In the same year they released CASA69, produced by David Bottrill (Placebo and many other), in Toronto.
- The band exceed over 1 million records sold only in Italy. Negramaro filled the stadiums again throughout the last June–July in Milan and Rome to follow up the #1 position on the Italian Chart after six months from the release of their Best Of Una Storia Semplice.
- They also played in some European Festivals in Europe: “Impact Festival”, “Tonhalle”, “Dortmunder Music Week” and London's “Hard Rock Calling”.
- 2016 was an intense year of musical activity. He went on a live tour with Negramaro, that sold out and had a gran finale at the Arena di Verona (first Italian band to play in the Arena di Verona)
- On 17 November 2017, he released the new album Amore che torni.

==== Discography with Negramaro ====
- "000577" (2004)
- "Mentre tutto scorre" (2005)
- "La finestra" (2007)
- "Negramaro San Siro Live" (2008)
- "Casa 69" (2010)
- "Una storia semplice" (2012)
- "La rivoluzione sta arrivando" (2015)
- "Amore che torni" (2017)
- "Contatto" (2020)
