= Delightful =

Delightful may refer to:

- Delightful, Ohio, a community in the United States
- Queen Delightful, fictional character in The 7D
- "Delightful", single by Narada Michael Walden from Garden of Love Light 1977
- "Delightful", single by the Happy Mondays from Loads (album) 1995
- Delightful E.P., another name for Forty Five E.P. debut E.P. from Happy Mondays 1995
- Delightful (Ami Suzuki song) 2005
