= Divine Emotion =

Studio album by Narada Michael Walden
- Released: 1988
- Studio: Tarpan Studios (San Rafael, California); Right Track Recording (Manhattan, New York)
- Label: Reprise
- Producer: Narada Michael Walden

Narada Michael Walden chronology
The Nature of Things (1985)	Divine Emotion (1988)	Sending Love to Everyone (1995)

Singles from Divine Emotion
- 1. "Divine Emotions" Released: March 14, 1988

Professional ratings
Review scores
Source	Rating
AllMusic	3/5 stars

Divine Emotion is the ninth studio album by American singer, songwriter, musician and record producer Narada Michael Walden (credited as Narada). It was released in 1988. The album includes the single "Divine Emotions", which reached number one on the US Dance Club Songs chart, number 21 on the Hot R&B/Hip-Hop Songs chart and number eight in the UK Singles Chart. Two other singles were released from the album: "Can't Get You Outta My Head" (UK No. 93) and "Wild Thing" (US R&B No. 97).

== Critical reception ==
A review in pan-European magazine Music & Media stated that Narada's "solo efforts are well worth an equal glory. This set brims over with slick, beautifully textured soul and pop", noting that the album contains "silky ballads", "intimate mid-tempo songs" and "musculardance-floor pop".

== Track listing ==
All tracks written by Narada Michael Walden and Jeffrey E. Cohen, except where noted.

1. "Divine Emotions" – 5:13
2. "Can't Get You Outta My Head" (Walden, Robert Lee Smith, David Frazer, Cohen) – 4:35
3. "That's the Way I Feel About Cha" (Walden, Corrado Rustici) – 4:26
4. "Wild Thing" – 5:02
5. "How Can I Make You Stay" (Walden, Sutunga Harry Austin, Walter Afanasieff) – 4:30
6. "Explosion" – 5:20
7. "I Belong" – 4:43
8. "But What Up Doh?" – 4:00
9. "Certain Kind of Lover" – 4:35
10. "Jam the Night" – 5:05
11. "We Still Have a Dream" (Walden) – 3:27

== Personnel ==
- Narada Michael Walden – lead vocals, drums (1, 2, 6, 8, 9, 11), Simmons drums (2), E-mu SP-12 (2), backing vocals (2), LinnDrum (3–5), Roland TR-808 (4), Linn 9000 (7), horn arrangements (9–11), Linn LM-1 (10)
- Walter Afanasieff – keyboards (1–10), horn arrangements (2, 6, 9, 10), Moog Modular bass (3, 5), Hammond B3 organ (9)
- David Sancious – keyboards (1, 2, 6, 8, 9)
- Frank Martin – acoustic piano (4), Rhodes electric piano (4), synthesizers (4), keyboards (11)
- Ren Klyce – Fairlight synthesizer intro (6), Fairlight explosion effects (6)
- Joyce Imbesi – additional keyboards (11)
- Corrado Rustici – MIDI guitar (1, 2, 4, 6, 8–11), "Daffy Duck" laugh (6), lead guitar solo (11), Peavey amps (11)
- Vernon "Ice" Black – rhythm guitar (7, 10), backing vocals (7)
- Randy Jackson – bass guitar (1, 8, 9, 11), Moog Source bass (2, 4, 6, 7, 10)
- Bongo Bob Smith – drum sampling, percussion programming
- Gigi Gonaway – cymbals (2, 5, 10), hi-hat (10), percussion (10)
- Harry "Sutunga" Austin – cymbals (5)
- Marc Russo – saxophone solo (1, 2, 9), horns (2, 6, 9, 11), saxophones (10), tenor sax solo (11)
- Clarence Clemons – saxophone solo (2–4)
- Premik Russell Tubbs – horns (2, 6, 9, 11)
- Wayne Wallace – horns (2, 6, 9, 11)
- Gary Grant – horns (2, 6, 9, 11)
- Jerry Hey – horns (2, 6, 9, 11), trumpet (10)
- Claytoven Richardson – backing vocals (1–10), voice intro (2)
- Ron Baccigaluppi – Italian voice (2)
- Kitty Beethoven – backing vocals (4–6, 8)
- Rosie Gaines – backing vocals (4–6, 8)
- Jim Gilstrap – backing vocals (4–6, 8)
- Melisa Kary – backing vocals (4)
- Jeanie Tracy – backing vocals (4–6, 8)
- Larry Batiste – backing vocals (7, 10)
- Alex Kash – backing vocals (7)

=== Production ===
- Narada Michael Walden – producer, arrangements
- Russ Titelman – additional vocal production (1, 2, 6)
- David Frazer – recording, mixing
- Dana Jon Chappelle – assistant engineer
- Lincoln Clapp – additional engineer, lead vocal overdubs (1, 2), vocal overdubs (6)
- Billy Miranda – additional assistant engineer
- Bob Ludwig – mastering at Masterdisk (New York, NY)
- Laura LiPuma – art direction
- Victoria Pearson – photography
- Rebecca Marceline – hair stylist
- Beth Katz – make-up
- Tracy Kirst – stylist
- Gregory Digiovine – management
- David Rubinson – management

== Charts ==
Chart (1988)	Peak position
Dutch Albums (Album Top 100)	61
Swedish Albums (Sverigetopplistan)	33
UK Albums Chart	60
US Billboard Top R&B Albums	67
