= Premik Russell Tubbs =

American musician and songwriter

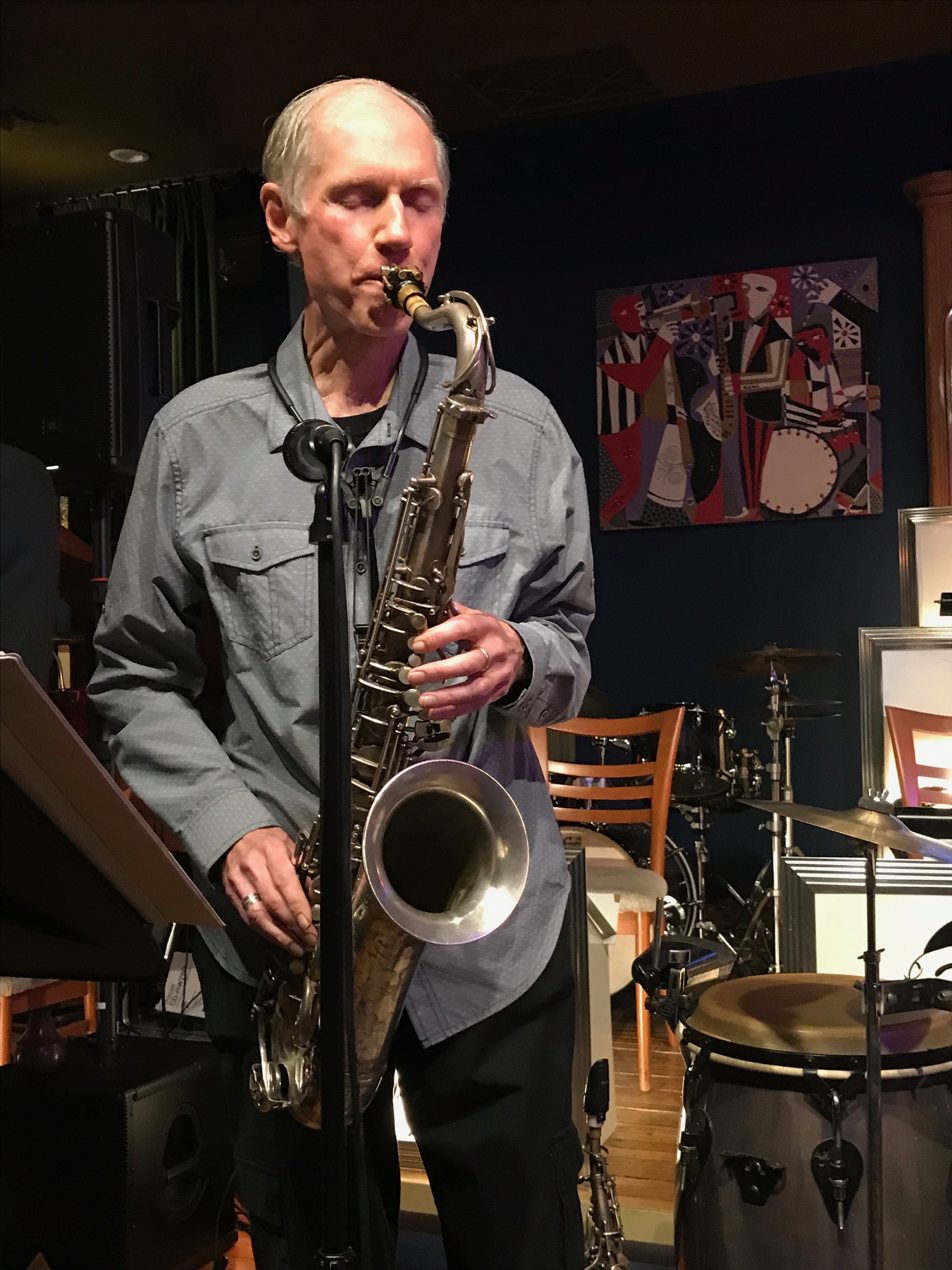
- Premik Russell Tubbs in 2022

Background information
- Born: August 3, 1952 (age 74); Croton-on-Hudson, New York
- Genres: Pop, jazz, East-West Fusion world New Age
- Occupations: Musician, songwriter, producer, arranger
- Instruments: Saxophone, flute, wind synthesizer, lap steel guitar, Lyricon
- Years active: 1974–present
- Website: www.premikmusic.com

Premik Russell Tubbs is an award-winning American saxophonist, songwriter, producer and multi-instrumentalist. His career spans several decades and includes collaborations with a range of artists, with performances in New York City at Carnegie Hall, Town Hall, Lincoln Center, Alice Tully Hall, The Beacon Theatre, Avery Fisher Hall (with The Mahavishnu Orchestra) (now David Geffen Hall) and at Top International Venues among them The Royal Albert Hall, Wembley Arena, London (with Carlos Santana), Le Pavillon de Paris... His work incorporates elements of jazz, pop, rock, Indian classical music, and New Age music. He is a virtuoso master on multiple saxophones, all flutes, wind synthesizers (EWI), and lap steel guitar. To date, Premik’s artistry appears on over 300 albums.

https://www.rootsmusicreport.com/reviews/view/1975/album-review-of-oneness-world-by-premik-russell-tubbs-and-margee-minier-tubbs

https://www.jwvibe.com/single-post/premik-russell-tubbs-margee-minier-tubbs-oneness-world

== Career ==
Since 1974, Premik has toured the world, has performed and/or recorded with John McLaughlin and The Mahavishnu Orchestra, Narada Michael Walden, Herbie Hancock, Ron Carter, Whitney Houston, Sting, Jackson Browne, Carlos Santana, Jeff Beck, Yoko Oginome, Cecil McBee, George Duke, Stanley Clarke, Jaco Pastorius, Jean-Luc Ponty, T.M. Stevens, Wayne Shorter, Clarence Clemons, Will Ackerman, Ravi and Anoushka Shankar, Krishna Das, Lady Gaga, Elton John, Billy Joel, James Taylor and many more. In December 1974, Premik Russell Tubbs performed on Mahavishnu Orchestra's album Visions of the Emerald Beyond, and in January 1975 he became an official member of the Mahavishnu Orchestra and toured Continental Europe and the United States with them. His saxophone was featured on hits such as Whitney Houston's "How Will I Know" and "Love Is A Contact Sport", Regina Belle's "Baby Come to Me and Jermaine Stewart's "We Don't Have to Take Our Clothes Off". In 1975, Premik performed with Carlos Santana to a sold out audience at the Nassau Colosseum and continued to perform with Santana into the 1980s. Premik performed on Carlos’ 1980 album, The Swing of Delight.

In 1983, Premik joined Lonnie Liston Smith's band, along with bass player Cecil McBee and in 1985 he played the Montreux Jazz Festival and recorded two albums with them. From 1991 to 1994 he toured with Scarlet Rivera (Bob Dylan's violinist). They also opened shows for Spyro Gyra. In the following years, he toured with jazz violinist Julie Lyonn Lieberman, Clara Ponty, Wendy Starland and in 2007 as a member of Radio Massacre International. In November 2011 he toured with both Grammy Winning musical artist Chandrika Tandon as well as Steve Gorn.

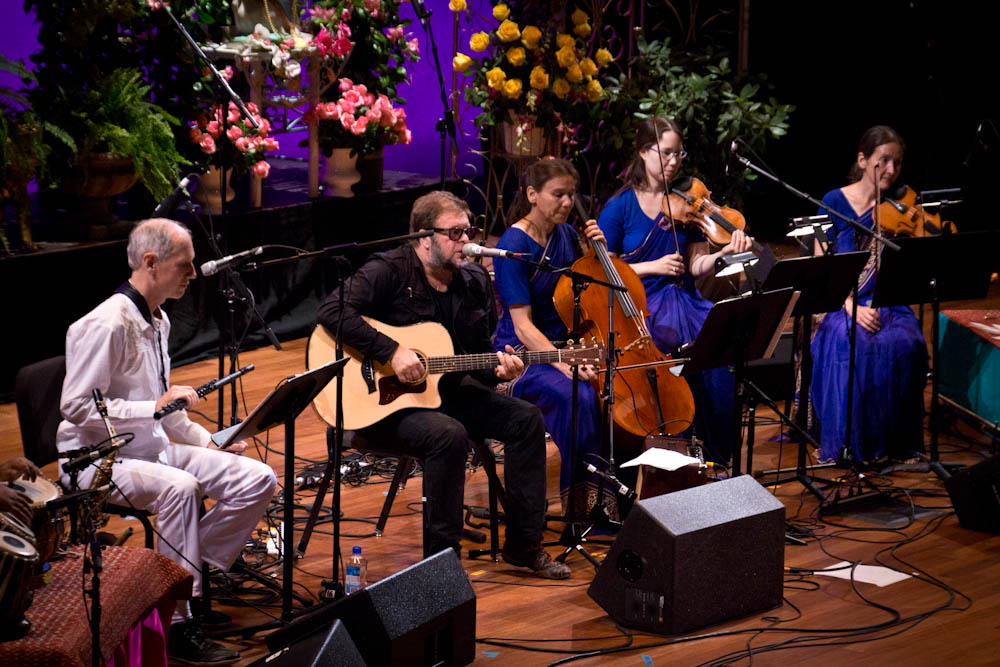
Tubbs on Concert 2011(left)

Premik has shared the stage and performed with Ravi & Anoushka Shankar, and has toured internationally around the world with Indian Violinist L. Subramaniam. Beginning in 2008, and through 2020, Premik was invited ten times to perform at Carnegie Hall in the Revlon Concert for the Rainforest Fund featuring Sting, Elton John, James Taylor, Lady Gaga, Bruno Mars, Tina Turner, Bruce Springsteen, Paul Simon, James Taylor, Stevie Wonder, Billy Joel, Meryl Streep, Jennifer Hudson, Rosanne Cash and Vince Gill and many more. On April 25, 2014, Premik performed as the featured soloist with the Royal Philharmonic Orchestra in Croydon, England.

Premik has recorded several world music records along with spiritual master Sri Chinmoy, Steve Booke and Shambhu Vineberg as well as music for different short films.

Since 2010, Premik is the on-call wind player for Grammy Award winning Producer & Artist Will Ackerman, founder of Windam Hill Records and has performed on dozens if his productions.

To date, Premik has performed at Carnegie Hall to a sold-out audience, 14 times: 1. April 13, 1980, Carlos Santana & Premik Russell Tubbs Duo Performance 2. April 13, 1982, @The Sri Chinmoy Peace Concert 3. 2008 with Sting during Sting & Trudie Styler’s Concert for the Rainforest 4. 2010 with Sting during Sting & Trudie Styler’s Concert for the Rainforest 5. January 16, 2012, with Karl Jenkins “The Peace Makers” 6. 2012 with Sting during Sting & Trudie Styler’s Concert for the Rainforest 7. January 20, 2014 with Karl Jenkins, “The Music of Karl Jenkins” Concert 8. 2014 with Sting during Sting & Trudie Styler’s Concert for the Rainforest 9. 2015 with Lynn Yew Evers, Dawn of Peace 10. December 2016 with Sting during Sting & Trudie Styler’s Concert for the Rainforest 11. 2017 FLOW Concert with Will Ackerman, Fiona Joy, Jeff Oster & Laurence Blatt 12. 2018 FLOW Concert with Will Ackerman, Fiona Joy, Jeff Oster & Laurence Blatt 13. December 2019 with Sting during Sting & Trudie Styler’s Concert for the Rainforest 14. July 2025 with Charu Suri performing SHAYAN

Premik is married to European/American fashion designer, songwriter/lyricist/composer and spoken word poet/vocalist Margee Minier-Tubbs, producer on the Grammy® Nominated album by Charu Suri, SHAYAN, Premik also being a featured flute player on this album. On July 7, 2026, they released their album In The Stillness Of The Stars, which has won the Global Music Silver Medal Award for Best New Age Album, has won the Clouzine International Music Award for BEST NEW AGE COMPOSITION, has won the One World Music Awards Best New Age Album Award, August 2026, has been Nominated for BEST NEW AGE ALBUM in The World Entertainment Awards, winners TBA on February 6, 2027. Their opening song 11:11 has won the Clouzine International Music Award for BEST NEW AGE SONG, has also received a WEA nomination for BEST NEW AGE Song. In 2025, Premik and his wife Margee co-composed their album Oneness-World, which has won BEST WORLD SONG for the opening track 'Oneness' and their song 'Joie de Vivre', as well as four(4) nominations in The Intercontinental Music Awards in the Best World Music category, and four(4) nominations in The World Entertainment Awards, a genre-blending album featuring multi-Grammy® Award Winning violinist Zach Brock. In 2024, together they created Margee's acclaimed children's album Pathways.

== Discography ==
- 1974: Mahavishnu Orchestra – Visions of the Emerald Beyond
- 1976: Narada Michael Walden – Garden of Love Light
- 1977: Narada Michael Walden – I Cry, I Smile
- 1980: Carlos Santana & Herbie Hancock – The Swing of Delight
- 1980: Premik Russell Tubbs - 'Transformation Dawn'
- 1982: Premik Russell Tubbs - 'Run To Tomorrow's Sun'
- 1984: Lonnie Liston Smith – Silhouettes
- 1985: Lonnie Liston Smith – Rejuvenation
- 1985: Clarence Clemons – Hero
- 1985: Whitney Houston – Whitney Houston
- 1985: Premik Russell Tubbs - Endless Energy, Sleepless Speed
- 1985: Premik Russell Tubbs - Jharna-Kala, Song-Garland
- 1986: Jermaine Stewart – Frantic Romantic
- 1986: Premik Russell Tubbs & Shambhu - 'Equinox'
- 1986: Premik Russell Tubbs & Clarence Clemons - 'BODY, HEART & SOUL
- 1987: Whitney Houston – Whitney
- 1987: Premik Russell Tubbs - 'A New World Of Peace'
- 1988: Yoko Oginome - 'VERGE OF LOVE'
- 1989: Yoko Oginome – Verge of Love
- 1989: Regina Belle – Stay with Me
- 1989: Kid 'N Play – Face the Nation
- 1992: Calverly – Avalon
- 1999: Edgar Paterson Mills - "Buddha on Mars'
- 1999: John Caraberis - 'Boundless'
- 2000: Luiz Simas - Recipe For Rhythm
- 2001: Premik Russell Tubbs – Equinox
- 2002: Ali Appel – Crooked Line
- 2004: Premik Russell Tubbs – Mission-Transcendence
- 2005: Kristin Hoffmann - 'Real'
- 2006: Gerald Jay Markoe – Celestial Music for Sitar
- 2006: Gerald Jay Markoe - 'Evening Star Meditation'
- 2006: Gerald Jay Markoe - 'Cosmic Orbit Meditation'
- 2006: Mission On Mars - 'Tarana Sessions'
- 2007: [The Mahavishnu Project] –'Return to the Emerald Beyond'
- 2008: Premik Russell Tubbs & Uli Geissendoerfer - 'Bangalore Breakdown, Diary'
- 2008: Steve Booke - 'Life Vibrations'
- 2009: Pavaka - 'Sabar Sathe'
- 2010: Premik Russell Tubbs & Steve Booke – Pratyavartana
- 2010: Shambhu - 'Sacred Love'
- 2011: Dean Boland - 'Soul Whispers'
- 2011: Premik Russell Tubbs - 'I Prayerfully Bow'
- 2011: Sri Chinmoy - Aum Meditation with Flute
- 2011: Fiona Joy Hawkins – Christmas Joy
- 2012: Fiona Joy Hawkins – Sensual Journeys
- 2012: Ronnda Cadle – Will's Embrace
- 2012: Dan Kennedy – Intuition
- 2012: Heidi Anne Breyer – Beyond the Turning
- 2012: Rebecca Harrold – The River of Life
- 2012: Ronnda Cadle - 'Will's Embrace'
- 2012: Masako - Masako
- 2013: Chandrika Krishnamurthy Tandon - 'Soul March'
- 2013: Asher Barkin – Birchos Avicha
- 2013: Shambhu – Dreaming of Now
- 2013: David Gale, Ken Doma - 'Cold Summer'
- 2014: Masako – Call of the Mountains
- 2014: Premik Russell Tubbs & Uli Geissendoerfer - 'Passport to Happyness'
- 2014: TriBeCaStan - Coal Again
- 2014: Ryan Michael Richards - 'Experiences'
- 2014: Andrew Kutt - 'Eagle Medicine'
- 2015: Ikhlaq Hussain - Destiny
- 2015: Neil Tatar - Learning To Fly
- 2015: Lynn Yew Evers - 'Elysian'
- 2015: Jeffrey Seeman - 'Everything In Between'
- 2015: Andrew Kutt - 'Earth Songs'
- 2015: TriBeCaStan - Goddess Polka Dottess
- 2016: Richard Carr - Matters of Balance
- 2016: Patrick Carmichael - 'Sanctuary'
- 2016: Kelly Andrew - 'Rendezvous'
- 2016: Lawrence Blatt - 'Longitudes & Latitudes'
- 2016: David Clavijo - 'Sitting on The Seawall'
- 2016: David Clavijo - From The Depths
- 2017: Shambhu - 'Soothe'
- 2017: Neil Tatar - 'After The Rain'
- 2017: Gina Leneé - 'Red Diamonds'
- 2017: Andrew Kutt - 'Bridge To Happiness'
- 2017: Alan Matthews - 'The Ineffable'
- 2017: Jennifer DeFrayne - 'Sisu'
- 2017: Bobby Rozario - Rudra
- 2018: Brenda Warren - Beautiful Journey
- 2018: Shambhu - Lilac Skies
- 2018: Karen Olson - SongPath
- 2018: Wivajoy, Fiona Joy Hawkins - 'Fair and White'
- 2019: Masako - Underwater Whisperer
- 2019: Todd Mosby - 'Open Waters'
- 2019: Robert Linton - 'Adrift in Wonder'
- 2019: Todd Mosby - 'Eagle Mountain'
- 2019: Ann Sweeten - Before Today, Beyond Tomorrow
- 2019: Gina Lineé - Revealed
- 2020: Masako - Hidden Flowers
- 2020: Todd Mosby - Aerial Views
- 2020: Robert Linton - 'In The Calm of Christmas'
- 2021: Bill Buchen - 'Zero Sum Game'
- 2021: Ryan Michael Richards - 'More Than Time'
- 2022: Laila Faerman - Awake Arise!
- 2022: Shambhu - 'Life Passage'
- 2023: Masako - ASCENT- Call of the Mountains II
- 2023: Kristin Hoffmann - Rain Shine
- 2023: The Folklorkestra - A Strange Day In June
- 2023: Ann Sweeten - Love Walks Through Rain
- 2023: Jon Perl's Dark Light - 'Link In The Chain'
- 2023: Laila Faerman - 'Beauty Came To Me'
- 2024: Luiz Simas - Simpatia Total
- 2024: Masako - Lost there Found here
- 2024: Rebecca Harold - Tree Of Life
- 2024: David Lindsay - With You
- 2024: Margee Minier-Tubbs - Pathways
- 2024: Peter Kfoury - The Journey Together
- 2025: Margee Minier-Tubbs - 'Oneness-World'
- 2025: Masako - 'Dreaming Northern'
- 2025: Assia Ahhatt - 'Born in Kyiv'
- 2025: Jonathan Perl - 'Universal Return'
- 2025: Alex Kaufman - 'Father'
- 2025: Charu Suri - 'Shayan'
- 2025: Ann Sweeten - 'Still'
- 2025: Shambhu - Transcendence
- 2025: Robert Linton - Away Into A Memory
- 2025: Bobby Rozario - Healer
- 2025: David Belmont - Castillo Music: 2001-2010, Mask
- 2025: David Lindsay - Follow The Sun
- 2026: Randal Meek - Under The Banyan Tree
- 2026: Sundad - Way Station One
- 2026: Nainnoh - Broken Waters
- 2026: Nainnoh - MZE
- 2026: Jennifer DeFrayne - Soul Love
- 2026: Dore Coller - The Great Unknown
- 2026: Margee Minier-Tubbs & Premik Russell Tubbs - In The Stillness Of The Stars
- 2026: David Fogel - Symphonina Stories: New Horizons
- 2026: The Grandbouche Project - Dust
- 2026: Will Ackerman - Home
