= Live in Asbury Park, Vol. 2 =

Live album by Clarence Clemons, Temple of Soul
- Released: January 6, 2004
- Genre: Soul, Rock, Pop
- Label: Valley Entertainment

Clarence Clemons, Temple of Soul chronology
| Live in Asbury Park (2002) | Live in Asbury Park, Vol. 2 (2004) | Brothers in Arms |

Live in Asbury Park, Vol. 2 is a Clarence Clemons and Temple of Soul album that was recorded live at The Stone Pony in Asbury Park, New Jersey on September 2–3, 2001. The album features a guest performance by Bruce Springsteen on lead vocals and lead guitar for the song “Raise Your Hand”.

== Track listing ==
1. "Another Place – Clarence Clemons, Jimmy Dillon – 3:10
2. "Fatha John" - Clarence Clemons, John Colby – 3:56
3. "Livin’ Without You" – Clarence Clemons, John Colby – 4:38
4. "Confession" - Clarence Clemons – 2:01
5. "Road to Paradise" – Clarence Clemons, Jimmy Dillon, Dan Shea – 4:24
6. "You're a Friend Of Mine" – Narada Michael Walden, Jeff Cohen – 5:08
7. "I’ll Go Crazy" – James Brown – 5:06
8. "Raise Your Hand" – Steve Cropper, Eddie Floyd, Al Bell – 7:04
9. "Lights Of The City" - Clarence Clemons – 5:25
10. "Pink Cadillac" – Bruce Springsteen – 11:31

== Personnel ==
- Produced by Clarence Clemons and John Colby
- Recorded and mixed by Toby Scott
- Clarence Clemons – saxophone, vocals, percussion
- Steve Argy – bass, vocals
- John Colby – piano, synthesizers, vocals
- Keith Cronin – drums
- Tomas Diaz – percussions, vocals
- Randi Fishenfeld – violin, vocals
- Billy Livesay – guitars, vocals
- Paul Pettitt – organ, synthesizers, vocals

The Uptown Horns:

- Crispin Cioe – alto, baritone sax
- Larry Etkin – trumpet
- Bob Funk – trombone
- Arno Hecht – tenor sax
