= John Colby (musician) =

American musician, producer composer and keyboardist

- Born: John Andrew Colby; April 23, 1949 (age 76); U.S.
- Website: colbymusic.com

John Andrew Colby (born April 23, 1949) is an American musician. He is a music producer composer and keyboardist.

Colby produced the score for the 1981 Academy Award nominated Ken Burns documentary Brooklyn Bridge, wrote and produced the score for the Academy Award nominee The Garden of Eden, and received a Grammy as producer for the soundtrack of Ken Burns' Civil War in the best traditional folk category.

He was music director of ESPN from 1984 to 1992 and wrote the SportsCenter theme (dadada), the best known sports theme of its time.

As keyboardist and band leader for Clarence Clemons, he produced Live in Asbury Park I and II.

Colby wrote the NFL theme for NBC in the 1990s and wrote the themes for Super Bowls XXVI and XXVII. His music is heard all over the world on ESPN, Fox, ABC, Comedy Central and Spike.

Three of his songs, "Gladiator," "Eric D.," and "Arnold" were commonly used on the ESPN show NFL Primetime. Three other songs of his, "Gothic," "Terminator," and "Gelman" were used on the show in the early 1990s, however they were phased out as the decade went on.
