= You're a Friend of Mine =

1985 single by Clarence Clemons and Jackson Browne

Single by Clarence Clemons and Jackson Browne

from the album Hero
- B-side: "Let the Music Say It"
- Released: October 1985
- Recorded: 1985, US
- Genre: Jazz rock, dance-rock
- Length: 4:48 (album version); 4:12 (single edit)
- Label: Columbia
- Songwriters: Narada Michael Walden, Jeffrey Cohen
- Producer: Narada Michael Walden

Clarence Clemons singles chronology
"Resurrection Shuffle" (1983)	"You're a Friend of Mine" (1985)	"I Wanna Be Your Hero" (1986)

"You're a Friend of Mine" is a 1985 hit song, written by Narada Michael Walden and Jeffrey Cohen, with lead vocals by Clarence Clemons and Jackson Browne in a duet. At the time of the song's release, Clemons was already well known nationally as the saxophonist in Bruce Springsteen's E Street Band. The song was released on Clemons's solo album Hero (1985). Browne's then-girlfriend Daryl Hannah provides background vocals and appears in the song's music video painting and later filming the duo. Also appearing in the video is a backing band, including songwriter Walden on drums. The B-side was "Let the Music Say It", a non-album track written by Clemons and Michael Jonzun.

Originally Clemons was to sing this with Bruce Springsteen, but Springsteen was on his honeymoon with first wife Julianne Phillips, instead Springsteen suggested that his longtime friend Jackson Browne sing it with Clemons.

The song was a commercial success, reaching the top 20 on the Billboard Hot 100 (#18), Mainstream Rock (#16), and the top 40 on the Adult Contemporary (#21) charts in the U.S. The song also reached the top 20 in Ireland on the Irish Singles Chart (#18).

A live version of the song was recorded on Clemons's 2004 album with Temple of Soul entitled Live in Asbury Park, Vol. 2.

Singing cousins Whitney Houston & Dionne Warwick sang a live version of "You're a Friend of Mine" on Solid Gold in January of 1986, which can be found on YouTube.

This song was used by the World Wrestling Federation (WWE) in early 1986, to cement a storyline involving a feud between "Rowdy" Roddy Piper and "Ace" Cowboy Bob Orton, culminating with a montage of their work together from 1984 to 1986. It was also used again on 02/03/1989 on NBC's The Main Event to show the close friendships of The Mega Powers: Hulk Hogan, Randy "Macho Man" Savage, and Miss Elizabeth.

== Charts ==
=== Weekly charts ===
Chart (1985–1986)	Peak position
Australia (Kent Music Report)	9
Belgium (Ultratop 50 Flanders)	12
Ireland	18
Netherlands (Dutch Top 40)	7
Netherlands (Single Top 100)	10
US Billboard Hot 100	18
US Adult Contemporary (Billboard)	21
US Mainstream Rock (Billboard)	16

=== Year-end charts ===
Chart (1986)	Position
Australia (Kent Music Report)	55
Belgium (Ultratop Flanders)	86
Netherlands (Dutch Top 40)	66
