= Nick Clemons =

American musician (born 1968)

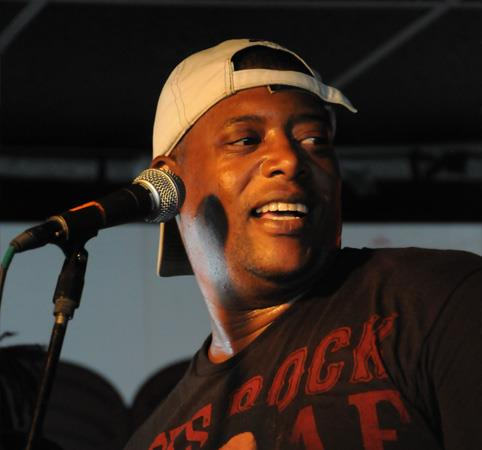
- Nick Clemons performing at the Wonder Bar in Asbury Park, NJ

Background information
- Also known as: Nick Clemons
- Born: Clarence Anicholas Clemons III; November 25, 1968 (age 57)
- Origin: New Jersey
- Genres: Rock; Funk; R&B
- Occupation: Musician
- Instruments: Vocals; harmonica
- Website: Facebook Page

Clarence Anicholas Clemons III (born November 25, 1968) is an American musician and the eldest son of Jackie and Clarence Clemons, a prominent member of Bruce Springsteen's E Street Band. In 1993, Nick released his first EP titled 'Waiting for You'. He has shared the stage with Bobby Bandiera, John Eddie, New Riders of the Purple Sage, Jimmy Vivino, and Clarence Clemons.

== Biography ==
Born and raised in New Jersey, Clemons was affectionately known as "Nicky" to family and friends as a child and eventually began using the name Nick, a shortened version of the middle name he shares with his famous father and grandfather.

Nick did not begin to develop his own musical talents until later in life. His father had always envisioned he would pursue a career in law. After opening for a Clarence Clemons New Year's Show with a short acoustic set, he began a career in music.

He soon moved to Ocean City, Maryland, and set to work developing his own musical chops by playing local gigs with another Jersey boy, guitar player Joe Boris of the jam band One-Eyed Jack. The two started a band with bass player Andre Cholomondeley, from the Frank Zappa tribute band Project Object and veteran New Jersey drummer Bob Ramos. Nick's early band toured local venues along the East Coast and in California. Nick worked for 5 years with Jersey cover band Bare Wires featuring Dave DeSantis on Drums, Markus Barth on Bass and Jim Keegan on guitars. They performed up and down the east coast opening for Nick's Dad Clarence Clemons. Performing as the All Zeros Band, Bare Wires recorded with Nick and the first tracks, Downstream, Solid, Captain Corey and Now Worries were on their first EP release featuring dad Clarence on Sax for No Worries and Captain Corey. The songs were recorded at Ocean Way Studios in New Jersey and mixed and mastered at Granite Alps Recording Studios in Wayne, NJ. Mixed and mastered by Markus Barth.

Nick's band, The Nick Clemons Band, has been touring bringing an original fusion of rock, jazz and funk to venues all across North America. "The most important thing to me" Clemons says, "is to get a warm feeling from a crowd, that juice or electricity that makes you want to give more."

Nick's other artistic interests include acting, and building a production company to develop and manage other musicians, as well as producing events for charity. Nick is the producer of the Annual Asbury Park Comedy Fest. Nick's primary passion is raising his son. When not making memories with his son or songwriting or performing, Nick enjoys playing golf.

== Musical style ==
Nick has been influenced and coached by such notable songwriters and producers as Jordan De la Sierra and Narada Michael Walden.

== Band ==
The Nick Clemons Band currently includes:

- Nick Clemons – lead vocals, harmonica
- Eric Gonzalez – drums, percussion
- Muddy Shews – bass
- Joey Stann – saxophone
- Frederika Krier – violin
- Jake Hughes – keyboards
