= Live in Asbury Park =

Live album by Clarence Clemons, Temple of Soul
- Released: November 5, 2002
- Genre: Soul, Rock, Pop
- Label: Valley Entertainment

Clarence Clemons, Temple of Soul chronology
Live in Asbury Park (2002)	Live in Asbury Park, Vol. 2 (2004)

Live in Asbury Park is a Clarence Clemons and Temple of Soul album that was recorded live at The Stone Pony in Asbury Park, New Jersey on September 2–3, 2001.

== Track listing ==
1. "Washington Bond" – Clarence Clemons, Jimmy Dillon, Dan Shea – 4:52
2. "Small Things" – Bruce Springsteen - 3:08
3. "CC Angel" - Clarence Clemons – 5:25
4. "Sax In The City" – Clarence Clemons, John Colby – 4:02
5. "Heat Of A Full Moon" – Billy Livesay, Dave Graham – 3:50
6. "Jump Start My Heart" – Desmond Child, Jeff Kent, Ellie Greenwich – 4:23
7. "Livin' Without You" - Clarence Clemons, John Colby – 4:54
8. "Fatha John" - Clarence Clemons, John Colby – 3:54
9. "Don’t Walk Away" - Clarence Clemons, Jimmy Dillon, Kevin Russell – 4:57
10. "Paradise By The C" - Bruce Springsteen – 3:11
11. "Road To Paradise" - Clarence Clemons, Jimmy Dillon, Dan Shea – 4:22
12. "Savin’ Up" - Bruce Springsteen – 5:36

== Personnel ==
- Produced by Clarence Clemons and John Colby
- Recorded and mixed by Toby Scott
- Clarence Clemons – saxophone, vocals, percussion
- Steve Argy – bass, vocals
- John Colby – piano, synthesizers, vocals
- Keith Cronin – drums
- Tomas Diaz – percussions, vocals
- Randi Fishenfeld – violin, vocals
- Billy Livesay – guitars, vocals
- Paul Pettitt – organ, synthesizers, vocals

The Uptown Horns:

- Crispin Cioe – alto, baritone sax
- Larry Etkin – trumpet
- Bob Funk – trombone
- Arno Hecht – tenor sax
