= Confidence (Narada Michael Walden album) =

Studio album by Narada Michael Walden
- Released: 1982
- Recorded: 1981–1982
- Studio: The Automatt (San Francisco, CA); George Massenburg Studios (West Los Angeles, CA); Eldorado Station Studios (Burbank, CA); The Power Station (New York, NY)
- Genre: Soul, R&B, dance
- Length: 40:24
- Label: Atlantic
- Producer: Narada Michael Walden

Narada Michael Walden chronology
Victory (1980)	Confidence (1982)	Looking at You, Looking at Me (1983)

Confidence is the sixth full-length studio recording from singer/songwriter/drummer/producer Narada Michael Walden. It was his first album wherein he co-wrote every single song with other people.

== Track listing ==
1. "You're #1" (Narada Michal Walden, Allee Willis, Bob Castell Blanch, Frank Martin) - 5:43
2. "Summer Lady" (N.M. Walden, Lisa Walden, Corrado Rustici) - 5:18
3. "I'm Ready" (N.M. Walden, Willis, Blanch) - 4:20
4. "Safe in My Arms" (N.M. Walden, Jeffrey E. Cohen) - 4:14
5. "Confidence" (N.M. Walden, Willis, Blanch) - 4:01
6. "Holiday" (N.M. Walden, Willis) - 4:27
7. "You Ought to Love Me" (N.M. Walden, Willis, Randy Jackson) - 5:10
8. "Blue Side of Midnight" (N.M. Walden, Willis) - 6:57

== Personnel ==
- Narada Michael Walden – lead vocals, backing vocals, keyboards, drums, percussion, ending chant (1), finger snaps (2), acoustic piano (4), BGV arrangements (4)
- Frank Martin – keyboards, synth solo (5, 7), synthesizer arrangements (6)
- Corrado Rustici – guitars, guitar solo (1, 5), "space" guitar (8)
- Joe-Bob Castelle Blanch – lead guitar, rhythm guitar, guitar solo (7)
- Randy Jackson – bass guitar, finger snaps (2)
- John Barnes – synth bass (1)
- Charles Chapman – finger snaps (2)
- Marc Russo – alto saxophone (1, 3), sax solo (3)
- Ernie Watts – tenor saxophone (1, 3)
- David Sanborn – alto saxophone (2)
- Bob Mintzer – tenor saxophone (2)
- Wayne Shorter – soprano sax solo (8)
- Chuck Findley – trumpet (1, 3)
- Jerry Hey – trumpet (1, 3), horn arrangements (1, 3)
- Randy Brecker – trumpet (2), horn arrangements (2)
- Dwayne Simmons – ending chant (1), finger snaps (2)
- Felton Pilate – backing vocals (2)
- Martha Rubinson – French summer lady voice (2)
- Jim Gilstrap – backing vocals (4, 6)
- John Lehman – backing vocals (4, 6)
- Myrna Matthews – backing vocals (4, 6)
- Wanda Walden – backing vocals (4, 6)

Strings (Tracks 3, 4 & 8)

- Michael Gibbs – arrangements
- Nathan Rubin – concertmaster
- Terry Adams and David Kadarauch – cello
- Thomas Elliott and David George – viola
- Patrice Anderson, Walter Ayres India Cooke, Clifton Foster, Stephen Gehl, Roy Malan, Greg Mazmanian, Nathan Rubin and Emily Van Valkenburgh – violin

== Production ==
- Narada Michael Walden – producer
- Bob Clearmountain – engineer
- Mick Guzauski – engineer
- Dave Jerden – engineer
- Leslie Ann Jones – engineer
- Ken Kessie – engineer
- Maureen Droney – second engineer
- Murray Dvorkin – second engineer
- Brian Malouf – second engineer
- Malcolm Pollack – second engineer
- Wayne Lewis – second engineer
- Bernie Grundman – mastering at A&M Studios (Hollywood, California)
- Bob Defrin – art direction
- Loren Hammer – photography
- Gregory Digiovine – management
- Adam's Dad Management Co. – management
