= Victory (Narada Michael Walden album) =

Studio album by Narada Michael Walden
- Released: 1980
- Recorded: 1979
- Studio: The Automatt (San Francisco, California); The Power Station (New York City, New York)
- Genre: Soul, R&B, disco
- Label: Atlantic
- Producer: Narada Michael Walden, Bob Clearmountain

Narada Michael Walden chronology
The Dance of Life (1979)	Victory (1980)	Confidence (1982)

Victory is the fifth full-length studio release from the American R&B singer and producer Narada Michael Walden. Released in 1980 on Atlantic, it featured him once again teaming up with producer Bob Clearmountain.

== Track listing ==
All songs written by Narada Michael Walden, except where noted.

1. "The Real Thang" (Walden, Bunny Hull, Corrado Rustici) - 5:37
2. "I Want You" (Walden, Rustici, Lisa Walden) - 4:33
3. "Take it to the Bossman" (Walden, Randy Jackson, Vicki Randle) - 4:21
4. "Alone Without You" (Walden, Hull) - 4:28
5. "Get Up!" - 4:25
6. "Lucky Fella" (Walden, Rustici) - 4:22
7. "You Will Find Your Way" - 4:10
8. "Victory Suite" - 8:35
  - "The Theme"
  - "The Battle/Hero-Soldiers Battle the Hostile Forces"
  - "Victory for the Hero-Soldiers"

== Personnel ==
- Narada Michael Walden – lead vocals, acoustic piano, drums, percussion, horn arrangements
- Frank Martin – keyboards, Dyno-Rhodes piano, Moog synthesizers, Prophet-5, backing vocals
- Corrado Rustici – guitars, cowbell, backing vocals
- Randy Jackson – bass
- The "See America Horns":
  - Marc Russo – alto saxophone, tenor saxophone, horn arrangements
  - Wayne Wallace – alto saxophone, tenor saxophone, horn arrangements
  - David Grover – trumpet, flugelhorn, slide trumpet, horn arrangements
  - Bill Lamb – trumpet, flugelhorn, slide trumpet
- Donna Dickerson – backing vocals
- Jim Gilstrap – backing vocals
- Vicki Randle – backing vocals
- Carla Vaughn – backing vocals

== Production ==
- Narada Michael Walden – producer, arrangements
- Bob Clearmountain – producer, engineer, mixing
- Lucy Laurie – assistant engineer
- Wayne Lewis – assistant engineer
- Raymond Willard – assistant engineer
- Dennis King – mastering at Atlantic Studios (New York, NY)
- Lynn Dreese Breslin – design
- Norman Seeff – photography
- Gregory Digivione – management
