= Hero (Clarence Clemons album) =

Studio album by Clarence Clemons
- Released: November 8, 1985
- Recorded: March−August 1985
- Studio: Tarpan Studios (San Rafael, CA): The Plant (Sausalito, CA); Shore Fire Studios (Long Branch, NJ); Carnegie Hill Studios, Mediasound Studios and Shakedown Sound (New York City, NY); Mission Control Studios, (Boston, MA)
- Genre: Pop
- Length: 41:56
- Label: Columbia/CBS Records
- Producer: Narada Michael Walden; Michael Jonzun; Arthur Baker; Morrie Brown

Clarence Clemons chronology
The Chief (1984)	Hero (1985)	A Night With Mr. C (1989)

Professional ratings
Review scores
Source	Rating
Allmusic	4/5 stars

Hero is a studio album by Clarence Clemons. Known for his saxophone work with Bruce Springsteen's E Street Band, Clemons released this pop album at the height of Springsteen's popularity following the success of Born in the U.S.A. It spawned two hit singles, 1985's "You're a Friend of Mine", a duet with Jackson Browne also featuring Browne's then-girlfriend Daryl Hannah on background vocals, and 1986's "I Wanna Be Your Hero".

== Track listing ==
No.	Title	Writer(s)	Length
1.	"You're a Friend of Mine"	Narada Michael Walden, Jeffrey Cohen	4:49
2.	"Temptation"	Narada Michael Walden, Jeffrey Cohen	4:53
3.	"It's Alright With Me Girl"	Clarence Clemons, Michael Jonzun	4:08
4.	"Liberation Fire (Mokshagun)"	Narada Michael Walden	3:59
5.	"The Sun Ain't Gonna Shine Anymore"	Bob Crewe, Bob Gaudio	4:26
6.	"I Wanna Be Your Hero"	Clarence Clemons, Jeffrey Cohen, Preston Glass, Narada Michael Walden	4:49
7.	"Cross The Line"	Morrie Brown, Clarence Clemons, Jude Johnstone, Lloyd Landesman	3:59
8.	"Kissin' On U"	Narada Michael Walden, Jeffrey Cohen	5:13
9.	"Christina"	Narada Michael Walden, Jeffrey Cohen	5:51
Total length:			41:56

== Charts ==
Chart (1986)	Peak position
Australian (Kent Music Report)	55

== Personnel ==
- Clarence Clemons (Note: The album's liner notes credit Clemons' performing and songwriting to "Mokshagun Clarence Clemons"; Mokshagun is a spiritual name given to Clemons by Sri Chinmoy.) – saxophone, lead vocals (1–3, 6, 8), backing vocals (3, 7, 9), vocals (5), lead rap (8)
- David Sancious – keyboards (1, 2, 6, 9)
- Preston Glass – additional keyboards (1, 2, 6), vibraphone (4), keyboard vibes (8), keyboards (9), acoustic guitar (9)
- Booker T. Jones – organ (1, 2, 6, 9)
- Michael Jonzun – keyboards (3), synthesizer programming (3), drums (3), marimba (3), backing vocals (3)
- Gordon Worthy – Hammond B3 organ (3)
- Frank Martin – keyboards (4)
- Richard Scher – keyboards (5)
- Lloyd Landesman – keyboards (7), LinnDrum programming (7), backing vocals (7)
- Walter Afanasieff – keyboards (8), keyboard bass sequencer (8), sound effects (8)
- Corrado Rustici – guitars (1, 2, 4, 8), electric guitars (9)
- Billy Loosigian – lead guitar (3), acoustic guitar (3)
- Tony "Rocks" Cowans – rhythm guitar (3)
- Carlos Pepper – rhythm guitar (3)
- Lewis West – rhythm guitar (3)
- Vernon "Ice" Black – guitars (4)
- Stuart Kimball – guitars (5)
- Bobby Messano – guitars (7)
- Randy Jackson – bass (1, 2, 4, 6, 9), electric bass (8), drums (9), percussion (9)
- Maurice Starr – bass (3)
- Doug Wimbish – bass (5)
- John Siegler – bass (7)
- Narada Michael Walden – drums (1, 2, 4, 6, 8), percussion (1, 2, 6, 8), church bells (1), keyboards (4)
- Billy Beard – drums (5)
- Anton Fig – drums (7)
- Greg "Gigi" Gonaway – glockenspiel (1), electronic percussion (8)
- Bill Sebastian – glockenspiel (3)
- Bashiri Johnson – percussion (5)
- Premik McFly – baritone saxophone (1)
- Michael Rado – harp (1)
- David Frazer – sound effects (8)
- Stuart "Satoshi" Hirotsu – sound effects (8)
- Jackson Browne – lead vocals (1)
- Daryl Hannah – backing vocals (1)
- Craig Thomas – backing vocals (1, 7, 9), additional vocals (2, 6), additional saxophone (4), lead vocals (7, 9)
- Hangsa – backing vocals (1)
- Sundan – backing vocals (1)
- Princess Loria – backing vocals (3)
- Charles Robins – backing vocals (3)
- Richard "Hock" Walsh – backing vocals (3)
- Mark Weiner – spiritual advisor (3)
- Darlene Love – vocals (5)
- Tina B. – backing vocals (5)
- Lotti Golden – backing vocals (5)
- B.J. Nelson – backing vocals (5)
- Norman Mershon – backing vocals (7)
- Kitty Beethoven – backing vocals (8)
- Jennifer Hall – backing vocals (8)
- Liz Jackson – backing vocals (8)

=== Production ===
- Narada Michael Walden – producer (1, 2, 4, 6, 8, 9), arrangements (1, 2, 4, 6, 8, 9), reducing (1, 2, 4, 6, 8, 9)
- Michael Jonzun – producer (3), arrangements (3), engineer (3)
- Gordon Worthy – associate producer (3)
- Arthur Baker – producer (5)
- Morrie Brown – producer (7), arrangements (7)
- Lloyd Landesman - co-producer (7), arrangements (7)
- Michael H. Brauer – chief engineer (1, 2, 4, 6, 8, 9)
- David Frazer – chief engineer (1, 2, 4, 6, 8, 9)
- Sidney Burton – engineer (3)
- Frank Heller – engineer (3)
- Tom Moore – engineer (3)
- Ed Stasium – mix engineer (3)
- Alvin Meyerson – engineer (5)
- Rob Taustin – engineer (5)
- Andy Wallace – engineer (5)
- Tom Lord-Alge – mixing (5)
- Steve Goldman – engineer (7)
- Dana Jon Chappelle – assistant engineer (1, 2, 4, 6, 8, 9)
- Tim Hatfield – assistant engineer (1, 2, 4, 6, 8, 9)
- Stuart "Satoshi" Hirotsu – assistant engineer (1, 2, 4, 6, 8, 9)
- Michael Hommel – assistant engineer (1, 2, 4, 6, 8, 9)
- Geoff Keehn – assistant engineer (1, 2, 4, 6, 8, 9)
- Gordon Lyon – assistant engineer (1, 2, 4, 6, 8, 9)
- Arthur Payson – assistant engineer (1, 2, 4, 6, 8, 9)
- Scott Yetka – assistant engineer (1, 2, 4, 6, 8, 9)
- George Marino – mastering at Sterling Sound (New York, NY)
- Clarence Clemons – cover concept
- Caroline Greyshock – photography
- Christopher Austopchuk – art direction
