= Divine Emotions =

Single by Narada Michael Walden

from the album Divine Emotion
- B-side: "Tighter"
- Released: March 14, 1988
- Genre: R&B, funk
- Length: 5:13 (album version); 4:12 (single mix); 8:48 (12" version); 4:27 (Bright Lights, Big City soundtrack version)
- Label: Reprise Records
- Songwriters: Narada Michael Walden, Jeffrey Cohen
- Producer: Narada Michael Walden

"Divine Emotions" is a 1988 single by Narada Michael Walden, from the album Divine Emotion. A successful producer, Walden billed himself as Narada for his later music releases. After producing acts like Aretha Franklin and Whitney Houston in the mid-1980s, Walden released "Divine Emotions," in 1988. The single went to number one on the Billboard dance club play chart for one week. Although the single did not chart on the Hot 100, it peaked at number twenty-one on the soul singles chart. Overseas, "Divine Emotions", was a top-ten hit in the UK, peaking at number 8, in the Netherlands, Luxembourg and the Flanders region of Belgium.

== Critical reception ==
A review in pan-European magazine Music & Media described "Divine Emotions" an "appealing pop/disco in a festive production".

== Use in media ==
The song was featured in the 1988 film, Bright Lights, Big City and on the soundtrack for the video game Grand Theft Auto: Episodes from Liberty City. The instrumental for the song was used as the original theme to the Canadian dance music show Electric Circus

== Personnel ==
- Narada Michael Walden: lead vocals, songwriter, producer, arranger, Simmons drums
- Jeffrey Cohen: songwriter
- David Sancious: Fairlight keyboards
- Walter "Baby Love" Afanasieff: Roland Juno keyboards
- Robert "Bongo Bob" Smith: drum sampling, percussion programming
- Randy "The King" Jackson: Spector bass guitar
- Corrado Rustici: Jackson MIDI guitar solo
- Marc Russo: saxophone
- Claytoven Richardson: background vocals

== Track listings ==
- 7": Reprise (US)/ 9 27967-7
1. "Divine Emotions (Single Mix)" - 4:12 ^
2. "Tighter" - 5:08
- 12": Reprise (US)/ 0-20874
1. "Divine Emotions (Remix)" - 8:48 ^
2. "Divine Emotions (Dub Mix)" - 7:45
3. "Divine Emotions (Single Mix)" - 4:12 ^
4. "Tighter" - 5:08
- 3 Inch CD Single: Reprise (Europe)/ 920 955-2, W 7967 CD
1. "Divine Emotions (Remix)" - 8:48 ^
2. "Divine Emotions (Single Mix)"- 4:12 ^
3. "Tighter" - 5:08

^Remix by Shep Pettibone

== Charts ==
=== Weekly charts ===
Chart (1988)	Peak position
Belgium (Ultratop 50 Flanders)	6
Europe (Eurochart Hot 100)	31
Europe (European Airplay Top 50)	10
Ireland (IRMA)	15
Italy Airplay (Music & Media)	11
Luxembourg (Radio Luxembourg)	5
Netherlands (Dutch Top 40)	4
Netherlands (Single Top 100)	8
UK Singles (OCC)	8
US Hot R&B/Hip-Hop Songs (Billboard)	21
US Dance Club Songs (Billboard)	1
West Germany (GfK)	35

=== Year-end charts ===
Chart (1988)	Position
Belgium (Ultratop Flanders)	66
Netherlands (Dutch Top 40)	47
Netherlands (Single Top 100)	90
