= The Dance of Life (album) =

Studio album by Narada Michael Walden
- Released: 1979
- Recorded: 1979
- Studios: Filmways-Heider (San Francisco, California); The Power Station (New York City, New York)
- Genres: R&B, disco
- Length: 43:35
- Label: Atlantic
- Producers: Narada Michael Walden, Bob Clearmountain

Narada Michael Walden chronology
Awakening (1979)	The Dance of Life (1979)	Victory (1980)

Professional ratings
Review scores
Source	Rating
AllMusic	4/5 stars

The Dance of Life is the second 1979 studio disc from R&B singer-songwriter/drummer/producer Narada Michael Walden. Unlike his last two releases, it featured several songs Walden co-wrote with other people (such as Allee Willis and guitarist Corrado "Pat" Rustici).

== Track listing ==
All songs written by Narada Michael Walden, except where noted.

1. "You're Soo Good" - 6:02
2. "I Shoulda Loved Ya" (Walden, Allee Willis, T.M. Stevens) - 6:34
3. "Lovin' You Madly" (Walden, Corrado Rustici) - 5:15
4. "Crazy for Ya" (Willis, Walden) - 3:51
5. "Tonight I'm Alright" - 5:14
6. "Why Did You Turn Me On" (Walden, Willis, Rustici) - 4:41
7. "Carry On" (Walden, Frank Martin) - 5:11
8. "The Dance of Life" - 6:33

== Personnel ==
- Narada Michael Walden – lead vocals, acoustic piano, drums, percussion, rhythm arrangements, horn arrangements
- Frank Martin – keyboards, Dyna My piano, Moog synthesizers, Prophet-5, rhythm arrangements, horn arrangements (2, 5)
- Corrado "Pat" Rustici – guitars, rhythm arrangements
- T.M. Stevens – bass, rhythm arrangements
- The "See America Horns" (1-7):
  - Marc Russo – alto saxophone, tenor saxophone, horn arrangements (1, 2, 5, 6)
  - Danny Noe – trombone, horn arrangements (1, 2, 5, 6)
  - David Grover – trumpet, horn arrangements (1, 2, 5, 6)
- Jim Gilstrap – backing vocals
- Nuhad Saba Martin – backing vocals
- Vicki Randle – backing vocals
- Carla Vaughn – backing vocals

Production

- Narada Michael Walden – producer
- Bob Clearmountain – producer, engineer, mixing
- Jeff Norman – assistant engineer
- Raymond Willard – assistant engineer
- Dennis King – mastering at Atlantic Studios (New York, NY)
- Carin Goldberg – design
- Norman Seeff – photography
