= Creation (American band) =

Creation was an American teen musical group from New York City. The band members were Sam Hellerman (drums and percussion), Raechel Rosen (lead vocals), Derek Orshan (bass, backing vocalist), Josh Shackett (rhythm guitar), and Tory Geismar (lead guitar and backing vocalist), and founding member Molly Mehlsack (lead vocals / rhythm guitar) before she moved on to other endeavors. Their only album, World Without Windows, was released in November 2005 and featured guest musician Clarence "Big Man" Clemons on one of the tracks.

It was said the idea for the band came from a cafe, the group was there. The stated goal of the group is "to help create a more peaceful world for the future, and to educate kids about multiculturalism, diversity, and peace." To help achieve that end, the band announced that all gross proceeds from their album were to go towards the We Are Family Foundation. They also worked with Building with Books and U.S. Doctors for Africa. Creation's philanthropic mission was featured in many media outlets including USA Today, Time For Kids, The Montel Williams Show, Girls' Life Magazine, and The Jewish Week.

As adults, all five members are now known as Rose & the Thorns.
