= Awakening (Narada Michael Walden album) =

Studio album by Narada Michael Walden
- Released: 1979
- Recorded: 1978–1979
- Studios: The Power Station and Electric Lady Studios (New York City, New York); Crystal Sound and Ocean Way Recording (Hollywood, California)
- Genres: Soul, R&B, disco
- Length: 40:20
- Label: Atlantic
- Producers: Narada Michael Walden (all tracks), Patrick Adams (tracks 1–4), Sonny Burke (tracks 5–7), Wayne Henderson (tracks 8–9)

Narada Michael Walden chronology
I Cry, I Smile (1977)	Awakening (1979)	The Dance of Life (1979)

Awakening is the third full-length studio release from drummer/songwriter/producer Narada Michael Walden. It was the first of two 1979 releases for the artist and featured him (once again) writing all the songs, though he co-produced each track with someone else.

== Track listing ==
- All songs written and arranged by Narada Michael Walden.
1. "Love Me Only" - 6:05
2. "I Don't Want Nobody Else (To Dance with You)" - 4:24
3. "Give Your Love a Chance" - 4:11
4. "They Want the Feeling" - 3:58
5. "Awakening Suite Part I: Childhood-Opening of the Heart" - 3:28
6. "The Awakening" - 4:30
7. "Listen to Me" - 4:54
8. "Full and Satisfied" - 3:35
9. "Will You Ever Know" - 4:59

== Personnel ==
- Narada Michael Walden – lead vocals (1, 4, 6–8), acoustic piano (1, 9), drums, vocals (2, 3, 9), organ (2), "dream" bass (2), tambourine (2), timbales (2), slapstick (2), handclaps (2), glockenspiel (3)
- Clifford Carter – Fender Rhodes (1, 3, 4), Minimoog (1), clavinet (2), Moog bass (3)
- Patrick Adams – synthesizers (1), horn and string arrangements (1, 3), "inner space" effects (2)
- Greg Phillinganes – keyboards (5), Yamaha electric grand piano (6, 7)
- Michael Boddicker – synthesizers (5)
- Reginald "Sonny" Burke – synthesizers (5), acoustic piano (6)
- Bobby Lyle – keyboards (8)
- Ken Mazur – guitars (1, 2, 4), guitar melodies (3)
- Hiram Bullock – guitar solo (1, 4), guitars (2, 3)
- Ray Gomez – lead guitar (5)
- Jay Graydon – guitars (5, 6), lead guitar (7)
- Pat Thrall – guitars (6), rhythm guitar (7)
- Carlos Santana – lead guitar (6)
- Greg Poree – acoustic guitar (7)
- Steve Beckmeier – guitars (8)
- Norbert Sloley – bass (1, 2, 4)
- Keni Burke – bass (5–7)
- Nathaniel Phillips – bass (8, 9)
- Airto Moreira – percussion (6)
- Victor Feldman – vibraphone (7), marimba (8), cabasa (8), temple block (8)
- George Young – alto saxophone (2)
- Michael Brecker – tenor saxophone (2, 3)
- Pete Christlieb – flute (9)
- Don Menza – flute (9)
- Wayne Henderson – trombone solo (7)
- Randy Brecker – trumpet (2), horn arrangements (2)
- James Decker – French horn (7, 9)
- David Duke – French horn (7, 9)
- Gayle Levant – harp (9)
- George Del Barrio – orchestra arrangements (6, 9), conductor (6, 7), string arrangements (7)
- Tawatha Agee – backing vocals (1, 4)
- Cheryl Alexander – backing vocals (1, 4)
- Patti Scialfa – backing vocals (4)
- John Bahler – backing vocals (7)
- Alex Brown – backing vocals (7, 8)
- Jim Gilstrap – backing vocals (7, 8)
- Carla Vaughn – backing vocals (7, 8)
- Angela Winbush – backing vocals (7)
- Judy Brown – backing vocals (8)

== Production ==
- Narada Michael Walden – producer (1–4), associate producer (5–9)
- Patrick Adams – associate producer (1–4)
- Sonny Burke – producer (5–7)
- Wayne Henderson – producer (8, 9)
- Bob Clearmountain – recording (1–4), mixing (1–4, 9)
- Michael Frondelli – vocal recording (1, 4)
- Jimmy Schfflett – recording (5–7)
- Allen Sides – mixing (5, 7, 8), recording (6, 8, 9)
- Dennis King – mastering at Atlantic Studios (New York, NY)
- Norman Seeff – cover photography
- David Henderson – inner sleeve photography
- Gregory Digiovine – management
