= Looking at You, Looking at Me =

Studio album by Narada Michael Walden
- Released: June 25, 1983
- Studio: The Automatt (San Francisco)
- Label: Atlantic
- Producer: Narada Michael Walden

Narada Michael Walden chronology
| Confidence (1982) | Looking at You, Looking at Me (1983) | The Nature of Things (1985) |

Singles from Looking at You, Looking at Me
- 1. "Black Boy"; 2. "Reach Out I'll Be There"

Professional ratings
Review scores
| Source | Rating |
|---|---|
| AllMusic | 2/5 stars |

Looking at You, Looking at Me is the seventh full-length studio recording from singer/songwriter/drummer/producer Narada Michael Walden. It was Walden's last album to be released by Atlantic Records and peaked at No. 51 on the Billboard Top R&B albums chart.

The album's lead single "Black Boy" failed to chart. However, the cover of "Reach Out I'll Be There" reached No. 40 on the Billboard R&B singles chart.

== Track listing ==
All tracks are written by Narada Michael Walden and Jeffrey Cohen, except where noted.

| No. | Title | Writer(s) | Length |
|---|---|---|---|
| 1. | "Reach Out I'll Be There" | Holland–Dozier–Holland | 5:56 |
| 2. | "Looking at You, Looking at Me" | Jeffrey Cohen, Preston Glass, Narada Michael Walden, Theo Martin | 4:36 |
| 3. | "Burning Up" | | 4:19 |
| 4. | "Never Wanna Be Without Your Love" (duet with Angela Bofill) | Phillip Saisse, Jim DiPrima | 4:18 |
| 5. | "Shake It Off" | | 5:12 |
| 6. | "Dream Maker" | | 4:43 |
| 7. | "Tina" | | 4:15 |
| 8. | "Ain't Nobody Ever Loved You" | | 4:44 |
| 9. | "Black Boy" | | 4:29 |
| Total length: | | | 42:32 |

== Personnel ==
As listed on the back cover of the Looking at You, Looking at Me vinyl album:

- Narada Michael Walden – lead vocals, drums, percussion (1, 4), piano, Prophet-5 (3, 5–9), horn arrangements (3, 5), timbales (8)
- David Sancious – synthesizers (1, 2), OB-X kalimba (1), Oberheim OB-X (3, 4), keyboards (3), piano (4, 5), OB-X harmonica licks (6), OB-X blues licks (7), OB-X harmonica (9)
- Mitchell Froom – Moog bells (1), gun shot (2)
- Frank Martin – synthesizers (3–5), Rhodes piano (4), string synthesizer (6, 8), organ (7)
- Mark Robertson – Mellotron (9)
- Joaquin Lievano – guitars (1, 2), guitar solo (2)
- Preston Glass – acoustic guitars (1, 2)
- Corrado Rustici – finger snaps (2), guitars (3–6, 8), 50s guitar and solo (7), acoustic guitars (9), electric guitars (9)
- Randy Jackson – bass (1–6, 8, 9), finger snaps (2), bass solo (5)
- Herman Jackson – finger snaps (2)
- Sheila Escovedo – percussion (4, 8)
- Andy Narell – steel drums solo (8)
- Marc Russo – alto saxophone (2–5, 7), alto sax solo (4, 7)
- Jerry Hey – trumpet and flugelhorn (2–5), horn arrangements (2–5)
- Chuck Findley – trumpet and flugelhorn (2–5)
- Michael Gibbs – string arrangements (2, 4, 6)
- Frankie Beverly and Maze – "Reach!" backing vocals (1)
- Jim Gilstrap – backing vocals (1–4, 6–8)
- Kelly Kool – backing vocals (1–4, 6–8), role of "Tina" (7)
- John Lehman – backing vocals (1–4, 6–8)
- Myrna Matthews – backing vocals (1–4, 6–8)
- Carla Vaughn – backing vocals (1–4, 6–8)
- Jeffrey E. Cohen – "Chief of the S.F. Fire Department" (3)
- Angela Bofill – lead vocals (4)
- Jim Gilstrap, Randy Jackson, Kelly Kool, John Lehman, Myrna Matthews, Dwayne Simmons, Carla Vaughn and Lisa Walden – handclaps on "Shake It Off"

=== Production ===
- Narada Michael Walden – producer, arrangements
- David Frazer – engineer
- Ken Kessie – basic track engineer (4)
- Maureen Droney – second engineer
- Wayne Lewis – second engineer
- Ray Pyle – second engineer
- Leslie Ann Jones – final editing
- Bob Ludwig – mastering at Masterdisk (New York, NY)
- Norman Seeff – photography
- Lynn Dreese Breslin – art direction
- Gregory Digiovine – management
- Adam's Dad Management Co. – management

== Charts ==
| Chart (1983) | Peak position |
|---|---|
| US Top R&B Albums (Billboard) | 51 |
