= Delightful, Ohio =

Unincorporated community in Ohio, U.S.

Coordinates: 41°17′10″N 80°55′30″W

Delightful is an unincorporated community in Trumbull County, in the U.S. state of Ohio.

== History ==
A post office was established at Delightful in 1880, and remained in operation until it was discontinued in 1902. The founding settlers found the town site "delightful", hence the name.
