= Garden of Love Light =

Studio album by Narada Michael Walden
- Released: November 4, 1976
- Recorded: August 21 – September 6, 1976
- Studio: Atlantic Studios (New York, NY)
- Genre: Soul, R&B, jazz fusion
- Length: 43:05
- Label: Atlantic
- Producer: Tom Dowd

Narada Michael Walden chronology
Garden of Love Light (1976)	I Cry, I Smile (1977)

Garden of Love Light is the debut solo album from R&B-soul-dance-pop songwriter/producer Narada Michael Walden. It featured nine tracks, seven which Walden wrote alone. It was produced by Tom Dowd. The single "Delightful" rose to number 81 on the R&B charts.

== Track listing ==
- All songs written by Narada Michael Walden, except where noted.
1. "White Night" (Walden, Raymond Gomez) - 4:57
2. "Garden of Love Light" - 4:55
3. "Delightful" - 4:51
4. "First Love" - 5:52
5. "Meditation" (lyrics from Sri Chinmoy) - 1:38
6. "The Sun is Dancing" - 9:29 (dedicated to Mahavishnu John McLaughlin)
7. "You Got the Soul" - 3:22
8. "Saint and the Rascal" - 4:33
9. "You Are Love" (Walden, Cynthia Anderson) - 3:12

== Personnel ==
- Narada Michael Walden - drums (1–4, 6–8), percussion, timpani (1), vocals (2, 3, 7, 9), acoustic piano (2–4, 7, 9), Fender Rhodes (7), Rhodes bass (7)
- David Sancious – keyboards (1, 6, 8), electric sitar (1), Fender Rhodes (2, 3), Hammond organ (2), Yamaha organ (2), Minimoog (2), organ (3, 4), acoustic piano (7)
- Don Muro – synthesizers (9)
- Ray Gomez – guitars (1–3, 6)
- Carlos Santana – guitars (4)
- Icarus Johnson – guitars (7)
- Jeff Beck – guitars (8)
- Will Lee – bass (1–3, 6–9), vocals (3)
- Sammy Figueroa – congas (2, 3)
- Norma Jean Bell – horns (2), saxophone (3), vocals (3, 7)
- Premik Russell Tubbs – horns (2)
- Bob Knapp – horns (2)
- Michael Gibbs – orchestra arrangements and conductor (1, 4, 5, 9)
- Perfection Light Symphony – orchestra (1, 4, 5, 9)
- Lois Colin – harp (4, 5, 9)
- Cissy Houston – vocals (2)
- The Victory Song Nightengales – vocals (2)
- Patti Scialfa – vocals (3, 7)
- Stacy Johns – vocals (5)
- Carol Shue – vocals (5)
- Tanima Cynthia Weiss – vocals (5)

== Production ==
- Tom Dowd – producer
- Dennis Mackay – engineer, mixing
- Jimmy Douglass – assistant engineer
- Randy Mason – tape operator
- Stephen W. Tayler – tape operator
- Trident Studios (London, UK) – mixing location
- Dennis King – mastering at Atlantic Studios
- Lynn Breslin – art direction
- Bob Defrin – art direction
- Steinbicker/Houghton – photography
- Gerard Huerta – front cover lettering
