= I Cry, I Smile =

Studio album by Narada Michael Walden
- Released: 1977
- Recorded: April–May 1977
- Studios: Atlantic (New York, NY)
- Genres: Soul, R&B
- Label: Atlantic
- Producer: Narada Michael Walden

Narada Michael Walden chronology
Garden of Love Light (1976)	I Cry, I Smile (1977)	Awakening (1979)

Professional ratings
Review scores
Source	Rating
AllMusic	3/5 stars

I Cry, I Smile is the second studio album by R&B/soul songwriter/producer Narada Michael Walden. Released in 1977 on Atlantic Records, it marked the first time Walden himself took on the bulk of the production duties; as stated on the back of the record jacket: "Produced by Narada Michael Walden".

== Track listing ==
- All songs written and arranged by Narada Michael Walden.
1. "I Need Your Love" - 3:41
2. "Better Man" - 4:19
3. "Soul Bird" - 4:32
4. "I Remember" - 4:30
5. "Oneness-Cry" - 4:57
6. "Mango Bop" - 4:43
7. "Rainbow-Sky" - 1:17
8. "I Cry, I Smile" - 5:46
9. "Heaven's Just a Step Ahead" - 4:31
10. "So Long" - 4:22

== Personnel ==
- Narada Michael Walden – vocals, keyboards, drums
- Clifford Carter – keyboards
- Hiram Bullock – guitars
- Ray Gomez – guitars
- Neil Jason – bass
- Sammy Figueroa – percussion
- Raphael Cruz – percussion
- Norma Jean Bell – flute, reeds
- Herbie Mann – flute, reeds
- Michael Gibbs – string arrangements and conductor
- Cheryl Alexander – backing vocals
- Elisa DeLieson – backing vocals
- Chrissy Faith – backing vocals

Production

- Narada Michael Walden – producer
- Jimmy Douglass – assistant producer, engineer
- Randy Mason – assistant engineer
- Jerry Smith – mixing at Trident Studios (London, UK)
- Steven Shore – mix assistant
- Dennis King – mastering at Atlantic Studios
- Bob Defrin – art direction
- Lynn Breslin – design
- Steinbecker/Houghton – photography
- Sri Chinmoy – liner notes
