= Clarence Clemons =

American saxophonist (1942–2011)

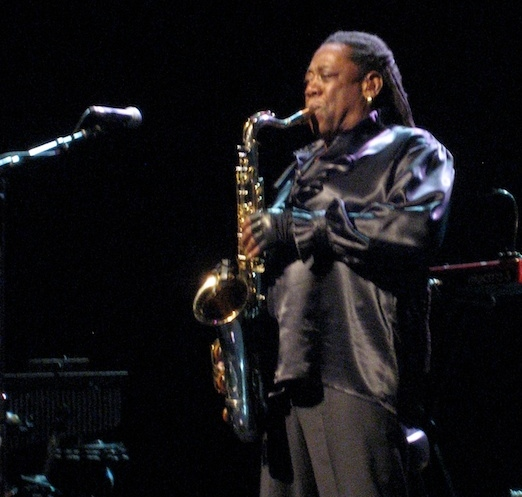
- Clemons performing in November 2009
- Born: January 11, 1942; Norfolk County, Virginia, U.S.
- Died: June 18, 2011 (aged 69); West Palm Beach, Florida, U.S.
- Other name: The Big Man
- Occupations: Musician; actor
- Years active: 1961–2011
- Spouse: Victoria Clemons (m. 2008)
- Children: 4, including Nick
- Relatives: Jake Clemons (nephew)
- Musical career
- Genres: Rock; R&B
- Instruments: Saxophone; percussion; vocals
- Formerly of: E Street Band; Ringo Starr & His All-Starr Band
- Website: clarenceclemons.com

Clarence Anicholas Clemons Jr. (January 11, 1942 – June 18, 2011), also known as The Big Man, was an American saxophonist. From 1972 until his death in 2011, he was the saxophonist for Bruce Springsteen and The E Street Band.

Clemons released several solo albums. In 1985, he had a hit single with "You're a Friend of Mine", a duet with Jackson Browne. As a guest musician, he featured on Aretha Franklin's song "Freeway of Love". As an actor, Clemons appeared in several films, including New York, New York and Bill & Ted's Excellent Adventure. He also made cameo appearances in several TV series, including Diff'rent Strokes, Nash Bridges, The Simpsons, My Wife and Kids, The Super Dave Osborne Show and The Wire.

Clemons published Big Man: Real Life & Tall Tales (2009) with his friend Don Reo. The book is a semi-fictional autobiography told in the third person.

Clemons died in 2011 at the age of 69 in West Palm Beach, Florida.

In 2014, he was posthumously inducted into the Rock and Roll Hall of Fame as a member of the E Street Band.

== Early life ==
Clarence Anicholas Clemons Jr. was born on January 11, 1942, in Norfolk County, Virginia (later the city of Chesapeake), the son of fish market owner Clarence Clemons Sr., and his wife Thelma. He was the oldest of their three children. His grandfather was a Baptist preacher and, as a result, the young Clemons grew up in a very religious environment listening to gospel music. When he was nine, his father gave him an alto saxophone as a Christmas present and paid for music lessons. He later switched to tenor saxophone and played in a high school jazz band. His uncle also influenced his early musical development when he bought him his first King Curtis album. Curtis, and his work with the Coasters in particular, would become a major influence on Clemons and led to him switching to tenor saxophone.

As a youth, Clemons also showed potential as a football player, and graduated from Crestwood High School (now Crestwood Middle) before attending Maryland State College on both music and football scholarships. At 6' 4"(193.04 cm) and 240 pounds, he played as a lineman on the same college team as Art Shell and Emerson Boozer. He tried out for the Dallas Cowboys, and was asked to try for the Cleveland Browns. However, one day before the scheduled Browns tryout he was injured in a serious car crash, which effectively ended any plans of a career in the National Football League. He would eventually be posthumously inducted into the university's Athletics Hall of Fame on February 24, 2012.

At age 18, Clemons had one of his earliest studio experiences as a musician, recording sessions with Tyrone Ashley's Funky Music Machine, a band from Plainfield, New Jersey, that included Ray Davis, Eddie Hazel and Billy Bass Nelson, all of whom later played with Parliament-Funkadelic. He also performed with Daniel Petraitis, a musician active New Jersey and Nashville, whose recording sessions featuring Clemons were eventually released in 2007 by Truth and Soul Records as Let Me Be Your Man. While at Maryland State College, Clemons also joined his first band, the Vibratones, which played James Brown covers and stayed together for about four years between 1961 and 1965. While still playing with this band, he moved to Somerset, New Jersey, where he worked as a counselor for children at the Jamesburg Training School for Boys, a youth detention center, between 1962 and 1970.

== Music career ==
=== E Street Band ===
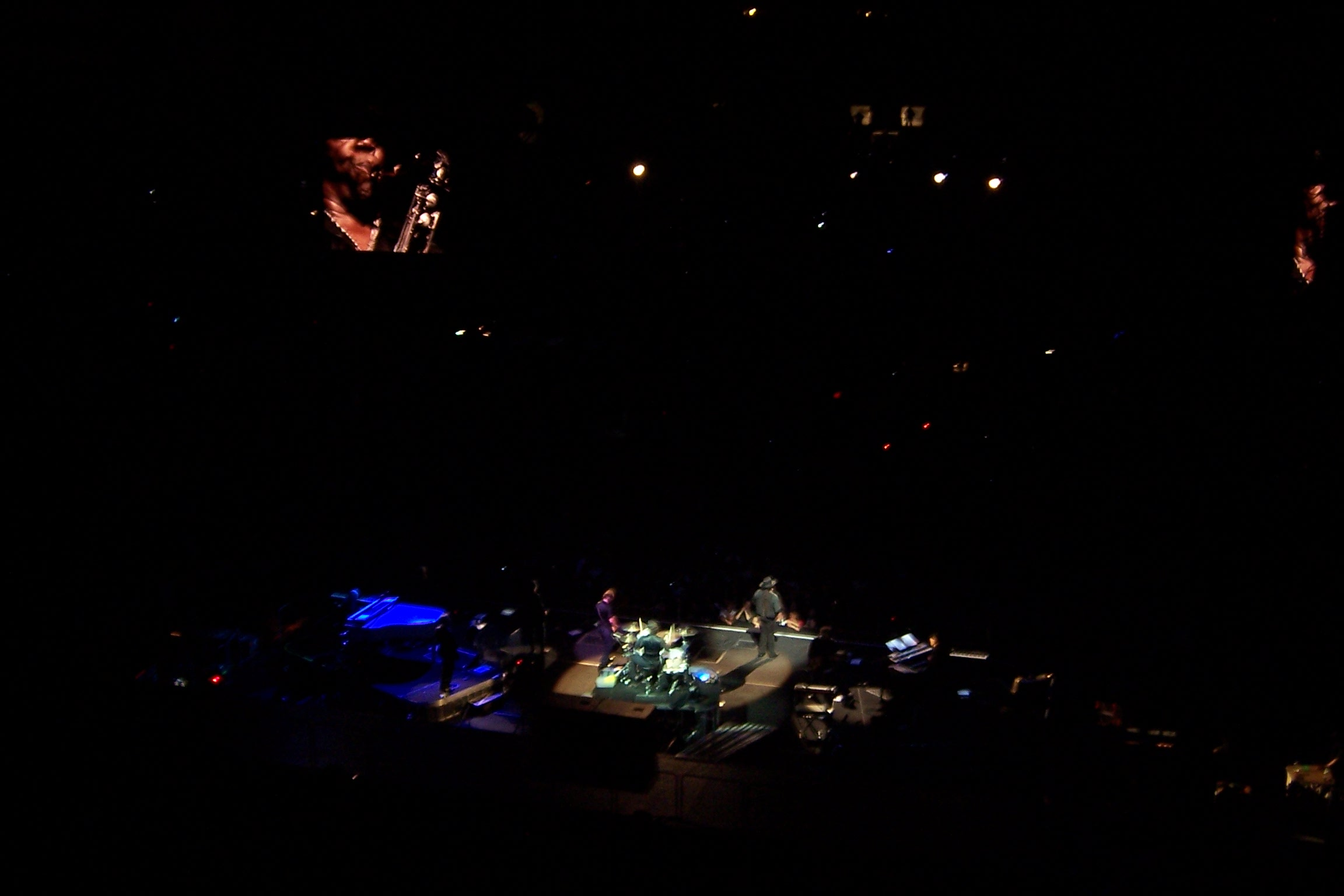
Clemons stage front with the E Street Band, playing his famous "Jungleland" saxophone solo. Nassau Coliseum, March 10, 2008.

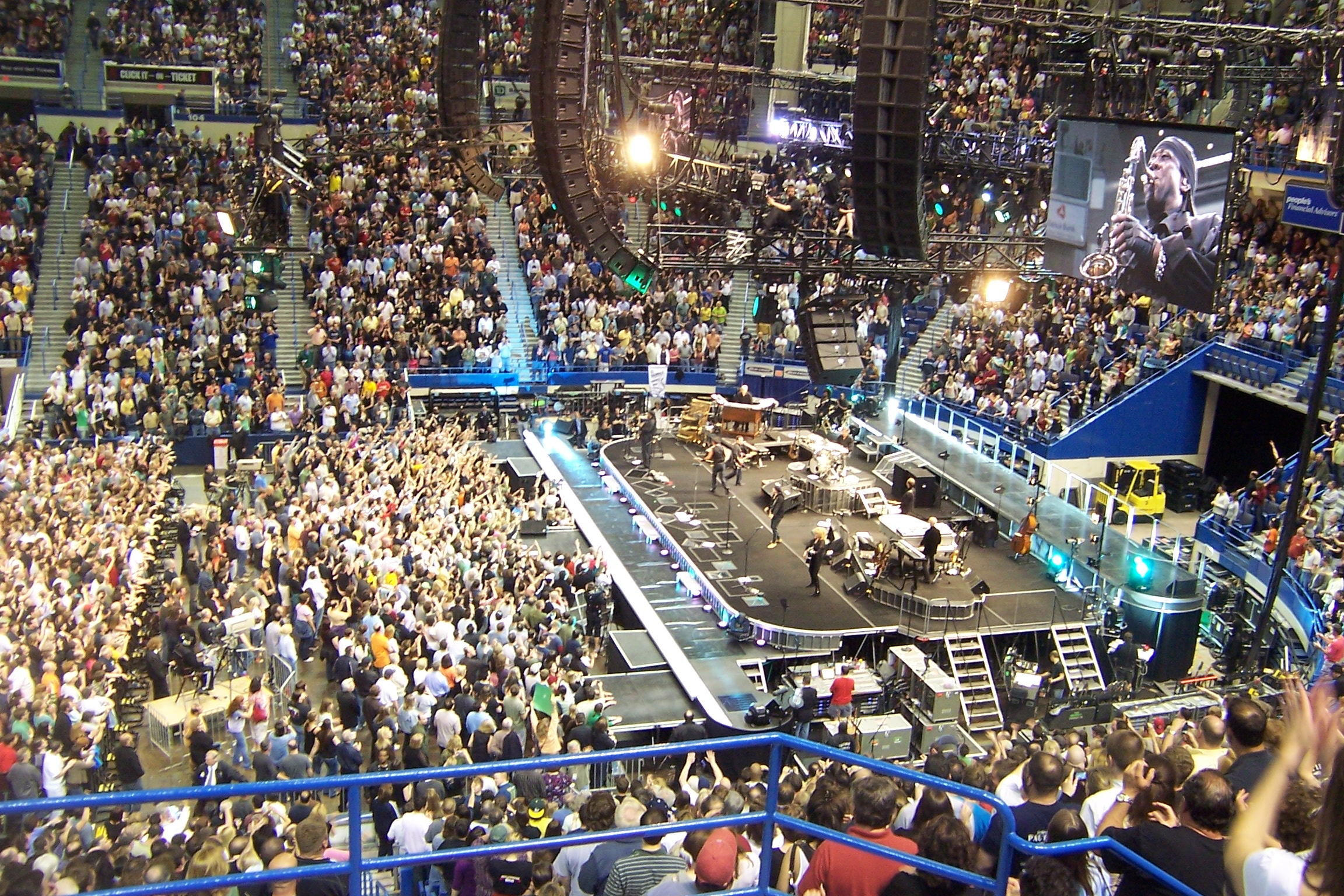
Clemons playing his "Born to Run" saxophone solo with house lights up. Hartford Civic Center, April 24, 2009.

The story of how Clemons first met Bruce Springsteen has entered into E Street Band mythology. "The E Street Shuffle" contains a monologue about how they met, and the event was also immortalized in "Tenth Avenue Freeze-Out". They allegedly met for the first time in September 1971. At the time, Clemons was playing with Norman Seldin & the Joyful Noyze at the Wonder Bar in Asbury Park, New Jersey. Seldin was a Jersey Shore musician/entrepreneur who, as well as playing piano and leading various bands, had his own record label, Selsom Records. In 1969, Clemons had recorded a self-named album with this band. In 2008, tracks from this album were reissued on an anthology, Asbury Park — Then and Now, put together by Seldin. It was Karen Cassidy, lead vocalist with the Joyful Noyze, who encouraged Clemons to check out Springsteen, who was playing with the Bruce Springsteen Band at the nearby Student Prince. Clemons recalled their meeting in various interviews:

One night we were playing in Asbury Park. I'd heard The Bruce Springsteen Band was nearby at a club called The Student Prince and on a break between sets I walked over there. On-stage, Bruce used to tell different versions of this story but I'm a Baptist, remember, so this is the truth. A rainy, windy night it was, and when I opened the door the whole thing flew off its hinges and blew away down the street. The band were on-stage, but staring at me framed in the doorway. And maybe that did make Bruce a little nervous because I just said, "I want to play with your band," and he said, "Sure, you do anything you want." The first song we did was an early version of "Spirit in the Night". Bruce and I looked at each other and didn't say anything, we just knew. We knew we were the missing links in each other's lives. He was what I'd been searching for. In one way he was just a scrawny little kid. But he was a visionary. He wanted to follow his dream. So from then on I was part of history.

However, well before this meeting, Clemons and Springsteen had moved within the same circle of musical acquaintances. Norman Seldin had managed and promoted several local bands, including the Motifs who featured Vinnie Roslin, later to play with Springsteen in Steel Mill. On April 22, 1966, Seldin had also organized a battle of the bands competition at the Matawan-Keyport Roller Drome in Matawan, New Jersey. Springsteen was among the entrants playing with his then band, the Castiles. Billy Ryan, who played lead guitar with The Joyful Noyze, also played in the Jaywalkers with Garry Tallent and Steve Van Zandt. Clemons himself had also played with Tallent in Little Melvin & The Invaders.

In July 1972, Springsteen began recording his debut album Greetings from Asbury Park, N.J. and during breaks from recording, he jammed with Clemons and the Joyful Noyze on at least two occasions at the Shipbottom Lounge in Point Pleasant, New Jersey. When Springsteen then decided to use a tenor saxophone on the songs "Blinded by the Light" and "Spirit in the Night", he called Clemons. By October Springsteen was ready to tour and promote Greetings and he put together a band featuring Clemons, Tallent, Danny Federici and Vini Lopez. Clemons played his last gig with Norman Seldin & The Joyful Noyze at the Club Plaza in Bayville, New Jersey, on October 21, 1972. Four days later Clemons made his debut with the formative E Street Band at an unadvertised, impromptu performance at The Shipbottom Lounge.

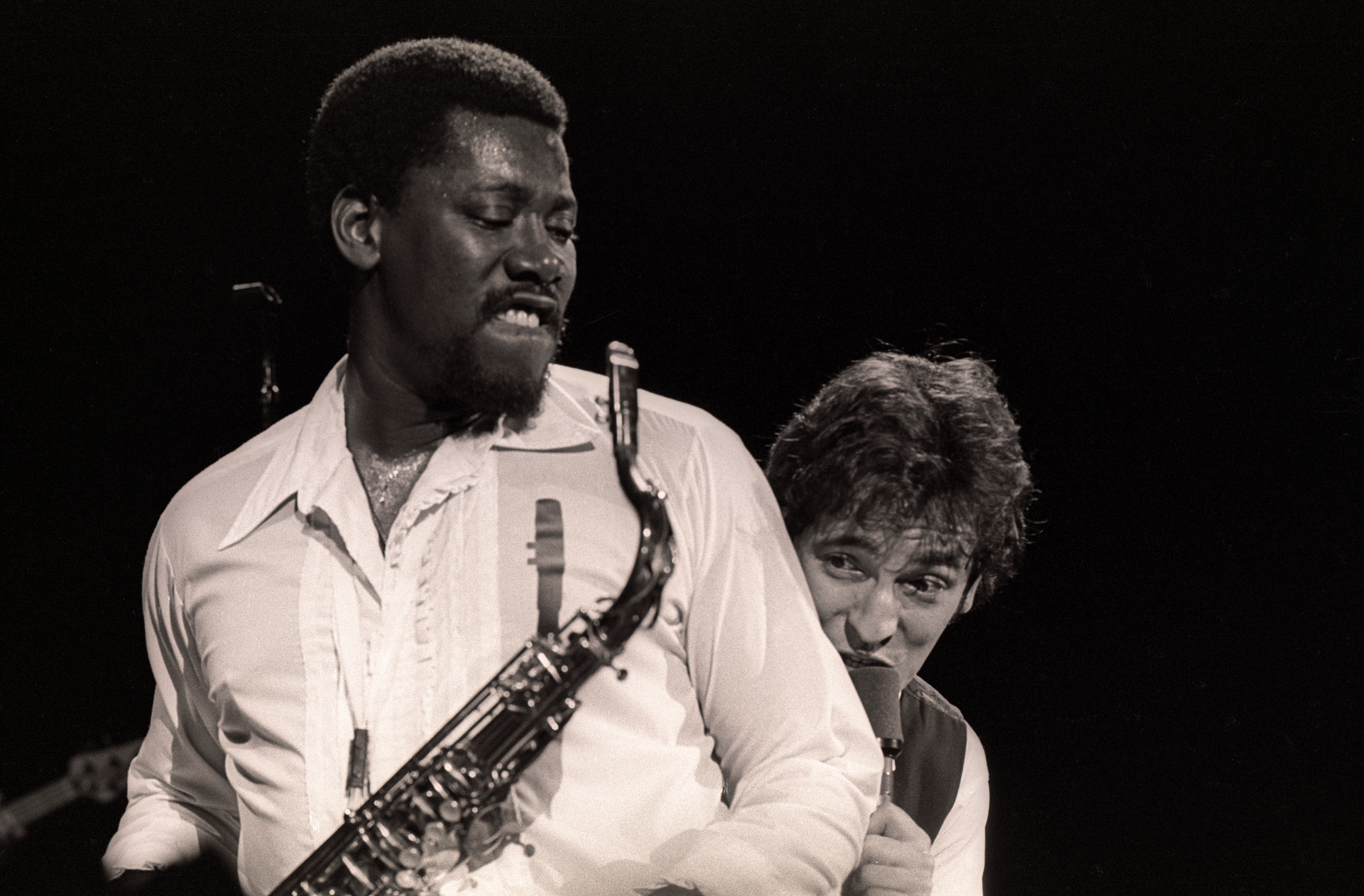
Clarence Clemons and Bruce Springsteen, Madison, Wisconsin

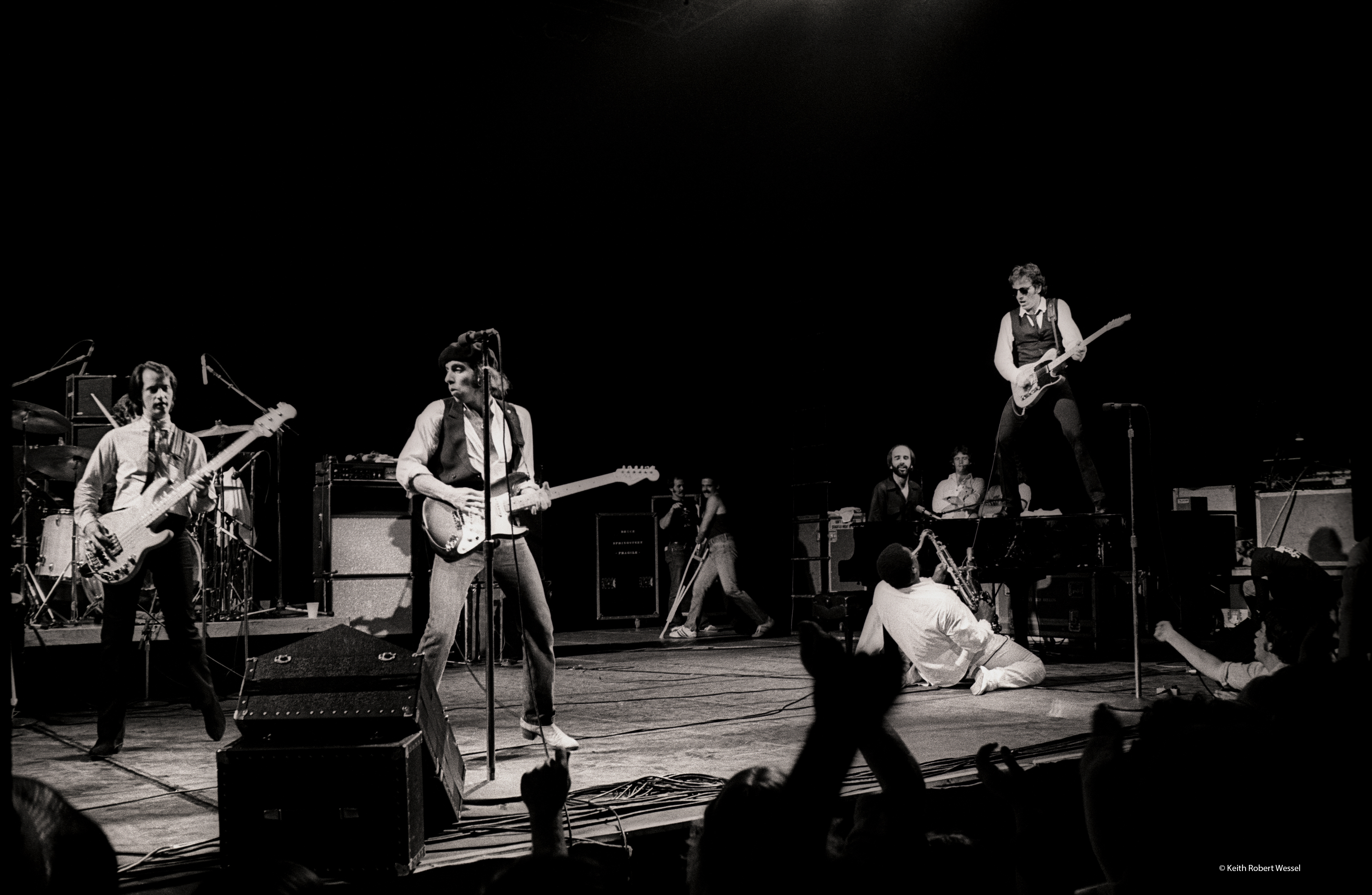
Clarence Clemons with the E Street Band, Madison, Wisconsin

Throughout the 1970s and 1980s, Clemons featured prominently on Springsteen's albums. On Born to Run he provided memorable saxophone solos on the title track, "Thunder Road", "She's the One", "Night" and "Jungleland". Darkness on the Edge of Town featured solos by Clemons on "Badlands", "The Promised Land" and "Prove It All Night". The River saw Clemons featured on songs such as "The Ties That Bind", "Sherry Darling", "I Wanna Marry You", "Drive All Night" and "Independence Day" while Born in the U.S.A. saw solos on Darlington County, "Bobby Jean" and "I'm Goin' Down".

Springsteen and other members of the band referred to Clemons as "The Big Man" due to his imposing size, as well as Clemons's stage presence and outgoing personality. At the end of shows, while recognizing members of the E Street Band, Springsteen referred to Clemons as "The Biggest Man You Ever Seen". He sometimes changed this depending on where the E Street Band performed at their 2009 concert in Glasgow he introduced Clemons as "the biggest Scotsman you've ever seen".

In April 2014, the E Street Band were inducted into the Rock and Roll Hall of Fame. Clemons' widow attended the ceremony on his behalf.

=== Solo career and other projects ===
Outside of his work with the E Street Band, Clemons recorded with many other artists and had a number of musical projects on his own. The best known of these are his 1985 vocal duet with Jackson Browne on the Top-20 hit single "You're a Friend of Mine", and his saxophone work on Aretha Franklin's 1985 Top-10 hit single "Freeway of Love". He was managed briefly in the 1980s by former Crawdaddy editor Peter Knobler, at whose wedding Clemons played with his band, Clarence Clemons & the Red Bank Rockers. During the 1980s, Clemons also owned a Red Bank, New Jersey, nightclub called Big Man's West. He toured in the first incarnation of Ringo Starr & His All-Starr Band in 1989, singing "You're a Friend of Mine" (dueting with Billy Preston) and an updated rap arrangement of "Quarter to Three".

In 1987, Clemons appeared in the HBO/Cinemax special "The Legendary Ladies of Rock and Roll", playing onstage alongside Brenda Lee and Ronnie Spector.

In the late 1980s, he developed a friendship with Jerry Garcia and played a number of concerts with the Grateful Dead, including notable appearances during their New Year's Eve concert in 1988, an AIDS benefit concert in May 1989, and a live pay-per-view broadcast of their summer solstice concert on June 21, 1989. Clemons also did a tour with the Jerry Garcia Band. One of these performances, from September 16, 1989, was officially released in 2020 as Garcia Live Volume 13.

In the mid-1990s, he recorded a Japan-only CD release called Aja and the Big Man "Get It On" with Los Angeles singer/songwriter Aja Kim. In 1992 he was involved in the sessions for the album Zoom by Alvin Lee. At this time he also recorded an instrumental record with Alan Niven producing, Peacemaker.

In the 2000s, Clemons along with producer Narada Michael Walden, put together a group called The Temple of Soul, releasing a single called "Anna". He also recorded with philanthropic teen band Creation. Clemons collaborated with Lady Gaga on the songs "Hair" and "The Edge of Glory" from her album Born This Way, providing a saxophone track and solo. In April 2011, Clemons sat in on several tunes with the Grateful Dead "spinoff" band Furthur during a concert in Boca Raton, Florida. Just days before he suffered a major stroke, he shot a music video with Lady Gaga for "The Edge of Glory".

== Acting career ==
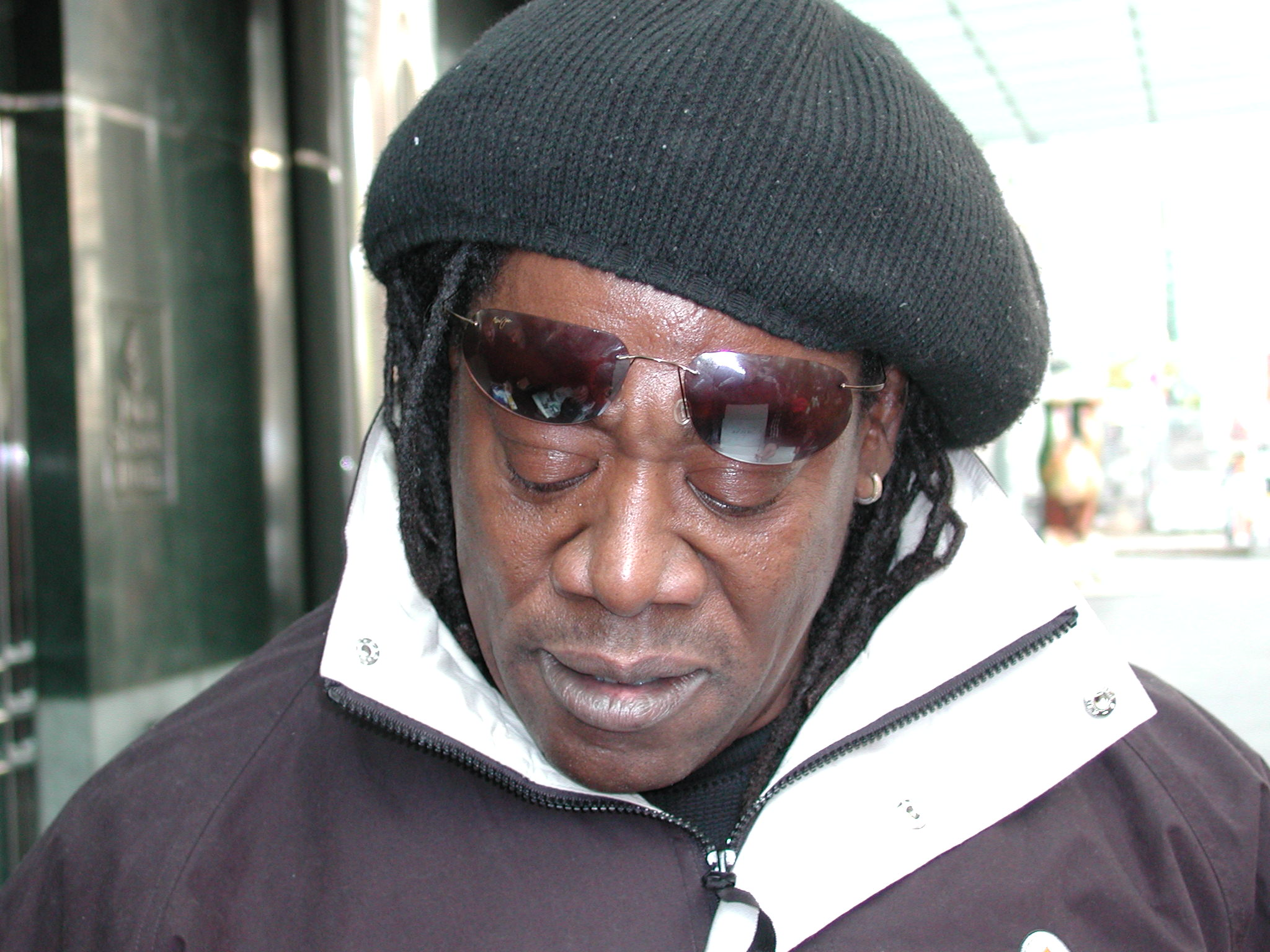
Clemons circa 2002

Clemons appeared in several movies and on television, making his screen debut in Martin Scorsese's 1977 musical film New York, New York, in which he played a trumpet player. He played one of the 'Three Most Important People In The World' in the 1989 comedy film Bill & Ted's Excellent Adventure. In 1985, Clemons was a special guest star in Diff'rent Strokes episode "So You Want to Be a Rock Star", in which he played the role of Mr. Kingsley, a young saxophonist helping Arnold Jackson to learn to play his sax.

In 1990, he co-starred in the pilot episode of Human Target, a Rick Springfield action series intended for ABC. He played the role of Jack in Swing starring opposite Lisa Stansfield and Hugo Speer, directed by Nick Mead. He appeared alongside Michael McKean and David Bowe as a miner in one episode of musician "Weird Al" Yankovic's children's television show The Weird Al Show. Clemons is a guest voice in "Grift of the Magi", a 1999 episode of The Simpsons. He made a cameo appearance in the sequel to The Blues Brothers, Blues Brothers 2000 (1999), as part of the metal section of super blues band The Louisiana Gator Boys. He appeared in the episode "Michael's Band" of Damon Wayans' television show My Wife and Kids as a musician, and performed "One Shadow In The Sun", an original composition co-written with bassist Lynn Woolever.

Clemons twice appeared as a Baltimore youth-program organizer in the HBO crime drama The Wire. He appeared in an episode of Brothers and in the "Eddie's Book" episode of 'Til Death as himself.

== Other work ==
Clemons published Big Man: Real Life & Tall Tales (2009) with his friend Don Reo. It is a semi-fictional autobiography told in the third person.

== Personal life and death ==
Clarence Clemons was married five times. He fathered four sons: Charles, Christopher, Jarod, and Clarence III (known as Nick). His nephew, Jake Clemons, was introduced as the new saxophone player of the E Street Band in 2012 after Clemons' death.

Clemons resided in Florida, where he became involved with charitable organizations. Although he considered himself a Baptist, Clemons was also associated with spiritual guru Sri Chinmoy, who gave him the spiritual name Mokshagun. His songwriting and performing are credited to Mokshagun Clarence Clemons on his 1985 album Hero.

Clemons had his knees and his hips replaced. He also had surgery for a detached retina and suffered from chronic pain. Clemons described his final tour with the E Street Band as "pure hell" due to his health challenges. Following that tour, he had his knees replaced a second time and also underwent spinal fusion surgery. In the summer of 2011, Clemens had surgery for carpal tunnel syndrome.

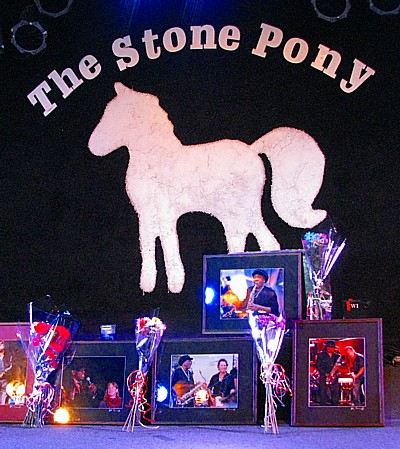
Memorial display for Clemons at The Stone Pony in Asbury Park, New Jersey, June 2011

Clemons suffered a massive stroke at his home in Florida, on June 12, 2011. While initial signs had been hopeful after his hospitalization and two subsequent brain surgeries, his condition worsened later in the week, and he died on June 18 at age 69. Upon announcement of his death, New Jersey Governor Chris Christie ordered state flags to be lowered to half staff in his honor.

Following his death, Clemons's family sued his physicians for medical malpractice, claiming that mismanagement of his medications led to his stroke.

== Tributes and legacy ==
Springsteen said of Clemons: "He carried within him a love of people that made them love him.... with Clarence at my side my band and I were able to tell a story far deeper than those simply contained in our music."

At their concert in Portsmouth, Virginia, on June 19, 2011, Phish covered "Thunder Road" as a tribute to Clemons. At an Eddie Vedder concert in Hartford, Connecticut, on June 18, 2011, upon hearing of Clemons' health struggles, Vedder wished Clemons well, and Vedder was soon notified by a sound tech that Clemons had died. Vedder later played a tribute to Clemons during the Pearl Jam song "Better Man", changing the lyrics to include, "Can't find a Bigger Man" (paying homage to Clemons' nickname "The Big Man"). During a subsequent performance on the Late Show with David Letterman, Vedder played a ukulele with "Clarence" written across the front of it. Before singing "Moment of Surrender" at the U2 concert in Anaheim on June 18, 2011, Bono paid tribute to Clemons. He read lyrics from Springsteen's "Jungleland" near the end of the song, and repeated them at the song's conclusion. Bono repeated this dedication and tribute during "Moment of Surrender" at the U2 concert in New Jersey on June 21 and again in Baltimore on June 22. Bon Jovi performed "Tenth Avenue Freeze-Out" as the first encore during their concert in Horsens on June 19, 2011. While playing that song, photos of Clemons were shown on the giant video screen behind the band. Jimmy Buffett added verses that included Clemons in "The Stories We Could Tell" during his final encore during his concert on June 21, 2011. The rest of the band left the stage and it was Buffett playing and singing alone. During the Gaslight Anthem's set at the 2011 Glastonbury Festival, frontman Brian Fallon dedicated their song "The '59 Sound" to Clemons. In October 2011, Lady Gaga paid tribute to him when she accepted the "Big Man of the Year" from Little Kids Rock. In a June 21, 2012, concert in Sydney, Gaga dedicated her song "The Edge of Glory" in which Clemons had contributed.

On July 17, 2011, a tribute concert was held at the Wonder Bar in Asbury Park, New Jersey. Springsteen performed a 45-minute set playing some of Clemons' songs. Clemons' son, Clarence III (known as Nick), opened the show with his band, The Nick Clemons Band. On October 1, 2011, a tribute to Clemons took place at the Seminole Hard Rock Hotel and Casino in Hollywood, Florida. Traditionally an annual charity event hosted by Clemons called The Classic Rock & Roll Party, the event paid tribute to Clemons' life and all he did for Home Safe, a non-profit organization helping victims of child abuse and domestic violence.

In January 2012, Clemons' hometown paid tribute with memorial concerts featuring members of the E Street Band. The concert took place at The NorVa concert hall. On July 28, 2012, in Gothenburg, Springsteen and the E Street Band performed "Jungleland" for the first time on the Wrecking Ball World Tour, with Clemons' nephew Jake Clemons playing the saxophone solo and the song being dedicated to Clemons.

A documentary about his life directed by Nick Mead, titled Clarence Clemons: Who Do I Think I Am? was released in August 2019.

== Discography ==
- Clarence Clemons & the Red Bank Rockers
  - Rescue (1983)
- Clarence Clemons
  - Hero (1985)
  - A Night With Mr. C (1989)
  - Peacemaker (1995)
- Aja and the Big Man
  - Get It On (1995)
- Clarence Clemons & Temple of Soul
  - Live in Asbury Park (2002)
  - Live in Asbury Park, Vol. 2 (2004)
  - Brothers in Arms (2008)
- Bruce Springsteen
  - Greetings from Asbury Park, N.J. (1973)
  - The Wild, the Innocent & the E Street Shuffle (1973)
  - Born to Run (1975)
  - Darkness on the Edge of Town (1978)
  - The River (1980)
  - Born in the U.S.A. (1984)
  - Live/1975–85 (1986)
  - Tunnel of Love (1987)
  - Chimes of Freedom (1988)
  - Greatest Hits (1995)
  - Blood Brothers (1996)
  - Tracks (1998)
  - 18 Tracks (1999)
  - Live in New York City (2001)
  - The Rising (2002)
  - The Essential Bruce Springsteen (2003)
  - Hammersmith Odeon London '75 (2006)
  - Magic (2007)
  - Magic Tour Highlights (2008)
  - Working on a Dream (2009)
  - The Promise (2010)
  - Wrecking Ball (2012)
  - High Hopes (2014)
- Gary U.S. Bonds
  - Dedication (1981)
  - On the Line (1982)
- Lady Gaga
  - Born This Way (2011)
- Ringo Starr & His All-Starr Band
  - Ringo Starr and His All-Starr Band (1990)
- Zucchero
  - Blues (1987)
  - Oro Incenso & Birra (1989)
  - Zucchero (1991)
  - Diamante (1994)
  - Spirito Divino (1995)
- Selected others
  - Dan Hartman: Images (1976)
  - Southside Johnny & The Asbury Jukes: I Don't Wanna Go Home (1976)
  - Pezband: Pezband (1977)
  - Ronnie Spector & The E Street Band: "Say Goodbye To Hollywood" / "Baby, Please Don't Go" (1977)
  - Scarlet Rivera: Scarlet Rivera (1977)
  - Intergalactic Touring Band: Intergalactic Touring Band (1977)
  - Carlene Carter: Two Sides to Every Woman (1979)
  - Janis Ian: Night Rains (1979)
  - Musicians United for Safe Energy: No Nukes (1979)
  - Michael Stanley Band: Heartland (1980)
  - Joan Armatrading: Me Myself I (1980)
  - Various artists: In Harmony 2 (1981)
  - Greg Lake: Greg Lake (1981)
  - Schwartz: Schwartz (1981)
  - Blue Steel: Nothing But Time (1981)
  - Little Steven & The Disciples Of Soul: Men Without Women (1982)
  - Hawks: 30 Seconds Over Otho (1982)
  - Ian Hunter: All of the Good Ones Are Taken (1983)
  - Steel Breeze: Heart on the Line (1983)
  - Silver Condor: Trouble At Home (1983)
  - Michael Stanley: Poor Side of Town (1984)
  - Aretha Franklin: Who's Zoomin' Who? (1985)
  - Narada Michael Walden: Gimme, Gimme, Gimme (1985)
  - Twisted Sister: Come Out and Play (1985)
  - Porky's Revenge Soundtrack (1985)
  - Artists United Against Apartheid: Sun City (1986)
  - Jersey Artists For Mankind: "We've Got The Love" / "Save Love, Save Life" (1986)
  - Gloria Estefan: Let It Loose (1987)
  - Various artists: A Very Special Christmas (1987)
  - Narada Michael Walden: Divine Emotions (1988)
  - The Four Tops: Indestructible (1988)
  - Todd Rundgren: Nearly Human (1989)
  - Herman Brood: Freeze (1990)
  - Home Alone 2: Lost in New York Soundtrack (1992)
  - Lisa Stansfield et al.: Swing – Original Motion Picture Soundtrack (1999)
  - Joe Cocker: Unchain My Heart (1990)
  - Peter Maffay: 38317 (1991)
  - Nils Lofgren: Silver Lining (1991)
  - Alvin Lee: Zoom (1992)
  - Roy Orbison: King of Hearts (1992)
  - Jim Carroll: A World Without Gravity: Best of The Jim Carroll Band (1993)
  - Dave Koz: Lucky Man (1993)
  - Great White: Sail Away (1994)
  - Luther Vandross: This is Christmas (1995)
  - Craig and Co.: My Newish Jewish Discovery (1997)
  - Various artists: Humanary Stew – A Tribute to Alice Cooper (1999)
  - Nick Clemons Band: In the Sunlight (2001)
  - Creation: World Without Windows (2005)
  - Bruce Benson: A Healing Prayer (2007)
  - Tyrone Ashley's Funky Music Machine: Let Me Be Your Man (2007)
  - Stormin' Norman & Friends: Asbury Park — Then And Now (2008)
  - Jerry Garcia Band: Garcia Live Volume 13 (2020)

== Filmography ==
=== Film ===
- New York, New York (1977)
  - Cecil Powell
- Bill & Ted's Excellent Adventure (1989)
  - One of the Three Most Important People in the World
- Fatal Instinct (1993)
  - Clarence
- Blues Brothers 2000 (1998)
  - The Louisiana Gator Boys
- Swing (1999)
  - Jack

=== Television ===
- Diff'rent Strokes
  - Mr. Kingsley: "So You Want to Be a Rock Star" (1985)
- Jake and the Fatman
  - Blue Danny Boyd: "Why Can't You Behave?" (1989)
- The Flash (1990)
  - Darrell Hennings: "Honor Among Thieves" (1990)
- Nash Bridges
  - Big Barry in three episodes : "25 Hours of Christmas", "Aloha Nash" and "Javelin Catcher" (1996)
- The Sentinel
  - Workman: "Dead Drop" (1997)
- The Weird Al Show
  - Miner: "Mining Accident" (1997)
- Viper
  - Leo Duquesne: "The Getaway" (1998)
- Penn & Teller's Sin City Spectacular
  - one episode (1998)
- The Simpsons
  - Narrator: "Grift of the Magi" (1999)
- My Wife and Kids
  - Johnny Watson: "Michael's Band" (2003)
- The Wire
  - Roman: "Moral Midgetry" and "Hamsterdam" (2004)
- 'Til Death
  - Himself : "Eddie's Book" (2009)

=== Music videos ===
- "You're a Friend of Mine" With Jackson Browne (1985)
- "The Edge of Glory" by Lady Gaga (2011)

== See also ==
- List of saxophonists
