= Narada Michael Walden =

American musician (born 1952)

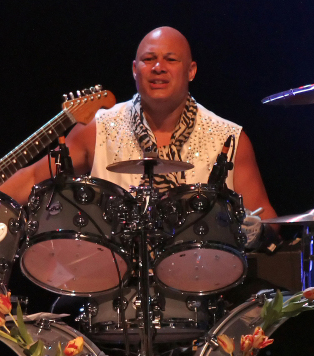
- Walden performing with Jeff Beck in 2011

Background information
- Born: Michael Walden; April 23, 1952 (age 74); Kalamazoo, Michigan, U.S.
- Genres: Jazz; R&B; disco; soul; funk; jazz fusion; rock
- Occupations: Musician; songwriter; record producer
- Instruments: Drums; keyboards; vocals
- Years active: 1971–present
- Labels: Atlantic, Reprise/Warner Bros., Tarpan
- Formerly of: Mahavishnu Orchestra; Weather Report; Jeff Beck; Journey
- Website: naradamichaelwalden.com

Narada Michael Walden (/ˈnɑːrədə/ NAH-rə-də; Michael Walden; born April 23, 1952) is an American musician, singer, songwriter and record producer. He began his career as a drummer, working primarily in the jazz fusion realm, appearing with John McLaughlin and the Mahavishnu Orchestra, Chick Corea, Jaco Pastorius, Tommy Bolin, Jeff Beck, Wayne Shorter and Weather Report, and Allan Holdsworth. After being mentored by Quincy Jones, he transitioned into a role as a songwriter and producer, working in the 1980s and 1990s with numerous R&B acts such as Whitney Houston, Aretha Franklin, Stacy Lattisaw, Angela Bofill, Jermaine Stewart, Tevin Campbell and Mariah Carey, as well as other singers across a number of genres. In 2020, he became the drummer of Journey replacing Steve Smith. In 2021, he became one of two drummers in the band alongside the returning Deen Castronovo prior to leaving in 2022. He appears on the band's album Freedom (2022), having co-produced and played on the album before his departure.

== Biography ==
Video of Narada Michael Walden recording a drum groove for Italian artist Zucchero Fornaciari for the 1986 album Rispetto.

Walden was born in Plainwell, Michigan. He attended Western Michigan University in Kalamazoo, Michigan, from 1970 to 1972.

Walden played with rock bands in Miami after he graduated from college. He was a member of the second incarnation of the Mahavishnu Orchestra from 1974 to 1976, playing drums and providing vocals. Atlantic released his first album, Garden of Love Light, in 1977, with a single that reached the R&B chart. The album was followed by I Cry I Smile and The Awakening. The latter album reached No. 15 on the R&B chart. Walden's singles continued to be popular in R&B during the 1980s including a duet with Patti Austin and an appearance on the soundtrack of the movie Bright Lights, Big City.

He built his studio in 1985 and produced music for The Temptations, Stacy Lattisaw, Aretha Franklin, Angela Bofill, Lisa Fischer, Sister Sledge, Herbie Hancock, Patti Austin, Whitney Houston, Clarence Clemons, George Benson, Sheena Easton, Kenny G, Lionel Richie, Al Jarreau, and Mariah Carey.

Walden has been nominated for eight Grammy Awards and won three: Best R&B Song for "Freeway of Love" (1985); Producer of the Year, Non-Classical (1987); and Album of the Year for The Bodyguard: Original Soundtrack Album (1993).

== Personal life ==
Walden's first marriage was to ASCAP 1988 Honors winner, writer/performer (Anukampa) Lisa Marie Coles in Hempstead, New York in 1978 until divorcing in California in 1992. The couple co-wrote hit songs for Stacy Lattisaw, Sister Sledge, Angela Bofill, Wanda Walden and Aretha Franklin.

In 2013, Walden married former Catholic school teacher Katie Mersereau at Marin Civic Center in San Rafael, California. The couple have two daughters, Kelly and Kayla, and a son, Michael. The pair worked together on Walden's album Evolution, released in 2015, with Mersereau credited as providing backing vocals on four tracks and writing one song, under her married name, Katie Mersereau-Walden.

Walden was given the name Narada by guru Sri Chinmoy, of whom he was a devotee.

== Discography ==
=== Albums ===
Year	Album	Label	Peak chart positions		
Year	Album	Label	US	US R&B	UK
1976	Garden of Love Light	Atlantic Records	—	—	—
1977	I Cry, I Smile	Atlantic Records	—	—	—
1979	Awakening	Atlantic Records	103	15	—
1979	The Dance of Life	Atlantic Records	74	9	—
1980	Victory	Atlantic Records	103	21	—
1982	Confidence	Atlantic Records	135	30	—
1983	Looking at You, Looking at Me	Atlantic Records	—	51	—
1985	The Nature of Things	Warner Bros.	—	—	—
1988	Divine Emotion	Reprise	—	67	60
1995	Sending Love to Everyone	EMI	—	—	—
2013	Thunder 2013	Tarpan	—	—	—
2015	Evolution	Tarpan	—	—	—
"—" denotes releases that did not chart or were not released in that territory.

=== Singles ===
Year	Single	Peak chart positions			
Year	Single	US	US R&B	US Dance	UK
1977	"Delightful"	—	81	—	—
1979	"Give Your Love a Chance"	—	80	—	—
1979	"I Don't Want Nobody Else (To Dance with You)"	47	9	64	—
1979	"I Shoulda Loved Ya"	66	4	8	8
1980	"Tonight I'm Alright"	—	35	8	34
1980	"The Real Thang"	—	22	25	—
1981	"I Want You"	—	46	25	—
1982	"Summer Lady"	—	39	—	—
1982	"You're #1"	—	19	—	—
1983	"Reach Out (I'll Be There)"	—	40	19	—
1985	"Gimme, Gimme, Gimme"	—	39	—	87
1985	"The Nature of Things"	—	82	21	—
1988	"Divine Emotions"	—	21	1	8
1988	"Can't Get You Outta My Head"	—	—	—	93
1988	"Wild Thing"	—	97	—	—
"—" denotes releases that did not chart or were not released in that territory.

== Soundtracks ==
- Perfect (1985)
- 9½ Weeks (1986)
- Innerspace (1987)
- Mannequin (1987)
- Bright Lights, Big City (1988)
- Licence to Kill (1989)
- The Bodyguard (1992)
- Free Willy (1993)
- Crooklyn (1994)
- Jason's Lyric (1994)
- The Associate (1996)
- Now and Again (1999–2000)

== Other collaborations ==
=== As drummer ===
- Mahavishnu Orchestra – Apocalypse (1974), Visions of the Emerald Beyond (1975), Inner Worlds (1976)
- Tommy Bolin – "Marching Powder" on Teaser (1975)
- Chick Corea – My Spanish Heart (1976)
- Jeff Beck – Wired (1976)
- Alphonso Johnson – Moonshadows (1976)
- Nova – Vimana (1976)
- Allan Holdsworth – Velvet Darkness (1976)
- Jaco Pastorius – "Come On, Come Over" on Jaco Pastorius (1976)
- Weather Report – "Black Market" and "Cannon Ball" on Black Market (1976)
- James Mason – Rhythm of Life (1977)
- John McLaughlin – Johnny McLaughlin: Electric Guitarist (1978)
- Robert Fripp – "Breathless", "NY3", "I've Had Enough of You" on Exposure (1979)
- Carlos Santana – Oneness: Silver Dreams – Golden Reality (1979)
- Teena Marie - "Out On A Limb (Starchild)" (1984)
- Zucchero Fornaciari – Rispetto (1986)
- Journey – Freedom (2022)

=== As producer ===
- Stacy Lattisaw – Let Me Be Your Angel (1980), "Jump to the Beat" (1980), With You (1981), Sneakin' Out (1982), Sixteen (1983) and Perfect Combination (with Johnny Gill; 1984)
- Sister Sledge – All American Girls (1981)
- Carl Carlton – "The Bad CC" (1982)
- Angela Bofill – "Something About You" (1981), "Too Tough" (1983), "Tonight I Give In" (1983), "I'm on Your Side" (1983)
- San Francisco 49ers - "We Are the 49ers" (1984, rereleased in 2020 for the team's appearance in Super Bowl LIV)
- Clarence Clemons – Hero (1985)
- Aretha Franklin – Who's Zoomin' Who? (1985), Aretha (1986), Through the Storm (1989), "Everyday People" (1991), A Rose Is Still a Rose (1998)
- Whitney Houston – "How Will I Know" (1985), Whitney (1987), "One Moment in Time" (1988), I'm Your Baby Tonight (1990), "I'm Every Woman" (1992)
- Dionne Warwick – "No One There (To Sing Me a Love Song)" from Friends (1985)
- George Benson – "Kisses in the Moonlight" and "While the City Sleeps" from While the City Sleeps... (1986)
- Sheena Easton – "So Far, So Good" (1986) from About Last Night and No Sound But a Heart and "Till Death Do Us Part" from My Cherie (1995)
- Luba – "How Many" (1986)
- Jermaine Stewart – "We Don't Have to Take Our Clothes Off" (1986)
- Pointer Sisters – "Be There" (1987)
- Starship – "Nothing's Gonna Stop Us Now" (1987)
- Yōko Oginome – Verge of Love (1988)
- Regina Belle – "Baby Come to Me" (1989)
- Natalie Cole – "I Do" (1989)
- Gladys Knight – "Licence to Kill" (1989)
- Patti LaBelle – "Still in Love" (1989)
- Eddie Murphy – "Put Your Mouth on Me" and "Till the Money's Gone" from So Happy (1989)
- Pia Zadora – "Pia Z" (1989)
- Mariah Carey – "Vision of Love" (1990), "I Don't Wanna Cry" (1991)
- Tevin Campbell – "Tell Me What You Want Me to Do" (1991)
- Lisa Fischer – "How Can I Ease the Pain" (1991)
- Shanice Wilson – "I Love Your Smile" and "I Hate to Be Lonely" from Inner Child (1991), "Love Is the Gift" (2000) from The Bouncer
- Al Jarreau – Heaven and Earth (1992)
- Milira – "One Man Woman" (1992)
- Elton John & Kiki Dee – "True Love" (1993)
- Mica Paris – "Whisper a Prayer" (1993)
- Michelle Gayle – "Sweetness", "Freedom", "Happy Just to Be with You", "Baby Don't Go", "All Night Long" from the self titled album Michelle Gayle (1994)
- Al Green – "Your Heart's in Good Hands" (1995)
- Diana Ross – Take Me Higher (1995)
- Taral Hicks – "Whoopty Whoop", "Don't Let the Feelin' Go Away", "I Wish You Were Here" from This Time (1997)
- Steve Winwood – Junction Seven (1997)
- Don Novello as Father Guido Sarducci and Cat McLean – "Everybody's Free to Wear Camouflage" (1999)
- The Temptations – Awesome (2001)
- Ray Charles – Genius & Friends (2005)
- LaToya London – "Every Part of Me", "Learn to Breathe" and "State of My Heart" from Love & Life (2005)
- Brian Evans – "At Fenway" (2011)
- Sydney Brown – "Love Is Stronger than Smoke and Fire" (2018)
- Santana – "Whiter Shade of Pale", "Song for Cindy" (2021)
- Journey – Freedom (2022)
- Ukrainian smooth jazz singer Shaxa (Shakhsanem Abraham) – “Never been higher”. Higher (Sted - E & Hybrid Heights Remix)
