= List of songs in Beat Saber =

Beat Saber's song list

The following is a list of songs available in Beat Saber.

Album	Song	Artist	Release date	Ref.
Original Soundtrack Vol. 1	$100 Bills	Jaroslav Beck	May 1, 2018	
Original Soundtrack Vol. 1	Balearic Pumping	Jaroslav Beck	May 1, 2018	
Original Soundtrack Vol. 1	Beat Saber	Jaroslav Beck	May 1, 2018	
Original Soundtrack Vol. 1	Breezer	Jaroslav Beck	May 1, 2018	
Original Soundtrack Vol. 1	Commercial Pumping	Jaroslav Beck	May 1, 2018	
Original Soundtrack Vol. 1	Country Rounds (Sqeepo Remix)	Jaroslav Beck, Kings & Folk, Sqeepo	May 1, 2018	
Original Soundtrack Vol. 1	Escape (ft. Summer Haze)	Jaroslav Beck, Summer Haze	May 1, 2018	
Original Soundtrack Vol. 1	Legend (ft. Backchat)	Jaroslav Beck, Crispin, Backchat	May 1, 2018	
Original Soundtrack Vol. 1	Lvl Insane	Jaroslav Beck	May 1, 2018	
Original Soundtrack Vol. 1	Turn Me On (ft. Tiny C)	Jaroslav Beck, Tiny C	May 1, 2018	
Original Soundtrack Vol. 2	Be There For You	Sedliv	November 21, 2018	
Original Soundtrack Vol. 2	Elixia	Mord Fustang	November 21, 2018	
Original Soundtrack Vol. 2	I Need You	Megaphonix	November 21, 2018	
Original Soundtrack Vol. 2	Rum n' Bass	Boom Kitty	November 21, 2018	
Original Soundtrack Vol. 2	Unlimited Power	Jaroslav Beck	November 21, 2018	
Original Soundtrack Vol. 3	Burning Sands	Boom Kitty	August 29, 2019	
Original Soundtrack Vol. 3	Full Charge	Pixl	August 29, 2019	
Original Soundtrack Vol. 3	Give A Little Love	Pegboard Nerds	August 29, 2019	
Original Soundtrack Vol. 3	Immortal	Slippy	August 29, 2019	
Original Soundtrack Vol. 3	Origins	Jaroslav Beck	August 29, 2019	
Original Soundtrack Vol. 3	Reason for Living	Morgan Page	August 29, 2019	
Original Soundtrack Vol. 4	Into The Dream	Jaroslav Beck	March 18, 2021	
Original Soundtrack Vol. 4	It Takes Me	Boom Kitty, Waylon Reavis	March 18, 2021	
Original Soundtrack Vol. 4	Ludicrous+ (Note: Stylized in all caps.)	Jaroslav Beck	March 18, 2021	
Original Soundtrack Vol. 4	Spin Eternally	Camellia	March 18, 2021	
Original Soundtrack Vol. 5	$1.78	Schwank	March 8, 2022	
Original Soundtrack Vol. 5	Curtains (All Night Long)	Eewk	March 8, 2022	
Original Soundtrack Vol. 5	Final-Boss-Chan	Camellia	March 8, 2022	
Original Soundtrack Vol. 5	Firestarter	Tanger	March 8, 2022	
Original Soundtrack Vol. 5	I Wanna Be A Machine	The Living Tombstone	March 8, 2022	
Original Soundtrack Vol. 5	Magic	Jaroslav Beck, Meredith Bull	March 8, 2022	
Original Soundtrack Vol. 6	Heavy Weight	Lindsey Stirling	December 5, 2023	
Original Soundtrack Vol. 6	Lift Off	Far Out	December 5, 2023	
Original Soundtrack Vol. 6	Power of the Saber Blade	DragonForce	December 5, 2023	
Original Soundtrack Vol. 6	Tempo-Katana	Camellia	December 5, 2023	
Original Soundtrack Vol. 6	Cathedral	Boom Kitty	December 11, 2023	
Original Soundtrack Vol. 7	Damage	F.O.O.L	June 4, 2024	
Original Soundtrack Vol. 7	Lustre	Camellia	June 4, 2024	
Original Soundtrack Vol. 7	The Master	Teminite, Boom Kitty	June 4, 2024	
Original Soundtrack Vol. 7	Untamed	Lindsey Stirling	June 4, 2024	
Original Soundtrack Vol. 7	World Wide Web	Nitro Fun	June 4, 2024	
Original Soundtrack Vol. 8	Badly (ft. Vivi Zena)	Camellia, Vivi Zena	November 26, 2025	
Original Soundtrack Vol. 8	Dragon Smash Goblin (ft. Nekrogoblikon)	DragonForce, Nekrogoblikon	November 26, 2025	
Original Soundtrack Vol. 8	Monday Not Sick Anymore	Lindsey Stirling	November 26, 2025	
Original Soundtrack Vol. 8	Overload	Auvic	November 26, 2025	
Original Soundtrack Vol. 8	Starlight	Juu (Note: Stylized in lowercase.), Dark Cat	November 26, 2025	
Original Soundtrack Vol. 8	The Master II: Blades of Chaos	Teminite, Boom Kitty	November 26, 2025	
Original Soundtrack Vol. 9	Flameblade	Camellia	November 12, 2026	
Original Soundtrack Vol. 9	LFG	Confetti	November 12, 2026	
Original Soundtrack Vol. 9	Memory Marker	E_ku	November 12, 2026	
Original Soundtrack Vol. 9	Nostalgia is a Curse	Star Slinger	November 12, 2026	
Original Soundtrack Vol. 9	One of Us	PineappleCiti (Note: Word "Pineapple" stylized in lowercase. Word "Citi" stylized in uppercase.)	November 12, 2026	
Original Soundtrack Vol. 9	Signal Jammer	Eewk	November 12, 2026	
Original Soundtrack Vol. 9	Purr	Azazal	November 12, 2026	
Extras	$100 Bills (Camellia's "$215-step" Remix)	Jaroslav Beck, Camellia	June 14, 2022	
Extras	Angel Voices	Virtual Self	July 19, 2018	
Extras	Crab Rave	Noisestorm	April 1, 2019	
Extras	Danger	Teminite, Boom Kitty	May 15, 2025	
Extras	Escape Remix	Jaroslav Beck, Tokyo Machine	June 14, 2022	
Extras	FitBeat	Jaroslav Beck	April 9, 2020	
Extras	One Hope (ft. David Binney)	Knower, David Binney	December 14, 2018	
Extras	Pop/Stars	K/DA	December 21, 2018	
Extras	Spooky Beat	Jaroslav Beck	October 25, 2021	
Extras	Killshot	Boom Kitty, MDK	May 28, 2026	
Extras	Astral Blossom	Skybreak, Daeya	May 28, 2026	
Extras	Phantom Fangs	Zakka G	May 28, 2026	
Extras	Gone For Good	Haywyre	July 30, 2026	
Camellia	Cycle Hit	Kasai Harcores	July 25, 2019	
Camellia	Crystallized	Camellia	July 25, 2019	
Camellia	What the Cat!?	Camellia	July 25, 2019	
Camellia	Exit this Earth's Atomosphere	Camellia	January 29, 2020	
Camellia	Ghost	Camellia	January 29, 2020	
Camellia	Light it Up (Note: Stylized as "Light it up".)	Camellia	January 29, 2020	
Monstercat Vol. 1	Boundless	Aero Chord	March 14, 2019	
Monstercat Vol. 1	Emoji VIP	Pegboard Nerds	March 14, 2019	
Monstercat Vol. 1	Epic	Tokyo Machine	March 14, 2019	
Monstercat Vol. 1	Feeling Stronger	Muzz, Charlotte Colley	March 14, 2019	
Monstercat Vol. 1	Overkill	Riot	March 14, 2019	
Monstercat Vol. 1	Rattlesnake	Rogue	March 14, 2019	
Monstercat Vol. 1	Stronger (feat. Emel)	Stonebank, Emel	March 14, 2019	
Monstercat Vol. 1	This Time	Kayzo	March 14, 2019	
Monstercat Vol. 1	Till It's Over	Tristam	March 14, 2019	
Monstercat Vol. 1	We Won't Be Alone (feat. Laura Brehm)	Feint, Laura Brehm	March 14, 2019	
Imagine Dragons	Bad Liar	Imagine Dragons	June 10, 2019 (updated February 28, 2023)	
Imagine Dragons	Believer	Imagine Dragons	June 10, 2019 (updated February 28, 2023)	
Imagine Dragons	Digital	Imagine Dragons	June 10, 2019 (updated February 28, 2023)	
Imagine Dragons	It's Time	Imagine Dragons	June 10, 2019 (updated February 28, 2023)	
Imagine Dragons	Machine	Imagine Dragons	June 10, 2019 (updated February 28, 2023)	
Imagine Dragons	Natural	Imagine Dragons	June 10, 2019 (updated February 28, 2023)	
Imagine Dragons	Radioactive	Imagine Dragons	June 10, 2019 (updated February 28, 2023)	
Imagine Dragons	Thunder	Imagine Dragons	June 10, 2019 (updated February 28, 2023)	
Imagine Dragons	Warriors	Imagine Dragons	June 10, 2019 (updated February 28, 2023)	
Imagine Dragons	Whatever It Takes	Imagine Dragons	June 10, 2019 (updated February 28, 2023)	
Imagine Dragons	Bones	Imagine Dragons	February 28, 2023	
Imagine Dragons	Enemy	Imagine Dragons, JID	February 28, 2023	
Panic! at the Disco	Emperor's New Clothes	Panic! at the Disco	October 4, 2019 (updated March 30, 2023)	
Panic! at the Disco	The Greatest Show	Panic! at the Disco	October 4, 2019 (updated March 30, 2023)	
Panic! at the Disco	High Hopes	Panic! at the Disco	October 4, 2019 (updated March 30, 2023)	
Panic! at the Disco	Victorious	Panic! at the Disco	October 4, 2019 (updated March 30, 2023)	
Panic! at the Disco	Crazy = Genius	Panic! at the Disco	March 30, 2023	
Panic! at the Disco	Dancing's Not A Crime	Panic! at the Disco	March 30, 2023	
Panic! at the Disco	Hey Look Ma, I Made It	Panic! at the Disco	March 30, 2023	
Panic! at the Disco	Say Amen (Saturday Night)	Panic! at the Disco	March 30, 2023	
Panic! at the Disco	Sugar Soaker	Panic! at the Disco	March 30, 2023	
Panic! at the Disco	Viva Las Vengeance	Panic! at the Disco	March 30, 2023	
Monstercat X Rocket League	Glide	Stephen Walking	November 7, 2019	
Monstercat X Rocket League	Luv U Need U	Slushii	November 7, 2019	
Monstercat X Rocket League	Play	Tokyo Machine	November 7, 2019	
Monstercat X Rocket League	Rock It	Tokyo Machine	November 7, 2019	
Monstercat X Rocket League	Shiawase	Dion Timmer	November 7, 2019	
Monstercat X Rocket League	Test Me	Slushii, Dion Timmer	November 7, 2019	
Green Day	American Idiot	Green Day	December 13, 2019	
Green Day	Boulevard of Broken Dreams	Green Day	December 13, 2019	
Green Day	Father of All...	Green Day	December 13, 2019	
Green Day	Holiday	Green Day	December 13, 2019	
Green Day	Fire, Ready, Aim	Green Day	December 13, 2019	
Green Day	Minority	Green Day	December 13, 2019	
Timbaland	Dumb Thingz	Kaydence, Timbaland	March 26, 2020	
Timbaland	Famous (ft. Jake Davis)	Bruno Martini, Timbaland	March 26, 2020	
Timbaland	Has a Meaning	sid tipton, Timbaland	March 26, 2020	
Timbaland	What I Like	Karra, Nash Overstreet, Common Strangers	March 26, 2020	
Timbaland	While We're Young	Wavezswavesz	March 26, 2020	
Linkin Park	Bleed It Out	Linkin Park	August 17, 2020 (updated October 5, 2023)	
Linkin Park	Breaking the Habit	Linkin Park	August 17, 2020 (updated October 5, 2023)	
Linkin Park	Faint	Linkin Park	August 17, 2020 (updated October 5, 2023)	
Linkin Park	Given Up	Linkin Park	August 17, 2020 (updated October 5, 2023)	
Linkin Park	In the End	Linkin Park	August 17, 2020 (updated October 5, 2023)	
Linkin Park	New Divide	Linkin Park	August 17, 2020 (updated October 5, 2023)	
Linkin Park	Numb	Linkin Park	August 17, 2020 (updated October 5, 2023)	
Linkin Park	One Step Closer	Linkin Park	August 17, 2020 (updated October 5, 2023)	
Linkin Park	Papercut	Linkin Park	August 17, 2020 (updated October 5, 2023)	
Linkin Park	Somewhere I Belong	Linkin Park	August 17, 2020 (updated October 5, 2023)	
Linkin Park	What I've Done	Linkin Park	August 17, 2020 (updated October 5, 2023)	
BTS	Blood Sweat & Tears	BTS	November 12, 2020	
BTS	Boy With Luv (Feat. Halsey)	BTS	November 12, 2020	
BTS	Burning Up (Fire)	BTS	November 12, 2020	
BTS	Dionysus	BTS	November 12, 2020	
BTS	DNA	BTS	November 12, 2020	
BTS	Dope	BTS	November 12, 2020	
BTS	Dynamite	BTS	November 12, 2020	
BTS	Fake Love	BTS	November 12, 2020	
BTS	Idol	BTS	November 12, 2020	
BTS	Mic Drop (Steve Aoki Remix) (Note: Stylized as "MIC Drop".)	BTS	November 12, 2020	
BTS	Not Today	BTS	November 12, 2020	
BTS	Ugh!	BTS	November 12, 2020	
Interscope Mixtape	Counting Stars	OneRepublic	May 27, 2021	
Interscope Mixtape	DNA.	Kendrick Lamar	May 27, 2021	
Interscope Mixtape	Don't Cha	The Pussycat Dolls	May 27, 2021	
Interscope Mixtape	Party Rock Anthem	LMFAO, Lauren Bennett, GoonRock	May 27, 2021	
Interscope Mixtape	Rollin' (Air Raid Vehicle)	Limp Bizkit	May 27, 2021	
Interscope Mixtape	Sugar	Maroon 5	May 27, 2021	
Interscope Mixtape	The Sweet Escape (ft. Akon)	Gwen Stefani, Akon	May 27, 2021	
Skrillex	Bangarang (feat. Sirah)	Skrillex, Sirah	August 31, 2021	
Skrillex	Butterflies	Skrillex, Starrah, Four Tet	August 31, 2021	
Skrillex	Don't Go	Skrillex, Justin Bieber, Don Toliver	August 31, 2021	
Skrillex	The Devil's Den	Skrillex, Wolfgang Gartner	August 31, 2021	
Skrillex	Ragga Bomb	Skrillex, Ragga Twins	August 31, 2021	
Skrillex	First of the Year (Equinox)	Skrillex	August 31, 2021	
Skrillex	Rock 'n' Roll (Will Take You to the Mountain)	Skrillex	August 31, 2021	
Skrillex	Scary Monsters and Nice Sprites	Skrillex	August 31, 2021	
Billie Eilish	All the Good Girls Go to Hell	Billie Eilish	September 21, 2021	
Billie Eilish	Bad Guy	Billie Eilish	September 21, 2021	
Billie Eilish	You Should See Me in a Crown	Billie Eilish	September 21, 2021	
Billie Eilish	Bury a Friend	Billie Eilish	September 21, 2021	
Billie Eilish	Bellyache	Billie Eilish	September 21, 2021	
Billie Eilish	Happier Than Ever	Billie Eilish	September 21, 2021	
Billie Eilish	I Didn't Change My Number	Billie Eilish	September 21, 2021	
Billie Eilish	NDA	Billie Eilish	September 21, 2021	
Billie Eilish	Oxytocin	Billie Eilish	September 21, 2021	
Billie Eilish	Therefore I Am	Billie Eilish	September 21, 2021	
Lady Gaga	Alejandro	Lady Gaga	December 9, 2021	
Lady Gaga	Bad Romance	Lady Gaga	December 9, 2021	
Lady Gaga	Born This Way	Lady Gaga	December 9, 2021	
Lady Gaga	Just Dance (feat. Colby O'Donis)	Lady Gaga	December 9, 2021	
Lady Gaga	Paparazzi	Lady Gaga	December 9, 2021	
Lady Gaga	Poker Face	Lady Gaga	December 9, 2021	
Lady Gaga	Rain On Me (with Ariana Grande)	Lady Gaga	December 9, 2021	
Lady Gaga	Stupid Love	Lady Gaga	December 9, 2021	
Lady Gaga	Telephone (feat. Beyoncé)	Lady Gaga	December 9, 2021	
Lady Gaga	The Edge Of Glory	Lady Gaga	December 9, 2021	
Fall Out Boy	Centuries	Fall Out Boy	March 31, 2022	
Fall Out Boy	Dance, Dance	Fall Out Boy	March 31, 2022	
Fall Out Boy	I Don't Care	Fall Out Boy	March 31, 2022	
Fall Out Boy	Immortals	Fall Out Boy	March 31, 2022	
Fall Out Boy	Irresistible	Fall Out Boy	March 31, 2022	
Fall Out Boy	My Songs Know What You Did in the Dark (Light Em Up)	Fall Out Boy	March 31, 2022	
Fall Out Boy	This Ain't a Scene, It's an Arms Race	Fall Out Boy	March 31, 2022	
Fall Out Boy	Thnks fr th Mmrs	Fall Out Boy	March 31, 2022	
Electronic Mixtape	Waiting All Night (feat. Ella Eyre)	Rudimental	May 5, 2022	
Electronic Mixtape	Witchcraft	Pendulum	May 5, 2022	
Electronic Mixtape	Icarus	Madeon	May 5, 2022	
Electronic Mixtape	Alone	Marshmello	May 5, 2022	
Electronic Mixtape	Ghosts 'n' stuff (feat. Rob Swire)	Deadmau5	May 5, 2022	
Electronic Mixtape	Stay the Night (feat. Hayley Wiliams)	Zedd	May 5, 2022	
Electronic Mixtape	Sandstorm	Darude	May 5, 2022	
Electronic Mixtape	The Rockafeller Skank	Fatboy Slim	May 5, 2022	
Electronic Mixtape	Freestyler	Bomfunk MC	May 5, 2022	
Electronic Mixtape	Animals	Martin Garrix	May 5, 2022	
Lizzo	2 Be Loved (Am I Ready)	Lizzo	October 6, 2022	
Lizzo	About Damn Time	Lizzo	October 6, 2022	
Lizzo	Cuz I Love You	Lizzo	October 6, 2022	
Lizzo	Everybody's Gay	Lizzo	October 6, 2022	
Lizzo	Good as Hell	Lizzo	October 6, 2022	
Lizzo	Juice	Lizzo	October 6, 2022	
Lizzo	Tempo (feat. Missy Elliott)	Lizzo	October 6, 2022	
Lizzo	Truth Hurts	Lizzo	October 6, 2022	
Lizzo	Worship	Lizzo	October 6, 2022	
The Weeknd	Die for You (Remix) (feat. Ariana Grande)	The Weeknd	June 29, 2023	
The Weeknd	Less Than Zero	The Weeknd	June 29, 2023	
The Weeknd	Blinding Lights	The Weeknd	November 8, 2022	
The Weeknd	Can't Feel My Face	The Weeknd	November 8, 2022	
The Weeknd	How Do I Make You Love Me?	The Weeknd	November 8, 2022	
The Weeknd	I Feel It Coming (feat. Daft Punk)	The Weeknd	November 8, 2022	
The Weeknd	Pray For Me	The Weeknd, Kendrick Lamar	November 8, 2022	
The Weeknd	Sacrifice	The Weeknd	November 8, 2022	
The Weeknd	Save Your Tears	The Weeknd	November 8, 2022	
The Weeknd	Starboy (feat. Daft Punk)	The Weeknd	November 8, 2022	
The Weeknd	Take My Breath	The Weeknd	November 8, 2022	
The Weeknd	The Hills	The Weeknd	November 8, 2022	
Rock Mixtape	Born To Be Wild	Steppenwolf	December 13, 2022	
Rock Mixtape	Eye of the Tiger	Survivor	December 13, 2022	
Rock Mixtape	Free Bird	Lynyrd Skynyrd	December 13, 2022	
Rock Mixtape	I Was Made For Lovin' You	Kiss	December 13, 2022	
Rock Mixtape	Seven Nation Army	The White Stripes	December 13, 2022	
Rock Mixtape	Smells Like Teen Spirit	Nirvana	December 13, 2022	
Rock Mixtape	Sweet Child O' Mine	Guns N' Roses	December 13, 2022	
Rock Mixtape	The Pretender	Foo Fighters	December 13, 2022	
Queen	Another One Bites the Dust	Queen	May 24, 2023	
Queen	Bohemian Rhapsody	Queen	May 24, 2023	
Queen	Crazy Little Thing Called Love	Queen	May 24, 2023	
Queen	Don't Stop Me Now	Queen	May 24, 2023	
Queen	I Want It All	Queen	May 24, 2023	
Queen	Killer Queen	Queen	May 24, 2023	
Queen	One Vision	Queen	May 24, 2023	
Queen	Somebody to Love	Queen	May 24, 2023	
Queen	Stone Cold Crazy	Queen	May 24, 2023	
Queen	We Are the Champions	Queen	May 24, 2023	
Queen	We Will Rock You	Queen	May 24, 2023	
Linkin Park x Mike Shinoda	Already Over	Mike Shinoda	October 5, 2023	
Linkin Park x Mike Shinoda	Crawling	Linkin Park	October 5, 2023	
Linkin Park x Mike Shinoda	Fighting Myself	Linkin Park	October 5, 2023	
Linkin Park x Mike Shinoda	In My Head	Mike Shinoda, Kailee Morgue	October 5, 2023	
Linkin Park x Mike Shinoda	Lost	Linkin Park	October 5, 2023	
Linkin Park x Mike Shinoda	More the Victim	Linkin Park	October 5, 2023	
Linkin Park x Mike Shinoda	Numb/Encore	Jay-Z, Linkin Park	October 5, 2023	
Linkin Park x Mike Shinoda	Remember the Name	Fort Minor, Styles of Beyond	October 5, 2023	
The Rolling Stones	Angry	The Rolling Stones	October 30, 2023	
The Rolling Stones	Bite My Head Off (feat. Paul McCartney)	The Rolling Stones	October 30, 2023	
The Rolling Stones	Can't You Hear Me Knocking	The Rolling Stones	October 30, 2023	
The Rolling Stones	Gimme Shelter	The Rolling Stones	October 30, 2023	
The Rolling Stones	(I Can't Get No) Satisfaction	The Rolling Stones	October 30, 2023	
The Rolling Stones	Live By the Sword (feat. Elton John)	The Rolling Stones	October 30, 2023	
The Rolling Stones	Mess It Up	The Rolling Stones	October 30, 2023	
The Rolling Stones	Paint It Black	The Rolling Stones	October 30, 2023	
The Rolling Stones	Start Me Up	The Rolling Stones	October 30, 2023	
The Rolling Stones	Sympathy For The Devil	The Rolling Stones	October 30, 2023	
The Rolling Stones	Whole Wide World	The Rolling Stones	October 30, 2023	
Daft Punk	Around the World	Daft Punk	March 7, 2024	
Daft Punk	Around the World / Harder Better Faster Stronger (Live 2007)	Daft Punk	March 7, 2024	
Daft Punk	Da Funk / Daftendirekt	Daft Punk	March 7, 2024	
Daft Punk	Get Lucky (feat. Pharrell Williams and Nile Rodgers)	Daft Punk	March 7, 2024	
Daft Punk	Harder, Better, Faster, Stronger	Daft Punk	March 7, 2024	
Daft Punk	Lose Yourself to Dance (feat. Pharrell Williams)	Daft Punk	March 7, 2024	
Daft Punk	One More Time	Daft Punk	March 7, 2024	
Daft Punk	Technologic	Daft Punk	March 7, 2024	
Daft Punk	The Prime Time of Your Life (Live 2007)	Daft Punk	March 7, 2024	
Daft Punk	Veridis Quo	Daft Punk	March 7, 2024	
Hip Hop Mixtape	All Eyez On Me (feat. Big Syke)	2Pac	April 9, 2024	
Hip Hop Mixtape	Anaconda	Nicki Minaj	April 9, 2024	
Hip Hop Mixtape	Gin and Juice	Snoop Dogg	April 9, 2024	
Hip Hop Mixtape	Godzilla (feat. Juice Wrld)	Eminem	April 9, 2024	
Hip Hop Mixtape	Hey Ya!	Outkast	April 9, 2024	
Hip Hop Mixtape	Hypnotize	The Notorious B.I.G.	April 9, 2024	
Hip Hop Mixtape	Nuthin' But A "G" Thang	Dr. Dre	April 9, 2024	
Hip Hop Mixtape	The Message	Grandmaster Flash & The Furious Five	April 9, 2024	
Hip Hop Mixtape	The Woo (feat. 50 Cent, Roddy Ricch)	Pop Smoke	April 9, 2024	
Shock Drops	Houdini	Eminem	September 5, 2024	
Shock Drops	Not Like Us	Kendrick Lamar	February 27, 2025	
Shock Drops	Abracadabra	Lady Gaga	June 5, 2025	
Shock Drops	Birds of a Feather	Billie Eilish	July 10, 2025	
Shock Drops	Espresso	Sabrina Carpenter	July 24, 2025	
Shock Drops	Gabriela	Katseye	September 22, 2025	
Shock Drops	Spooky, Scary Skeletons (Undead Tombstone Remix)	Andrew Gold, The Living Tombstone	October 30, 2025	
Shock Drops	Me Porto Bonito	Bad Bunny, Chencho Corleone	February 5, 2026	
Shock Drops	Stressed Out	Twenty One Pilots	March 26, 2026	
Shock Drops	Zombie	Yungblud	June 25, 2026	
Shock Drops	APT.	ROSÉ, Bruno Mars	September 29, 2026	
Shock Drops	Ghostbusters	Ray Parker Jr.	October 15, 2026	
Britney Spears	...Baby One More Time	Britney Spears	October 8, 2024	
Britney Spears	Circus	Britney Spears	October 8, 2024	
Britney Spears	Gimme More	Britney Spears	October 8, 2024	
Britney Spears	I'm a Slave 4 U	Britney Spears	October 8, 2024	
Britney Spears	Me Against the Music (feat. Madonna)	Britney Spears	October 8, 2024	
Britney Spears	Oops!...I Did It Again	Britney Spears	October 8, 2024	
Britney Spears	Overprotected	Britney Spears	October 8, 2024	
Britney Spears	Scream and Shout	Britney Spears, Will.i.am	October 8, 2024	
Britney Spears	Till the World Ends	Britney Spears	October 8, 2024	
Britney Spears	Toxic	Britney Spears	October 8, 2024	
Britney Spears	Womanizer	Britney Spears	October 8, 2024	
Monstercat Mixtape 2	Accelerate	Teminite, Skybreak	November 12, 2024	
Monstercat Mixtape 2	Dabadabadabadaba	Excision, Dion Timmer	November 12, 2024	
Monstercat Mixtape 2	Dead Man Walking	Grant, Ellis	November 12, 2024	
Monstercat Mixtape 2	Endgame	Bossfight	November 12, 2024	
Monstercat Mixtape 2	Final Boss	Nitro Fun	November 12, 2024	
Monstercat Mixtape 2	Memory Bank	Dyro, Conro	November 12, 2024	
Monstercat Mixtape 2	Mercenary	F.O.O.L, Power Glove	November 12, 2024	
Monstercat Mixtape 2	Pump	Teddy Killerzs, Pegboard Nerds	November 12, 2024	
Monstercat Mixtape 2	Rad	Tokyo Machine	November 12, 2024	
Monstercat Mixtape 2	Riot	Öwnboss, Selva	November 12, 2024	
Monstercat Mixtape 2	Thrones of Blood	Sullivan King	November 12, 2024	
Monstercat Mixtape 2	Wake Up	Alan Walker	November 12, 2024	
Metallica	Atlas, Rise!	Metallica	December 10, 2024	
Metallica	Battery	Metallica	December 10, 2024	
Metallica	Blackened	Metallica	December 10, 2024	
Metallica	Creeping Death	Metallica	December 10, 2024	
Metallica	Enter Sandman	Metallica	December 10, 2024	
Metallica	Fade to Black	Metallica	December 10, 2024	
Metallica	For Whom the Bell Tolls	Metallica	December 10, 2024	
Metallica	Fuel	Metallica	December 10, 2024	
Metallica	Hit the Lights	Metallica	December 10, 2024	
Metallica	King Nothing	Metallica	December 10, 2024	
Metallica	Lux Æterna	Metallica	December 10, 2024	
Metallica	Master of Puppets	Metallica	December 10, 2024	
Metallica	Nothing Else Matters	Metallica	December 10, 2024	
Metallica	One	Metallica	December 10, 2024	
Metallica	Sad But True	Metallica	December 10, 2024	
Metallica	Seek & Destroy	Metallica	December 10, 2024	
Metallica	The Unforgiven	Metallica	December 10, 2024	
Coldplay	A Sky Full of Stars	Coldplay	December 18, 2025	
Coldplay	Adventure of a Lifetime	Coldplay	December 18, 2025	
Coldplay	Clocks	Coldplay	December 18, 2025	
Coldplay	Feelslikeimfallinginlove	Coldplay	December 18, 2025	
Coldplay	Good Feelings (Note: Stylized as "GOOD FEELiNGS".)	Coldplay, Ayra Starr	December 18, 2025	
Coldplay	Something Just Like This	The Chainsmokers, Coldplay	December 18, 2025	
Coldplay	Speed of Sound	Coldplay	December 18, 2025	
Coldplay	Talk	Coldplay	December 18, 2025	
Coldplay	Trouble	Coldplay	December 18, 2025	
Coldplay	Viva La Vida	Coldplay	December 18, 2025	
Coldplay	We Pray	Coldplay, Little Simz, Burna Boy, Elyanna, Tini	December 18, 2025	
Coldplay	Yellow	Coldplay	December 18, 2025	
The Prodigy	Breathe	The Prodigy	April 29, 2026	
The Prodigy	Firestarter	The Prodigy	April 29, 2026	
The Prodigy	Invaders Must Die	The Prodigy	April 29, 2026	
The Prodigy	Omen	The Prodigy	April 29, 2026	
The Prodigy	Poison	The Prodigy	April 29, 2026	
The Prodigy	Spitfire	The Prodigy	April 29, 2026	
Hip Hop Mixtape 2	TV Off	Kendrick Lamar	August 27, 2026	
Hip Hop Mixtape 2	Industry Baby	Lil Nas X & Jack Harlow	August 27, 2026	
Hip Hop Mixtape 2	Kiss Me More (feat. SZA)	Doja Cat	August 27, 2026	
Hip Hop Mixtape 2	Surround Sound (feat. 21 Savage & Baby Tate)	JID	August 27, 2026	
Hip Hop Mixtape 2	6 Foot 7 Foot (feat. Cory Gunz)	Lil Wayne	August 27, 2026	
Hip Hop Mixtape 2	I Like It (with Bad Bunny & J Balvin)	Cardi B	August 27, 2026	
Hip Hop Mixtape 2	Nissan Altima	Doechii	August 27, 2026	
Hip Hop Mixtape 2	Million Dollar Baby	Tommy Richman	August 27, 2026	
