= Bad Liar =

Bad Liar may refer to:

- "Bad Liar" (Selena Gomez song), 2017
- "Bad Liar" (Imagine Dragons song), 2018
