= Zero (Imagine Dragons song) =

Single by Imagine Dragons

from the album Origins and Ralph Breaks the Internet (Original Motion Picture Soundtrack)
- Released: September 19, 2018
- Recorded: 2018
- Genre: Pop; rock
- Length: 3:31
- Label: Interscope; Kidinakorner; Walt Disney
- Songwriters: Dan Reynolds; Ben McKee; Wayne Sermon; Daniel Platzman; John Hill
- Producer: John Hill

Imagine Dragons singles chronology
"Natural" (2018)	"Zero" (2018)	"Machine" (2018)

Music video
- "Zero" on YouTube

"Zero" (Note: Officially titled "Zero" (From the Original Motion Picture "Ralph Breaks the Internet")) is a song by American pop rock band Imagine Dragons, who co-wrote it with their producer John Hill. It is the second single from the band's fourth studio album Origins (2018). The song is featured in the 2018 Disney animated film Ralph Breaks the Internet and was included in its second official trailer and its soundtrack.

== Background ==
Dan Reynolds, the band's frontman, said that "[the] song speaks to" the title character's struggle for self-acceptance, which the band resonated with, while the film's co-director, Rich Moore, called the song "a bold choice for an end-credit song because it's about someone who feels like a zero, someone who hasn't always felt worthy, someone who's allowed his entire sense of self to rely on a single friendship". Phil Johnston, the film's co-writer and co-director, said that Ralph's insecurity is a feeling everyone can relate to, "but the song tells us we’re not alone. They nailed the theme of the movie in a way that also makes you want to dance."

== Critical reception ==
Markos Papadatos of Digital Journal stated that the song is "worth more than just a passing glance, and it garners two thumbs up."

== Music video ==
A music video for the song was released on October 23, 2018. The video takes place in an arcade, and promotes the Disney animated film Ralph Breaks The Internet. It has received over 97 million views as of August 2026.

== Live performances ==
"Zero" was performed live for the first time at the iHeartRadio Music Festival on September 22, 2018, along with another song from the album: "Natural". "Zero" was also performed at Jimmy Kimmel Live! on November 5, 2018. "Zero" was also performed live at the Cosmopolitan in Las Vegas on November 7, along with three other songs from the album: "Natural", "Machine" and "Bad Liar".

== Charts ==
=== Weekly charts ===
Chart (2018–2019)	Peak position
Belgium (Ultratip Bubbling Under Flanders)	1
Czech Republic Airplay (ČNS IFPI)	99
Hungary (Rádiós Top 40)	33
Hungary (Single Top 40)	18
Hungary (Stream Top 40)	31
Italy (FIMI)	24
Netherlands (Single Tip)	11
Slovakia Airplay (ČNS IFPI)	72
Sweden (Sverigetopplistan)	92
Switzerland (Schweizer Hitparade)	76
US Hot Rock & Alternative Songs (Billboard)	9

=== Year-end charts ===
Chart (2018)	Position
US Hot Rock Songs (Billboard)	93
Chart (2019)	Position
Hungary (Rádiós Top 40)	77
US Hot Rock Songs (Billboard)	46

== Certifications ==
Region	Certification	Certified units/sales
Brazil (Pro-Música Brasil)	2× Platinum	80,000^{‡}
Italy (FIMI)	Platinum	50,000^{‡}
New Zealand (RMNZ)	Gold	15,000^{‡}
United Kingdom (BPI)	Silver	200,000^{‡}
United States (RIAA)	Platinum	1,000,000^{‡}
^{‡} Sales+streaming figures based on certification alone.

== Release history ==
Region	Date	Format	Label	Ref.
Various	September 19, 2018	Digital download	Interscope	
Italy	September 21, 2018	Contemporary hit radio	Interscope	
