= Born to Be Yours =

Single by Kygo and Imagine Dragons

from the album Origins (international deluxe)
- Released: 15 June 2018
- Genre: EDM
- Length: 3:13
- Label: Sony; Ultra
- Songwriters: Kyrre Gørvell-Dahll; Dan Reynolds; Wayne Sermon; Ben McKee; Daniel Platzman
- Producer: Kygo

Kygo singles chronology
"Remind Me to Forget" (2018)	"Born to Be Yours" (2018)	"Happy Now" (2018)

Imagine Dragons singles chronology
"Next to Me" (2018)	"Born to Be Yours" (2018)	"Natural" (2018)

Music video
- "Born to Be Yours" on YouTube

"Born to Be Yours" is a song written and performed by Norwegian music producer Kygo and American band Imagine Dragons. Produced by Kygo, it was released by Sony and Ultra Music on 15 June 2018. It is included on the international deluxe edition of Imagine Dragons' fourth studio album Origins. The song is featured in the second trailer for the 2020 animated film Scoob! based on the popular Scooby-Doo franchise.

== Release and background ==
On 11 June 2018, Kygo teased the collaboration on social media with a picture of him and all members from Imagine Dragons, captioning the post with a musical notes emoji. He revealed the song's artwork the following day. On 14 June, both artists posted an audio preview and a release date for the song on social media. "'Born to Be Yours' feels to me like the perfect combination of my sound mixed with the band's iconic elements and vocals," Kygo said of the song in a statement. "Imagine Dragons are one of my favorite bands and it's an honor to finally let everyone hear what we've been working on."

== Composition ==
"Born to Be Yours" is an EDM song that modelled on radio rock with a slight element of folk. The song features "a chill electronic beat", accompanied by "hand claps and acoustic guitars". It was described as "a genre-defying amalgamation of Kygo's signature melodies and typical Imagine Dragons' instrumentals as well as Dan Reynolds' celestial voice".

== Critical reception ==
Matthew Meadow of Your EDM praised the song, calling it "a deliciously sweet song that absolutely hits the spot". He regarded the track as "the perfect combination of both artists' sounds", writing that "Kygo's production blends seamlessly with the acoustic guitar strums and Reynolds' voice". Ryan Castillo of Dancing Astronaut described the song as a representation of "the perfect artistic synergy between the American band's unmistakable vocal quality and Kygo's melodic tropical chord progressions". He noted the song's most refreshing feature as the integration of elements from Kygo's musical roots, and concluded by deeming the track a "balanced, deeply moving, and impressively chill" collaboration.

== Music video ==
The music video is directed by Matt Eastin and Aaron Hymes, and involves a civilized sasquatch falling in love with someone, only to realize she is a hunter, however, he is saved by another Sasquatch. The Sasquatch is played by Joshua James and Michael S. Fritchen aka “The Fritchenator” plays the hick with the “No Squatches” sign. It was filmed in Utah.

== Personnel ==
Credits adapted from Tidal.

- Kygo – production
- Dan Reynolds – vocals
- Serban Ghenea – mix engineering
- Randy Merrill – master engineering

== Charts ==
=== Weekly charts ===
Chart (2018)	Peak position
Australia (ARIA)	18
Austria (Ö3 Austria Top 40)	12
Belgium (Ultratop 50 Flanders)	41
Belgium (Ultratop 50 Wallonia)	21
Canada Hot 100 (Billboard)	31
Croatia (HRT)	27
CIS Airplay (TopHit)	48
Czech Republic Airplay (ČNS IFPI)	67
Czech Republic Singles Digital (ČNS IFPI)	6
France (SNEP)	14
Germany (GfK)	22
Hungary (Rádiós Top 40)	7
Hungary (Single Top 40)	14
Hungary (Stream Top 40)	9
Ireland (IRMA)	19
Italy (FIMI)	44
Mexico Airplay (Billboard)	9
Netherlands (Dutch Top 40)	16
Netherlands (Single Top 100)	36
New Zealand (Recorded Music NZ)	22
Norway (VG-lista)	4
Poland Airplay (ZPAV)	12
Portugal (AFP)	31
Russia Airplay (TopHit)	31
Scottish Singles Sales (Official Charts)	23
Slovakia Airplay (ČNS IFPI)	6
Slovakia Singles Digital (ČNS IFPI)	9
Slovenia (SloTop50)	6
Spain (PROMUSICAE)	90
Sweden (Sverigetopplistan)	4
Switzerland (Schweizer Hitparade)	5
Ukraine Airplay (TopHit)	8
UK Singles (Official Charts)	54
US Billboard Hot 100	74
US Hot Dance/Electronic Songs (Billboard)	3

2025 weekly chart performance for "Born to Be Yours"
Chart (2025)	Peak position
Venezuela Airplay (Record Report)	129

=== Year-end charts ===
Chart (2018)	Position
Australia (ARIA)	78
Austria (Ö3 Austria Top 40)	36
Belgium (Ultratop Wallonia)	91
Germany (Official German Charts)	87
Hungary (Rádiós Top 40)	47
Hungary (Single Top 40)	62
Netherlands (Dutch Top 40)	90
Portugal (AFP)	163
Slovenia (SloTop50)	32
Sweden (Sverigetopplistan)	31
Switzerland (Schweizer Hitparade)	46
US Hot Dance/Electronic Songs (Billboard)	23

== Certifications ==
Region	Certification	Certified units/sales
Australia (ARIA)	2× Platinum	140,000^{‡}
Austria (IFPI Austria)	Gold	15,000^{‡}
Canada (Music Canada)	3× Platinum	240,000^{‡}
Denmark (IFPI Danmark)	Gold	45,000^{‡}
France (SNEP)	Gold	100,000^{‡}
Germany (BVMI)	Gold	200,000^{‡}
Italy (FIMI)	Platinum	50,000^{‡}
Mexico (AMPROFON)	2× Platinum+Gold	150,000^{‡}
New Zealand (RMNZ)	2× Platinum	60,000^{‡}
Poland (ZPAV)	2× Platinum	40,000^{‡}
Spain (Promusicae)	Gold	30,000^{‡}
Switzerland (IFPI Switzerland)	Platinum	20,000^{‡}
United Kingdom (BPI)	Gold	400,000^{‡}
^{‡} Sales+streaming figures based on certification alone.
