= Machine (Imagine Dragons song) =

Single by Imagine Dragons

from the album Origins
- Released: October 31, 2018
- Recorded: 2018
- Genre: Arena rock; industrial
- Length: 3:02
- Label: Interscope; KIDinaKORNER
- Songwriter(s): Dan Reynolds; Ben McKee; Wayne Sermon; Daniel Platzman; Alex da Kid
- Producer(s): Alex da Kid

Imagine Dragons singles chronology
| "Zero" (2018) | "Machine" (2018) | "Bad Liar" (2018) |

Licensed audio
- "Imagine Dragons - Machine (Audio)" on YouTube

"Machine" is a song by American pop rock band Imagine Dragons, who co-wrote it with their producer Alex da Kid. It is the third single from the band's fourth studio album Origins.

== Background ==
A snippet of the track was teased in the trailer for Origins. The song was officially announced on social media the day before it was released. On Twitter, the cover art for the song was posted, as well as the caption "Our new song Machine drops TOMORROW morning".

== Composition ==
The song has been labeled as arena rock and industrial by critics.

== Critical reception ==
In a positive review of the album by The Independent, the song (along with another single, "Natural") was described as "stomping, stadium filling anthems that scream defiance and are what most would brand "classic" Imagine Dragons". Billboard also described the song as "explosive" and "powerful".

== Lyrics ==
The song's lyrics are about "living outside the box others might put you in" and possible references to social and political realities.

== Live performances ==
"Machine" was performed live for the first time at the Cosmopolitan in Las Vegas on November 7, along with three other songs from the album: "Natural", "Zero" and "Bad Liar".

== Personnel ==
=== Imagine Dragons ===
- Dan Reynolds – lead vocals, keyboards
- Wayne Sermon – electric guitar, backing vocals
- Ben McKee – bass guitar, keyboards, backing vocals
- Daniel Platzman – drums, percussion

=== Production ===
- Alex da Kid – production

== Charts ==
=== Weekly charts ===
| Chart (2018–19) | Peak position |
|---|---|
| Czech Republic (Singles Digitál Top 100) | 31 |
| Hungary (Stream Top 40) | 30 |
| New Zealand Hot Singles (RMNZ) | 16 |
| Slovakia (Singles Digitál Top 100) | 20 |
| Sweden Heatseeker (Sverigetopplistan) | 8 |
| US Hot Rock & Alternative Songs (Billboard) | 17 |

=== Year-end charts ===
| Chart (2019) | Position |
|---|---|
| US Hot Rock Songs (Billboard) | 79 |

== Certifications ==
| Region | Certification | Certified units/sales |
|---|---|---|
| Brazil (Pro-Música Brasil) | Platinum | 40,000^{‡} |
| United States (RIAA) | Gold | 500,000^{‡} |
^{‡} Sales+streaming figures based on certification alone.
