= Ralph Breaks the Internet (soundtrack) =

Ralph Breaks the Internet (Original Motion Picture Soundtrack)

Film score by Henry Jackman
- Released: November 16, 2018 (Digital); November 30, 2018 (CD)
- Studios: Newman Scoring Stage, 20th Century Studios
- Genre: Film score
- Label: Walt Disney
- Producers: Henry Jackman; Tom MacDougall

Henry Jackman chronology
| The Predator (2018) | Ralph Breaks the Internet (Original Motion Picture Soundtrack) (2018) | Io (2019) |

Singles from Ralph Breaks the Internet (Original Motion Picture Soundtrack)
- 1. "Zero" Released: September 19, 2018

Ralph Breaks the Internet (Original Motion Picture Soundtrack) is the soundtrack album for the film of the same name. Composed by the first film's composer, Henry Jackman, the soundtrack was released digitally on November 16, 2018, and was followed with a physical release on November 30, 2018.

== Background ==
On September 19, 2018, the soundtrack's first single, an end-credit song titled "Zero", performed by Imagine Dragons, was released. Dan Reynolds, the band's frontman, said that "[the] song speaks to" the title character's struggle for self-acceptance, which the band resonated with, while the film's co-director, Rich Moore, called the song "a bold choice for an end-credit song because it's about someone who feels like a zero, someone who hasn't always felt worthy, someone who's allowed his entire sense of self to rely on a single friendship". Phil Johnston, the film's co-writer and co-director, said that Ralph's insecurity is a feeling everyone can relate to, "but the song tells us we're not alone. They nailed the theme of the movie in a way that also makes you want to dance."

The soundtrack also features an original song called "A Place Called Slaughter Race" which is performed by Sarah Silverman and Gal Gadot, the voice actresses of Vanellope von Schweetz and Shank, respectively. The song, which focuses on Vanellope's wish to grow as a person outside of her game, Sugar Rush, was written by Johnston and Disney's executive vice-president of music, Tom MacDougall, while the music for the song was composed by Disney's recurring composer, Alan Menken. On the song's purpose, Johnston said "We were exploring ways that Vanellope's arc could be completed in a fulfilling way", while Silverman said that "Vanellope learns from the other Disney princesses that she must have a quest, a desire—a ‘want’—and that she needs to express that desire in song", and Gadot said that "The song is really about Vanellope, who's at a crossroads in her life, she's fallen in love with Slaughter Race and has found an immediate older-sister connection with Shank, which is a completely different relationship than she has with Ralph. And this place has made her question the life she's living". MacDougall said that "It's funny that Vanellope is singing and the lyrics are unexpected, but the music was never intended to be a joke. We always wanted it to be earnest and real". Johnston said that working with Menken was "the realization of a weird dream [he] never imagined could actually come true".

A pop version of the song, called "In This Place", performed by Julia Michaels, was also featured in the end credits. Michaels said that the character of Vanellope was one of her favorite things of the film "because she's just completely misunderstood. I think a lot of people feel that way —misunderstood— and go through life trying to find their power. And when they find it, it's really beautiful." Johnston said that Michaels "made the song her own. "She took the longing and the desire that Vanellope has and translated it into something she's clearly feeling. It's a very personal interpretation of the song. Her soul is on fire", while MacDougall said that the song was hard to convert to pop "When you try to translate it into a more contemporary arrangement, you still have lyrics about dumpster fires and burning tires, among other colorful ideas. But Julia's such a huge fan of Disney Animation that she really wanted to see what she could come up with. She was able to extract something that even if you heard the song without any knowledge of the original, there's so much to enjoy". Michaels was shown 15 minutes of the film for inspiration, and Johnston said that "she was laughing and I think she cried twice. She has very easy access to her emotions, and ultimately was able to honor the song while making a genuine connection".

The film's composer, Henry Jackman, created a score that both acts as reminiscent of the previous film (which he also composed) and embraces the film's setting and history, which Johnston said was important. Jackman said that the film's change of setting was its biggest difference from the previous one, stating that "While [he] can retain some of the original material, there's a new layer [he] had to create and integrate. There's a distinction between arcade electronica and internet electronica, which sounds more modern". Jackman said that while "there's so many fun things to enjoy" in the film, its "universality comes from the fact that it's an important archetypal friendship story. Hidden behind all of this amazing technology and imagery is something very solid emotionally and narratively". Moore called the score "Henry's best work" and praised him as "an extraordinary composer and truly a brilliant musician and writer. The emotion he brings is profound, thoughtful and funny", while Johnston called Jackman "a very contemporary composer, but he's not afraid to use elements that are electronic and synth, as well as traditional orchestra". To prepare Jackman, the filmmakers showed him a 4-minute clip of the film, which Jackman called "inspiring". To display Vanellope's growing throughout the film, Jackman used a more mature version of her theme of the first film. Jackman used club music for the theme of the character Yess. while he was inspired by brass arrangements from 1970 for Slaughter Race's theme, though with "slightly tougher program beats". Jackman said that Moore and Johnston encouraged him to use a score that leaned into the plot, stating that "if it's aggressive, be aggressive. If it's emotional, take it seriously. If it's worrying, don't pull your punches. Just go for it".

== Track listing ==
All music is composed by Henry Jackman.

| No. | Title | Writer(s) | Artist(s) | Length |
|---|---|---|---|---|
| 1. | "Zero" | Dan Reynolds, Wayne Sermon, Ben McKee, Daniel Platzman and John Hill | Imagine Dragons | 3:30 |
| 2. | "A Place Called Slaughter Race" | Alan Menken (music); Phil Johnston and Tom MacDougall (lyrics) | Sarah Silverman, Gal Gadot and Cast | 3:28 |
| 3. | "In This Place" | Menken (music); Johnston and MacDougall (lyrics) | Julia Michaels | 3:21 |
| 4. | "Best Friends" | | | 2:53 |
| 5. | "Circuit Breaker" | | | 2:22 |
| 6. | "Pulling the Plug" | | | 1:14 |
| 7. | "On the Rooftop" | | | 1:04 |
| 8. | "The Big Idea" | | | 1:15 |
| 9. | "The Internet" | | | 2:47 |
| 10. | "KnowsMore & Spamley" | | | 1:18 |
| 11. | "Site Seeing" | | | 1:30 |
| 12. | "Check Out Fiasco" | | | 1:33 |
| 13. | "Get Rich Quick" | | | 1:43 |
| 14. | "Shank" | | | 3:03 |
| 15. | "Hanging Out" | | | 1:03 |
| 16. | "BuzzzTube" | | | 1:42 |
| 17. | "Overnight Sensation" | | | 2:52 |
| 18. | "Separate Ways" | | | 1:04 |
| 19. | "Vanellope's March" (includes "The Imperial March" and "Main Title" from Star Wars by John Williams) | | | 0:46 |
| 20. | "Desperate Measures" | | | 1:20 |
| 21. | "Don't Read the Comments" | | | 1:49 |
| 22. | "Growing Pains" | | | 1:35 |
| 23. | "Double Dan" | | | 3:36 |
| 24. | "Scanning for Insecurities" | | | 1:54 |
| 25. | "Breaking Up" | | | 2:46 |
| 26. | "Replicate-It Ralph" | | | 1:20 |
| 27. | "Operation Pied Piper" | | | 2:38 |
| 28. | "Kling Kong" | | | 3:39 |
| 29. | "The Meaning of Friendship" | | | 2:16 |
| 30. | "A Big Strong Man in Need of Rescuing" (includes "How Far I'll Go" from Moana, "Part of Your World" from The Little Mermaid, "The Great Thaw" and "Vuelle (Reprise)" from Frozen, "The Games" and "Fate and Destiny" from Brave, "The Avalanche" from Mulan, "Someday My Prince Will Come" from Snow White and the Seven Dwarfs, "Colors of the Wind" from Pocahontas, and "Down in New Orleans" from The Princess and the Frog) | | | 1:55 |
| 31. | "Letting Go" | | | 1:49 |
| 32. | "Comfort Zone" | | | 1:32 |
| 33. | "Worlds Apart" | | | 1:22 |

Digital release only
| No. | Title | Writer(s) | Length |
|---|---|---|---|
| 34. | "A Place Called Slaughter Race (instrumental)" | Alan Menken (music); Phil Johnston and Tom MacDougall (lyrics) | 3:28 |
| 35. | "In this Place (instrumental)" | Alan Menken (music); Phil Johnston and Tom MacDougall (lyrics) | 3:21 |

== Additional music ==
Though not featured in the soundtrack, the film also features many songs from the Disney Princess' films: "Someday My Prince Will Come" and "I'm Wishing", from Snow White and the Seven Dwarfs; "Beauty and the Beast" from the film of the same name; and "So This Is Love" from Cinderella. A remix of Demi Lovato's version of "Let It Go" and the UK version of Shades On by The Vamps in Oh My Disney scene is also featured in the film. As is Neal Hefti's "Bat-transition" music from the 1960s Batman series. Also not included in the soundtrack is Ralph's rendition of Rick Astley's "Never Gonna Give You Up" featured in the post-credits scene.
