= Jaroslav Beck =

Czech music composer

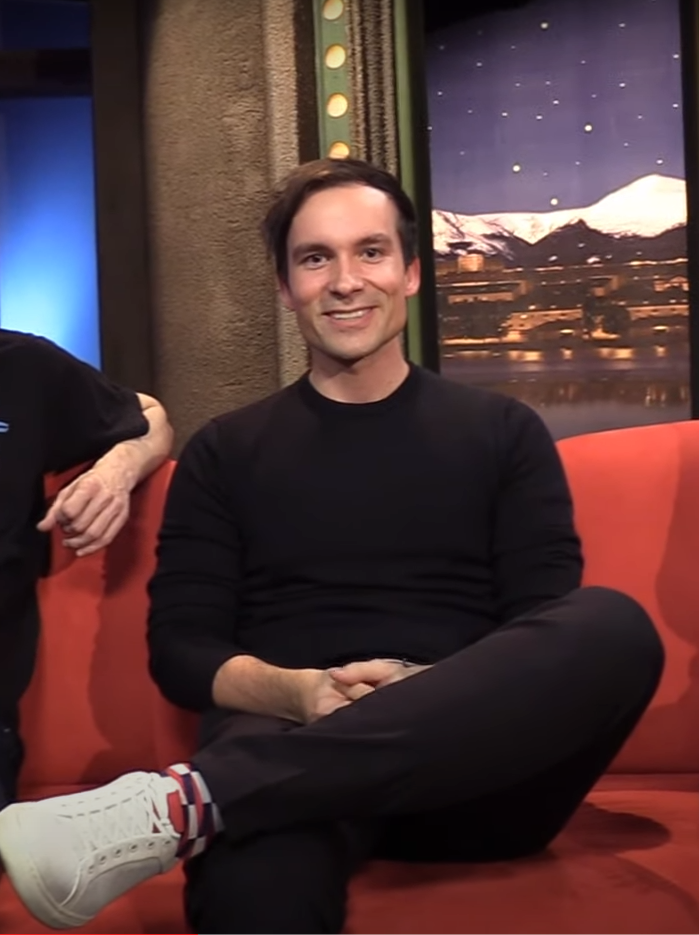
- Born: Jaroslav Beck; 29 May 1988 (age 38); Strakonice, Czechoslovakia
- Occupation: Composer
- Known for: Beat Saber
- Notable work: Beat Saber's OST's
- Website: jaroslavbeck.com

Jaroslav Beck (born 29 May 1988) is a Czech composer and entrepreneur, most known as a co-creator of the successful VR game Beat Saber. Previously, Beck produced music for Blizzard Entertainment's Overwatch short movies, an award-winning introduction trailer StarCraft: Legacy of the Void, and various trailers for Battlefield by EA Games.

In 2016, Beck founded his own company, Epic Music Productions, which was focused on creating soundtrack compositions for both the gaming and film industries. In 2018, Beck founded Beat Games with Ján Ilavský and Vladimír Hrinčár, the company behind VR game Beat Saber which is the first virtual reality game to sell one million copies.

== Life and career ==
=== Early life ===
Jaroslav was born in Strakonice in the South Bohemian Region of the Czech Republic. He was first introduced to music at the age of six when he started to learn how to play the flute. He soon realized that he didn't enjoy reproducing what someone else already composed, as it gave him no freedom and he started to create his own sounds.

At the age of 14, he started flying gliders. A year later, he successfully completed the training and obtained a pilot license. This turned out to be an important step towards music, since it gave him the confidence he needed, and it later helped him to make the decision to leave his comfort zone and pursue music full-time. In 2003, he started to study secondary technical school in Strakonice and began to work as DJ at the same time. To follow the family tradition, he entered University of West Bohemia in 2007 and studied at the Faculty of Mechanical Engineering until he quit in 2012.

=== DJ career ===
At the age of fifteen, he discovered electronic music for the first time. A major step in this direction was a techno festival in Roudnice nad Labem with Carl Cox as the headliner. He instantly fell in love with electronic music. His first gig was a techno rave in the town of Vimperk in 2007 called "Demolition" where he performed under his own name.

After Vimperk he started touring around clubs and festivals in the Czech Republic. After the "Apokalypsa" show in Brno, he changed his stage name to Jay Beck and he started to lean towards progressive house.

He had the opportunity to perform in the most desired clubs in the Czech Republic alongside both Czech and foreign DJs. He has performed at Summer of Love (Pardubice), Mácháč (Machovo Jezero), Apokalypsa (Brno), Duplex (Prague), and elsewhere. During his DJ career, he also produced his own electronic music, mostly progressive and electro house and he tried to discover his own style.

=== Oxford ===
In 2012, he quit the University of West Bohemia and went to Oxford to study Audio Production at SAE Institute. In Oxford, he changed his DJ stage name to "Sqeepo" and he started leaning towards the electronic music style called "Dubstep". During his studies at SAE, he spent most of the time in a studio composing music under his Sqeepo identity. He also composed music for a number one Slovak singer Kristína.

He successfully graduated with honours from Oxford's SAE in 2014 obtaining a BSc. (Bachelor of Science) degree.

=== Trailer music production ===
In 2013, he worked with visual effects artist Pavel Kacerle, creating sound effects and composing original music to Pavel's demo reel for Iron Man 3. The music he created for the demo reel earned him attention overseas. While still in Oxford, he got his first work offer to remix music to EA Games' Battlefield Hardline trailer in 2014. After that, more work offers followed and Jaroslav began to work on trailers for both movies and games full-time. He created music for trailers on Battlefield 4 Final Stand and Battlefield Hardline.

Beck also started to work with Blizzard Entertainment as well. His first trailer with Blizzard Entertainment was Heroes of the Storm in 2015, followed by StarCraft II: Legacy of the Void, where Jaroslav remixed an original StarCraft music. In 2016, he won a G.A.N.G. Award for the Best Cinematic / Cutscene Audio as a part of the team that stood behind the StarCraft II: Legacy of the Void introduction trailer. He also cooperated with Joshua Crispin a.k.a. Generdyn on music which was used for both a Terminator Genisys TV spot in 2015 and a Star Wars Episode VII: The Force Awakens TV spot. In 2016, he collaborated on music composition for Blizzard's Overwatch short movies (Alive, Hero, Dragons). Beck later worked with Cliff Bleszinski's company Boss Key Productions on trailers and soundtracks for a game called LawBreakers.

=== Epic Music Productions ===
Jaroslav founded Epic Music Productions in 2016. The company focuses on modern cinematic music production, mainly for trailers and soundtracks for both the music gaming industry. The company's specialty is the production of the complete audio content for new games from the soundtrack, through sound design to sound for trailers alone. Their clients are from all over the world, mainly from the USA. In the future they are planning to focus on virtual reality audio projects and new audio hardware development.

=== Beat Saber ===
Jaroslav also produced many of the tracks featured in the 2018 virtual reality rhythm game Beat Saber. It was released on May 1, 2018, and sold 100,000 copies for the first 28 days. In February 2019, Beat Games had officially sold 1 million copies across all platforms.
