= Origins (Imagine Dragons album) =

Studio album by Imagine Dragons
- Released: November 9, 2018
- Recorded: November 2017 – October 2018
- Genres: Alternative rock; electropop; pop rock
- Length: 40:03
- Labels: Kidinakorner; Polydor; Interscope
- Producers: Mattman & Robin; Alex da Kid; John Hill; Joel Little; Jorgen Odegard; Tim Randolph; Ido Zmishlany; Kygo; Imagine Dragons

Imagine Dragons chronology
Evolve (2017)	Origins (2018)	Mercury – Act 1 (2021)

Singles from Origins
- 1. "Natural" Released: July 17, 2018; 2. "Zero" Released: September 19, 2018; 3. "Machine" Released: October 31, 2018; 4. "Bad Liar" Released: November 6, 2018

Singles from Origins (Deluxe edition)
- 1. "Birds" Released: June 20, 2019

Origins is the fourth studio album by the American pop rock band Imagine Dragons, released on November 9, 2018, by Kidinakorner, Polydor Records and Interscope Records.

The album was produced by the band members themselves, Alex da Kid, Mattman & Robin, John Hill, Joel Little, Tim Randolph, and Jayson DeZuzio, who produced a majority of the band's previous effort on their third studio album, Evolve (2017), as well as Jorgen Odegard. Frontman Dan Reynolds described Origins as a "sister album" to Evolve, and that it would complete a cycle of their music.

Origins received generally mixed reviews from critics, but many claimed that the album is an improvement from Evolve. The album was preceded by four singles: "Natural", "Zero", "Machine" and "Bad Liar". The final single, "Birds", was released in June 2019 in collaboration with Italian singer-songwriter Elisa.

== Background ==
The album cover for Origins, along with several pieces of merchandise revolving around the album were leaked online on October 2, 2018. The following day, Imagine Dragons officially announced the album to the public with a trailer. Within the trailer, the band spoke about why they were releasing a new album so soon after their previous album Evolve, along with just finishing the Evolve World Tour in September 2018. Lead singer Dan Reynolds stated that although bands typically take a break for a while after touring, the band had already written songs that felt right to produce and release immediately, as they would be in a completely different place in the future. The end of the Evolve World Tour immediately concluded the Evolve album cycle, and began the Origins album cycle.

== Composition ==
Origins has been described as an alternative rock album with an electropop sound. Hannah Mylrea of NME described the album as "stuffed full of stadium-filling slices of the band's trademark electronic infused pop-rock", while Stephen Thomas Erlewine of AllMusic stated that he felt the band attempted to make Origins blend in with rock, pop, electronic, and soul music playlists.

== Promotion ==
The group announced the title of their fourth album on October 3, 2018, via social media. The album was put up for pre-order that same day. There are three versions of the album: a standard version which includes 12 songs, a deluxe edition which includes 15 songs, and an international deluxe edition which includes 16 songs.

On October 20, 2018, the band revealed the track listing for the standard version of the album on Twitter. The next day, they revealed the track listing for the deluxe album.

== Singles ==
On July 17, 2018, "Natural" was released as the lead single. To promote the single, it was chosen by ESPN as the anthem of the 2018 College Football season. The song has since peaked at No. 13 on the Billboard Hot 100. Its music video starring the band was released on August 24, 2018.

On September 19, 2018, "Zero" was released as the second single. The song is featured in the Disney animated film Ralph Breaks the Internet and was included in its second official trailer, along with the ending credits for the film. The music video, which takes place in an arcade and includes several references to the film, was released on October 23, 2018. The song peaked at No. 10 on the Billboard Hot Rock Songs chart.

On October 31, 2018, Imagine Dragons released the third single of the album, "Machine".

On November 6, 2018, "Bad Liar" was released as the fourth single. The song has since peaked at No. 56 on the Billboard Hot 100. A music video for the song was released on January 24, 2019.

On June 20, 2019, Imagine Dragons released the fifth single of the album, "Birds", featuring Italian singer Elisa. The original album version of the song had already charted in some countries earlier that month. An animated music video for the original song was released on July 24, 2019.

== Critical reception ==
Professional ratings
Aggregate scores
Source	Rating
AnyDecentMusic?	4.8/10
Metacritic	59/100
Review scores
Source	Rating
AllMusic	3/5 stars
The Daily Campus	3.5/5 stars
Digital Journal	A
The Guardian	2/5 stars
The Heights	3.5/5 stars
The Independent	4/5 stars
The Irish Times	2/5 stars
Newsday	3.5/4 stars
NME	2/5 stars
Pitchfork	5.3/10

Origins received mixed reviews from music critics. At Metacritic, which assigns a normalized rating out of 100 to reviews from mainstream critics, the album received an average score of 59, based on 10 reviews, which indicates "mixed or average reviews". The Independent gave the album a positive review, stating that "Origins is further proof of Reynolds' pop songwriting capabilities and also his ambition when it comes to pushing the messages that matter onto the charts. And there's no doubting his sincerity. It's a refreshing quality in a pop frontman." Newsday also gave the album a positive review, saying this: "It's no wonder that "Origins" sounds like the start of something even bigger for Imagine Dragons." Digital Journal gave the album a highly positive review, saying "Overall, the new Imagine Dragons album is highly eclectic. There is something in it for every music fan. Dan Reynolds and the band never disappoint." The Heights gave the album a positive review, stating "While the album may sound bombastic and derivative to critics, Origins' eclectic song list is sure to be an instant crowd-pleaser and will impress in the inevitable stadium tour." Another positive review came from The Daily Campus, which stated that "Imagine Dragons has once again shown why they are one of the most popular rock bands in the world with "Origins" including a plethora of contagious rock-pop anthems that will have fans singing their hearts out across the country."

A more mixed review came from AllMusic, which noted that "the group takes pains to be able to fit onto every kind of playlist imaginable: rock, pop, electronic, soul-any popular sound that can be sculpted and shaped by a streaming service" and that "everything sounds vaguely familiar, vaguely connected, all designed to function as a soundtrack to whatever task you'd like". Pitchfork also gave the album a mixed review, stating "Reynolds has a story to tell, but the music fails to be the ideal delivery system." The Guardian gave the album a negative review, stating that "the most streamed rock band in the world may want us to believe that they are angry philosophers, but the reality doesn't change a gilt-edged mainstream formula." The Irish Times was also strongly critical, lambasting the album as a "muddled and incoherent mess with all of the best intentions". NME also gave a negative review, stating "scattershot and uninspired, 'Origins', the fourth album from the bafflingly popular Imagine Dragons, make for a grueling listen."

== Commercial performance ==
Origins debuted at number two on the US Billboard 200 with 91,000 album-equivalent units (including 61,000 pure album sales), making it the band's fourth top two album and their third album to debut at number 2. As of August 31, 2021, the album has been certified Platinum in the United States by the Recording Industry Association of America (RIAA) for sales of 1 million units in the country alone.

== Track listing ==
All tracks are written by Dan Reynolds, Wayne Sermon, Ben McKee, and Daniel Platzman. Additional writers are included below.

No.	Title	Writer(s)	Producer(s)	Length
1.	"Natural"	Robin Fredriksson; Mattias Larsson; Justin Tranter	Mattman & Robin	3:09
2.	"Boomerang"	Jorgen Odegard	Odegard	3:08
3.	"Machine"	Alexander Grant	Alex Da Kid	3:02
4.	"Cool Out"	Tim Randolph	Mattman & Robin; Randolph	3:38
5.	"Bad Liar"	Odegard; Aja Volkman	Odegard	4:21
6.	"West Coast"		Imagine Dragons	3:37
7.	"Zero"	John Hill	Hill	3:31
8.	"Bullet in a Gun"	Grant; Jayson DeZuzio	Alex Da Kid; DeZuzio	3:25
9.	"Digital"	Grant	Alex Da Kid	3:21
10.	"Only"	Fredriksson; Larsson; Tranter	Mattman & Robin	3:01
11.	"Stuck"	Grant; DeZuzio	Alex Da Kid; DeZuzio	3:10
12.	"Love"	Ido Zmishlany	Zmishlany	2:46
Total length:				40:03

Deluxe edition and Japanese edition bonus tracks
No.	Title	Writer(s)	Producer(s)	Length
13.	"Birds" (solo or with Elisa)	Joel Little	Little	3:39
14.	"Burn Out"		Imagine Dragons	4:33
15.	"Real Life"	Randolph	Randolph	4:08
Total length:				52:21

International deluxe edition
No.	Title	Writer(s)	Producer(s)	Length
16.	"Born to Be Yours" (with Kygo)	Kygo	Kygo	3:13
Total length:				55:34

== Personnel ==
Credits for "Origins" adapted from the album's liner notes as well as Tidal.

Imagine Dragons

- Dan Reynolds – lead vocals (all tracks); additional backing vocals (tracks: 1–10 and 12), keyboards (tracks: 2–5 and 9–12), acoustic guitar; engineering (tracks 2, 8, 9 & 11)
- Wayne Sermon – electric guitar, acoustic guitar, violin, backing vocals; engineering (tracks 4 & 5)
- Ben McKee – bass guitar, keyboards, backing vocals
- Daniel Platzman – drums, viola, percussion, backing vocals

Production

- Alex da Kid – executive production; production, programming (tracks 3, 7, 9, 11)
- Mattman & Robin – production, engineering (tracks 1, 4, 10)
- Jorgen Odegard – production (tracks 2, 5); mixing (tracks 2)
- Tim Randolph – production (tracks 4 & 15)
- Ido Zmishlany – production, engineering (track 12)
- Joel Little – production (track 13)
- Kygo – production, vocals (track 16)
- Elisa – vocals (track 13)
- Serban Ghenea – mixing (tracks 1, 4–7, 10)
- Manny Marroquin – mixing (tracks 3, 8, 9, 11)
- Mark Needham – mixing (track 12)
- John Hanes – mix engineering (tracks 1, 4–7, 10)
- Rob Cohen – engineering (track 7)
- Tyler Spratt – assistant mixing engineering (track 12)
- Randy Merrill – mastering (all tracks)
- Beeple – cover art
- Dina Hovsepian – design & layout
- Eric Ray Davidson – photography
- Max Reynolds – management
- Robert Reynolds – legal
- Corrie Martin – booking
- James Whitting – U.K./Europe booking
- Hillary Siskind – press
- Matt LaMottw – marketing

== Charts ==
=== Weekly charts ===
Chart (2018–2019)	Peak position
Australian Albums (ARIA)	4
Austrian Albums (Ö3 Austria)	2
Belgian Albums (Ultratop Flanders)	6
Belgian Albums (Ultratop Wallonia)	7
Canadian Albums (Billboard)	1
Czech Albums (ČNS IFPI)	2
Danish Albums (Hitlisten)	6
Dutch Albums (Album Top 100)	3
Estonian Albums (Eesti Ekspress)	2
Finnish Albums (Suomen virallinen lista)	4
French Albums (SNEP)	5
German Albums (Offizielle Top 100)	6
Hungarian Albums (MAHASZ)	10
Irish Albums (IRMA)	11
Italian Albums (FIMI)	5
Japan Hot Albums (Billboard Japan)	60
Japanese Albums (Oricon)	66
Latvian Albums (LAIPA)	2
Lithuanian Albums (AGATA)	2
Mexican Albums (AMPROFON)	4
New Zealand Albums (RMNZ)	3
Norwegian Albums (VG-lista)	2
Polish Albums (ZPAV)	2
Portuguese Albums (AFP)	3
Scottish Albums (Official Charts)	13
Slovak Albums (IFPI)	1
Spanish Albums (Promusicae)	6
Swedish Albums (Sverigetopplistan)	2
Swiss Albums (Schweizer Hitparade)	2
UK Albums (Official Charts)	9
US Billboard 200	2
US Top Alternative Albums (Billboard)	1
US Top Rock Albums (Billboard)	1

=== Year-end charts ===
Chart (2018)	Position
Austrian Albums (Ö3 Austria)	57
Belgian Albums (Ultratop Flanders)	108
Belgian Albums (Ultratop Wallonia)	97
Czech Albums (ČNS IFPI)	10
Dutch Albums (MegaCharts)	64
French Albums (SNEP)	75
German Albums (Offizielle Top 100)	87
French Albums (SNEP)	75
Italian Albums (FIMI)	80
Mexican Albums (AMPROFON)	67
Portuguese Albums (AFP)	64
South Korean International Albums (Gaon)	90
Swiss Albums (Schweizer Hitparade)	33

Chart (2019)	Position
Australian Albums (ARIA)	60
Belgian Albums (Ultratop Flanders)	66
Belgian Albums (Ultratop Wallonia)	59
Canadian Albums (Billboard)	22
Czech Albums (ČNS IFPI)	9
Dutch Albums (Album Top 100)	41
French Albums (SNEP)	38
German Albums (Offizielle Top 100)	62
Italian Albums (FIMI)	41
Mexican Albums (AMPROFON)	41
Polish Albums (ZPAV)	43
Spanish Albums (PROMUSICAE)	95
Swedish Albums (Sverigetopplistan)	55
Swiss Albums (Schweizer Hitparade)	16
US Billboard 200	44
US Top Rock Albums (Billboard)	5

Chart (2020)	Position
Belgian Albums (Ultratop Wallonia)	176
French Albums (SNEP)	125
US Top Rock Albums (Billboard)	69

Chart (2021)	Position
Belgian Albums (Ultratop Wallonia)	180

== Certifications ==
Region	Certification	Certified units/sales
Austria (IFPI Austria)	Platinum	15,000^{‡}
Denmark (IFPI Danmark)	Platinum	20,000^{‡}
France (SNEP)	2× Platinum	200,000^{‡}
Germany (BVMI)	Gold	100,000^{‡}
Italy (FIMI)	2× Platinum	100,000^{‡}
New Zealand (RMNZ)	2× Platinum	30,000^{‡}
Poland (ZPAV)	4× Platinum	80,000^{‡}
Singapore (RIAS)	Gold	5,000^{*}
United Kingdom (BPI)	Gold	100,000^{‡}
United States (RIAA)	Platinum	1,000,000^{‡}
^{*} Sales figures based on certification alone.^{‡} Sales+streaming figures based on certification alone.
