= Beat Saber =

Virtual reality rhythm game

- Developer: Beat Games
- Publishers: Beat Games; Oculus Studios (2019-present)
- Designers: Ján Ilavský; Vladimír Hrinčár; Peter Hrinčár
- Artist: Jan Ilavský
- Composer: Jaroslav Beck
- Engine: Unity
- Platforms: PlayStation 4; PlayStation 5; Meta Quest; SteamVR; Windows Mixed Reality
- Release: May 21, 2019
- Genre: Rhythm
- Modes: Single-player, multiplayer

Beat Saber is a virtual reality rhythm game developed by Czech studio Beat Games. The game was originally published by Beat Games before the studio was acquired by Oculus Studios in 2019. It takes place in many different surrealistic neon environments and features the player slicing blocks representing musical beats with a pair of brightly colored sabers. Following an early access release on May 1, 2018, the game was fully released for PlayStation 4 and Windows (compatible with Steam VR and Oculus VR) on May 21, 2019, and for the Meta Quest (Oculus Quest) in standalone mode. It is one of the best selling virtual reality games of all time.

== Gameplay ==
In Beat Saber, players use a pair of glowing sabers to cut through approaching blocks which are in sync with a song's beats and notes.

The player uses VR controllers to relocate a pair of glowing sabers, which by default are colored red and blue for left and right respectively, although the colors are changeable to any color. In each song, the game presents the player with a stream of approaching blocks laid out in sync with the song's beats and notes, located in one of the 12 possible positions of a 4x3 grid. Each one may also be marked with an arrow indicating one of eight possible directions in which the block may be required to be cut through. There are also blocks with dots instead of arrows, which players may hit in any direction from the sides (not poked through the dot). When a block is properly cut by a saber, it is destroyed and a score is awarded, based on the length and angle of the swing and the accuracy of the cut. In addition, there are sometimes bombs that the player should not hit, and obstacles in the form of oncoming walls that the player's head should avoid. The term "map" refers to the layout of these blocks, walls, and bombs in a song.

Underneath the path where the blocks travel is a white "energy bar," also called "battery". At the beginning of every song, the bar is halfway full, slowly filling up as the player hits notes correctly. If the player makes mistakes, such as hitting a note in the incorrect direction or with the wrong saber, missing a note, hitting a bomb, or running into a wall, the bar will decrease. If the bar becomes empty, the level will end.

Since the addition of Original Soundtrack (OST) 5, two new mechanics were introduced to the game. One of them features a new block called a Chain, which starts with a block which indicates which direction to cut. After the lead slice, there are several smaller blocks which can be cut. The other new mechanic is the Arc, a line showing the recommended path for a saber to follow. It is connected to a block and continues on until it either connects to another block or stops altogether. Both of these new mechanics calculate score differently than the original blocks.

Before the start of each song, the game offers the option to enable Modifiers. These are options that affect different aspects of gameplay, such as the presence of bombs, or the speed at which the song plays. Modifiers can either increase or lower the player's rank depending on the impact on difficulty. For example, the "No Fail" modifier allows the player to complete the song without fail if the energy bar depletes, but the final rank will be lowered. The "Super Fast Song" modifier will increase the player's rank, but the song will progress at 150% speed.

In 2024, songs with explicit lyrics were added to the game. Players ages 13 and over may choose to remove or include uncensored explicit songs in the game settings. Players between the ages of 10 and 12 using a child account have explicit songs removed by default.

== Development ==
Work on Beat Saber began after the completion of Hyperbolic Magnetism's previous title, Chameleon Run. Slovak developers Vladimír Hrinčár and Ján Ilavský began creating demos and prototypes, and some of these were posted on Facebook. Czech composer Jaroslav Beck saw some of these prototypes and met the team in Prague to convince them to let him create the soundtrack for the game. After around two years of development, the game was released in early access on May 1, 2018. Hyperbolic Magnetism changed its name to Beat Games.

== Release ==
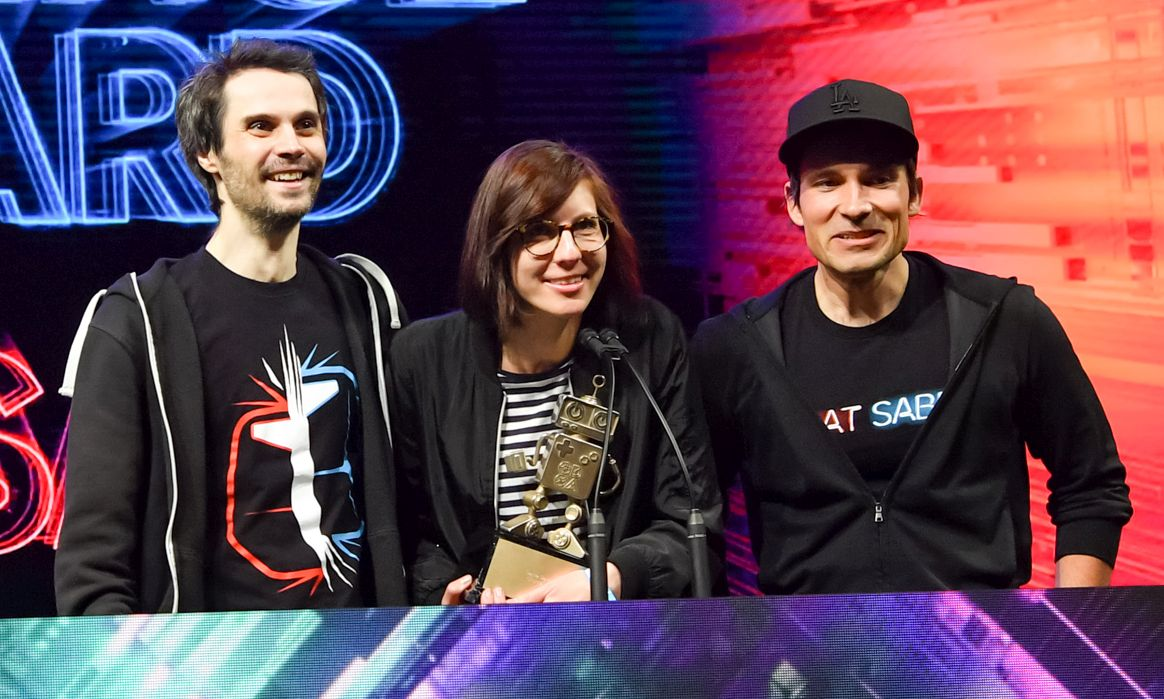
L-R: programmer Vladimir "Loki" Hrinčár, head of marketing Michaela Dvořáková, and composer Jaroslav Beck at the Game Developers Choice Awards 2019

The game was first released in early access on Windows on May 1, 2018. The game was released on PlayStation 4 on November 20, 2018. An editor was announced for release in May 2018, which would allow for the creation of custom user songs, but it was postponed, and added in May 2019.

In March 2019, Beat Games released its first paid song pack, featuring 10 songs from electronic music record label Monstercat. "Crab Rave" was added as a free update on April Fools' Day that year. On May 2, 2019, to celebrate the game's first anniversary, a prototype version created three years prior was released to the public as Beat Saber Origins. The game was fully released out of early access on PC on May 21, 2019. On January 29, 2020, the game received a free pack featuring three songs by Japanese artist Camellia. Many other songs and song packs, both paid and free, were released afterwards in updates.

Facebook via Oculus Studios acquired Beat Games in November 2019. The company stated that the purchase would not affect future development of Beat Saber on third-party VR platforms besides Oculus. Beat Games will continue to operate in Prague as an independent studio, although under the umbrella of Oculus Studios.

In December 2024, a 17-song Metallica song pack was released.

On June 18, 2025, Beat Games announced that support for PlayStation VR and PlayStation VR2 would be discontinued with no new music packs being released, and multiplayer support being dropped in January 2026.

== Reception ==
Reception

Aggregate score
Aggregator	Score
Metacritic	PS4: 86/100; PC: 93/100

Review scores
Publication	Score
Edge	8/10
Game Informer	9/10
GameSpot	8/10
IGN	9.5/10
Jeuxvideo.com	17/20
PlayStation Official Magazine – UK	8/10
Road to VR	8.9/10
UploadVR	8.5/10

During its early access phase, Beat Saber received numerous positive reviews, becoming the highest rated game on Steam less than a week after its early access release. The game sold over a million copies by March 2019. By February 2021, the game had sold over 4 million copies and 40 million songs have been sold through paid DLC.

Edge thought the game was an excellent fit for VR as a medium, writing "At this point in virtual reality's development, it's still rare to encounter a game that feels native to the technology. Beat Saber is an exception." IGN noted that while the game "doesn't push the limits of [VR tech] too far", it is extremely effective at communicating the appeal of VR, and considered the game "a go-to for introducing anyone to virtual reality." GameSpot noted that at launch the supported song library was "slim", but nevertheless concluded that "Beat Saber is an exhilarating rush and an exhausting game to play in the best way."

In 2025, Meta compiled its "50 best-selling paid Quest games of all time", with Beat Saber topping the list at number 1.

=== Awards ===
Year	Award	Category	Result	Ref.
2018	The Game Awards 2018	Best VR/AR Game	Nominated	
2018	Gamers' Choice Awards	Fan Favorite VR Game	Won	
2019	22nd Annual D.I.C.E. Awards	Immersive Reality Game of the Year	Won	
2019	22nd Annual D.I.C.E. Awards	Immersive Reality Technical Achievement	Nominated	
2019	SXSW Gaming Awards	Excellence in Gameplay	Nominated	
2019	SXSW Gaming Awards	Most Promising New Intellectual Property	Won	
2019	SXSW Gaming Awards	Trending Game of the Year	Nominated	
2019	SXSW Gaming Awards	VR Game of the Year	Won	
2019	Game Developers Choice Awards	Best VR/AR Game	Won	
2019	Game Developers Choice Awards	Audience Award	Won	
2019	15th British Academy Games Awards	Debut Game	Nominated	
2019	Golden Joystick Awards	Best VR/AR Game	Won	
2019	The Game Awards 2019	Best VR/AR Game	Won	
2019	The Steam Awards	The "VR Game of the Year" Award	Won	
