= Natural (Imagine Dragons song) =

Single by Imagine Dragons

from the album Origins
- Released: July 17, 2018
- Genre: Pop rock
- Length: 3:09
- Label: Kidinakorner; Interscope
- Songwriters: Mattias Larsson; Dan Reynolds; Ben McKee; Justin Tranter; Daniel Platzman; Wayne Sermon; Robin Fredriksson
- Producer: Mattman & Robin

Imagine Dragons singles chronology
"Born to Be Yours" (2018)	"Natural" (2018)	"Zero" (2018)

Music video
- "Natural" on YouTube

"Natural" is a song by American rock band Imagine Dragons, whose members co-wrote the song with Justin Tranter, Klinsmann Lucas S. Bernardo and their producers Mattman & Robin. It was released by Kidinakorner and Interscope Records on July 17, 2018, serving as the lead single from the band's fourth studio album, Origins (2018), as well as the seasonal anthem of the 2018 ESPN College Football. It became their fifth number one song on the US Hot Rock Songs chart.

== Background ==
Lead singer Dan Reynolds noted that "Natural" is about "finding yourself and being willing and able to stand up to whatever adversity comes your way". He said in a press release announcing the song: "Living in a dog-eat-dog world can bring out the worst in you, and sometimes, the best. It would be a lie to tell you I haven't become somewhat skeptical about some things in the last decade of my life. However, I believe that when you truly learn to love yourself, the judging eyes and hateful words become meaningless."

The song was chosen by ESPN as the anthem of the 2018 College Football season. It is the second time that an Imagine Dragons song was chosen, the first being "Roots" in 2015. "'Natural' embodies the energy, spirit and drama of each team's journey to the College Football Playoff, and that is why it was chosen as this year's anthem," said Emeka Ofodile, ESPN vice president of sports marketing. It is also part of the soundtrack for EA Sports' NHL 19, and it appears in the episode "Thunder Away" from Suits.

== Composition ==
"Natural" is a pop rock song which features a "mix of explosive drums and inspiring lyrics", with "stadium-rocking instrumentation" over the chorus.

== Critical reception ==
Markos Papadatos of Digital Journal regarded "Natural" as a "well-crafted and well-produced song", writing that "Reynolds' voice is impressive, raw and powerful", and that the song "garners two thumbs up". Sam Tornow of Billboard described the song as "ferocious" and "smash-mouth". Mike Wass of Idolator named the song a "radio-ready anthem", expecting it to be "another smash" following the success of the band's third studio album Evolve (2017). Tiana Timmerberg of Radio.com called the song "energetic and inspiring", deeming it "a feel-good jam with positive and empowering lyrics".

== Music video ==
A music video for the song was released on August 24, 2018. It depicts frontman Dan Reynolds as the apparent owner of a spooky house including shots of a woman in a bathtub, the same woman being pursued by other inhabitants of the house and an abnormally tall man resembling Slenderman, a supposed funeral for the woman, bandmates Wayne Sermon, Ben McKee and Daniel Platzman fading into dust, Reynolds digging a grave and burying the woman alive, and other shots of the house and its inhabitants, along with a clip of a lion mauling a zebra. Its music video has received over 600 million views and 5 million likes on YouTube.

== Live performances ==
On July 18, 2018, Imagine Dragons performed the song at the Isleta Amphitheater in Albuquerque New Mexico during the Evolve World Tour (2017-2019). The next day on July 19, 2018, Imagine Dragons made a live television debut of the single on Jimmy Kimmel Live!. The performance featured a guitar solo by lead guitarist Wayne Sermon that expanded on the studio recording.

== Personnel ==
Credits adapted from Tidal.

- Mattman & Robin – production, engineering
- Serban Ghenea – mixing

== Charts ==
=== Weekly charts ===
Chart (2018–2019)	Peak position
Argentina (Argentina Hot 100)	96
Australia (ARIA)	28
Austria (Ö3 Austria Top 40)	9
Belarus Airplay (Eurofest)	1
Belgium (Ultratop 50 Flanders)	5
Belgium (Ultratop 50 Wallonia)	42
Bolivia (Monitor Latino)	10
Canada Hot 100 (Billboard)	12
CIS Airplay (TopHit)	4
Canada CHR/Top 40 (Billboard)	36
Canada Hot AC (Billboard)	21
Croatia International Airplay (Top lista)	19
Czech Republic Airplay (ČNS IFPI)	2
Czech Republic Singles Digital (ČNS IFPI)	2
Estonia (Eesti Tipp-40)	33
France (SNEP)	31
Germany (GfK)	16
Greece International (IFPI)	22
Hungary (Editors' Choice Top 40)	17
Hungary (Single Top 40)	5
Hungary (Stream Top 40)	3
Ireland (IRMA)	35
Italy (FIMI)	48
Netherlands (Dutch Top 40)	6
Netherlands (Single Top 100)	17
New Zealand (Recorded Music NZ)	37
Norway (VG-lista)	9
Poland Airplay (ZPAV)	4
Portugal (AFP)	5
Puerto Rico (Monitor Latino)	19
Romania (Airplay 100)	50
Russia Airplay (TopHit)	4
Scottish Singles Sales (Official Charts)	44
Slovakia Airplay (ČNS IFPI)	1
Slovakia Singles Digital (ČNS IFPI)	4
Slovenia (SloTop50)	8
South Korea International (Gaon)	87
Spain (Promusicae)	74
Sweden (Sverigetopplistan)	39
Switzerland (Schweizer Hitparade)	3
UK Singles (Official Charts)	49
Ukraine Airplay (TopHit)	2
US Billboard Hot 100	13
US Adult Contemporary (Billboard)	28
US Adult Pop Airplay (Billboard)	4
US Pop Airplay (Billboard)	11
US Hot Rock & Alternative Songs (Billboard)	1
US Rock & Alternative Airplay (Billboard)	1

2026 weekly chart performance
Chart (2026)	Peak position
Vietnam Hot 100 (Billboard)	39

=== Year-end charts ===
Chart (2018)	Position
Austria (Ö3 Austria Top 40)	52
Belgium (Ultratop Flanders)	40
Canada (Canadian Hot 100)	89
CIS (Tophit)	54
Hungary (Single Top 40)	30
Iceland (Plötutíóindi)	83
Netherlands (Dutch Top 40)	18
Netherlands (Single Top 100)	64
Poland (ZPAV)	31
Portugal (AFP)	46
Russia (Tophit)	69
Switzerland (Schweizer Hitparade)	24
US Billboard Hot 100	69
US Adult Top 40 (Billboard)	25
US Hot Rock Songs (Billboard)	5
US Mainstream Top 40 (Billboard)	50
US Rock Airplay (Billboard)	5
Chart (2019)	Position
CIS (Tophit)	18
France (SNEP)	136
Hungary (Single Top 40)	78
Portugal (AFP)	103
Russia Airplay (Tophit)	39
Slovenia (SloTop50)	36
Switzerland (Schweizer Hitparade)	67
Ukraine Airplay (Tophit)	5
US Adult Top 40 (Billboard)	35
US Hot Rock Songs (Billboard)	3
US Rock Airplay (Billboard)	10

=== Decade-end charts ===
Chart (2010–2019)	Position
US Hot Rock Songs (Billboard)	13

== Certifications ==
Region	Certification	Certified units/sales
Austria (IFPI Austria)	Gold	15,000^{‡}
Belgium (BRMA)	Gold	20,000^{‡}
Brazil (Pro-Música Brasil)	3× Diamond	480,000^{‡}
Canada (Music Canada)	Platinum	80,000^{‡}
Denmark (IFPI Danmark)	Platinum	90,000^{‡}
France (SNEP)	Platinum	200,000^{‡}
Germany (BVMI)	Platinum	400,000^{‡}
Italy (FIMI)	2× Platinum	200,000^{‡}
Mexico (AMPROFON)	Platinum	60,000^{‡}
New Zealand (RMNZ)	3× Platinum	90,000^{‡}
Poland (ZPAV)	4× Platinum	200,000^{‡}
Portugal (AFP)	2× Platinum	20,000^{‡}
Spain (Promusicae)	Platinum	60,000^{‡}
United Kingdom (BPI)	Platinum	600,000^{‡}
United States (RIAA)	6× Platinum	6,000,000^{‡}
^{‡} Sales+streaming figures based on certification alone.

== Release history ==
Region	Date	Format	Label	Ref.
Various	July 17, 2018	Digital download; streaming	Kidinakorner; Interscope	
United States	July 31, 2018	Alternative radio	Kidinakorner; Interscope	
United States	August 28, 2018	Contemporary hit radio	Kidinakorner; Interscope	
