= Bad Liar (Imagine Dragons song) =

Single by Imagine Dragons

from the album Origins
- Released: November 6, 2018
- Genre: Electropop
- Length: 4:21
- Label: Interscope; Kidinakorner
- Songwriters: Imagine Dragons; Aja Volkman; Jorgen Odegard
- Producer: Odegard

Imagine Dragons singles chronology
"Machine" (2018)	"Bad Liar" (2018)	"Birds" (2019)

Music video
- "Bad Liar" on YouTube

"Bad Liar" is a song by American pop rock band Imagine Dragons. It was released through Interscope and Kidinakorner records on November 6, 2018, as the fourth single from the band's fourth studio album, Origins (2018). The song was written by Ben McKee, Daniel Platzman, Dan Reynolds, and Wayne Sermon, along with Aja Volkman and Jorgen Odegard, with the latter handling production.

"Bad Liar" peaked at number 56 on the US Billboard Hot 100. It topped the charts in Czech Republic and Latvia, and reached the top 10 in Belgium, Finland, Slovakia and Switzerland; as well as the top 20 in Australia, Austria, Germany, Italy, New Zealand, Norway, Poland, Singapore and Sweden. On May 31, 2019, a "stripped" version titled "Bad Liar – Stripped" was released.

== Background ==
The song was co-written by Imagine Dragons lead vocalist Dan Reynolds and his wife Aja Volkman shortly before they separated. However, Reynolds has said the couple did not end up going through with the divorce.

The Norwegian progressive rock band Maraton pointed out that the cover image for their single "Blood Music" is the same as Imagine Dragons’ cover image for "Bad Liar", with only the coloration being different. Maraton's single was released in February 2018, while Imagine Dragons’ song dropped nine months later in November 2018. Despite the undeniable shared artwork, Maraton released a statement revealing they had purchased the artwork from the artist Beeple, but had no deal giving them exclusive rights to the photo.

== Critical reception ==
Idolator called the song a "brutally honest breakup anthem", and described it as "raw and stripped back". Billboard compared the song's lyrical heaviness to the band's track "Demons".

== Music video ==
A music video for the song was released on January 24, 2019. It was directed by Ryan Reichenfeld and was filmed at Green Valley High School, in Henderson, Nevada. The video features dancer Autumn Miller with choreography by Marissa Osato. As of February 2023, the music video has received 421 million views and 4.3 million likes.

== Live performances ==
The song was first performed live at the Cosmopolitan in Las Vegas, Nevada. It was also performed at the 2019 College Football Playoff National Championship halftime show.

== Personnel ==
- Dan Reynolds – lead vocals, keyboards
- Wayne Sermon – guitar, backing vocals
- Daniel Platzman – drums, viola, backing vocals
- Ben McKee – bass guitar, synthesizer, backing vocals
- Jorgen Odegard – production

== Charts ==
=== Weekly charts ===
Weekly chart performance for "Bad Liar"
Chart (2018–2019)	Peak position
Australia (ARIA)	20
Austria (Ö3 Austria Top 40)	13
Belgium (Ultratop 50 Flanders)	10
Belgium (Ultratop 50 Wallonia)	3
Canada Hot 100 (Billboard)	50
Czech Republic Airplay (ČNS IFPI)	1
Czech Republic Singles Digital (ČNS IFPI)	1
Finland (Suomen virallinen lista)	10
France (SNEP)	41
Germany (GfK)	16
Germany Airplay (BVMI)	1
Hungary (Single Top 40)	31
Hungary (Stream Top 40)	5
Ireland (IRMA)	36
Italy (FIMI)	16
Lithuania (AGATA)	6
Netherlands (Dutch Top 40)	9
Netherlands (Single Top 100)	36
New Zealand (Recorded Music NZ)	16
Norway (VG-lista)	17
Poland Airplay (ZPAV)	2
Portugal (AFP)	18
Scottish Singles Sales (Official Charts)	82
Singapore (RIAS)	18
Slovakia Airplay (ČNS IFPI)	1
Slovakia Singles Digital (ČNS IFPI)	2
Slovenia (SloTop50)	9
Spain (Promusicae)	80
Sweden (Sverigetopplistan)	17
Switzerland (Schweizer Hitparade)	4
UK Singles (Official Charts)	44
US Billboard Hot 100	56
US Adult Pop Airplay (Billboard)	11
US Hot Rock & Alternative Songs (Billboard)	2
US Pop Airplay (Billboard)	21
US Rock & Alternative Airplay (Billboard)	9

=== Year-end charts ===
Year-end chart performance for "Bad Liar"
Chart (2019)	Position
Australia (ARIA)	66
Austria (Ö3 Austria Top 40)	31
Belgium (Ultratop Flanders)	33
Belgium (Ultratop Wallonia)	21
France (SNEP)	101
Germany (Official German Charts)	32
Iceland (Tónlistinn)	77
Italy (FIMI)	50
Netherlands (Dutch Top 40)	55
Poland (ZPAV)	15
Portugal (AFP)	62
Slovenia (SloTop50)	15
Switzerland (Schweizer Hitparade)	13
US Adult Top 40 (Billboard)	41
US Hot Rock Songs (Billboard)	5
US Rock Airplay (Billboard)	43

== Certifications ==
Certifications for "Bad Liar"
Region	Certification	Certified units/sales
Australia (ARIA)	Platinum	70,000^{‡}
Austria (IFPI Austria)	Platinum	30,000^{‡}
Belgium (BRMA)	Gold	20,000^{‡}
Brazil (Pro-Música Brasil)	2× Diamond	320,000^{‡}
Brazil (Pro-Música Brasil) Stripped Version	Gold	20,000^{‡}
Canada (Music Canada)	Platinum	80,000^{‡}
Denmark (IFPI Danmark)	Platinum	90,000^{‡}
France (SNEP)	Platinum	200,000^{‡}
Germany (BVMI)	Platinum	400,000^{‡}
Italy (FIMI)	2× Platinum	100,000^{‡}
New Zealand (RMNZ)	3× Platinum	90,000^{‡}
Poland (ZPAV)	4× Platinum	200,000^{‡}
Portugal (AFP)	2× Platinum	20,000^{‡}
Spain (Promusicae)	Platinum	60,000^{‡}
United Kingdom (BPI)	Platinum	600,000^{‡}
United States (RIAA)	2× Platinum	2,000,000^{‡}
^{‡} Sales+streaming figures based on certification alone.

== Release history ==
Release history and formats for "Bad Liar"
Country	Date	Format	Label	Ref.
Various	November 6, 2018	Digital download	Kidinakorner; Interscope	
Italy	January 25, 2019	Contemporary hit radio	Interscope	
United States	January 29, 2019	Alternative radio	Interscope	
United States	February 5, 2019	Contemporary hit radio	Interscope	
