= DEPT =

DEPT may refer to:

- DEPT (medicine), directed enzyme prodrug therapy
- Distortionless enhancement by polarization transfer
- Céline Dept, Belgian influencer (born 1998)
- Department (disambiguation)
