= Dept =

Dept may refer to:

- Abbreviation for department
- Céline Dept (born 1999), Belgian influencer
- Distortionless enhancement by polarization transfer, a heteronuclear NMR technique
