= Political Department =

Political Department was the name of:

- Federal Department of Foreign Affairs of Switzerland, named "Federal Political Department" until 1978
- Indian Political Department, a government department in British India
- Politische Abteilung ("Political Department"), one of five departments of Nazi concentration camps

== See also ==
- Department (disambiguation)
