= 2026 FIFA World Cup final =

Football match between Spain and Argentina

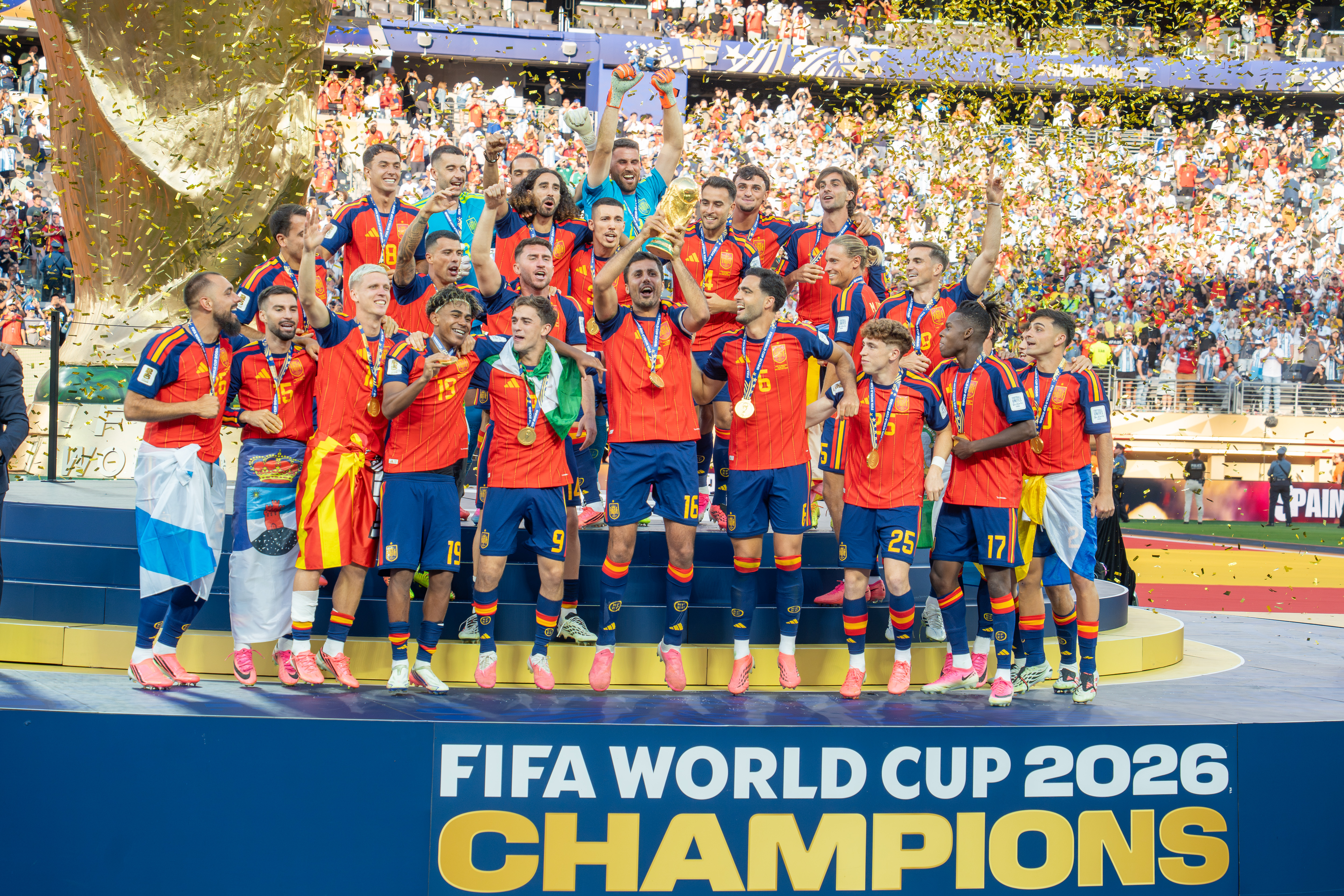
- Spain lifting the FIFA World Cup Trophy
- Event: 2026 FIFA World Cup
Spain	Argentina
1	0
- After extra time
- Date: July 19, 2026
- Venue: MetLife Stadium, East Rutherford, New Jersey
- Man of the Match: Ferran Torres (Spain)
- Referee: Slavko Vinčić (Slovenia)
- Attendance: 80,663
- Weather: Fair; 80 °F (27 °C); 40% humidity

The final match of the 2026 FIFA World Cup—the 23rd edition of the FIFA competition for men's national football teams—was played at MetLife Stadium in East Rutherford, New Jersey, part of the New York metropolitan area, on July 19, 2026. It was contested by Spain and the defending champion Argentina.

The tournament was contested by hosts Canada, Mexico, and the United States, along with 45 other teams who emerged from the qualification phase, which was organized by the six FIFA confederations. The 48 teams competed in a group stage, from which 32 teams qualified for the knockout stage. En route to the final, Spain finished first in Group H with two wins and a draw, before defeating Austria in the round of 32, Portugal in the round of 16, Belgium in the quarterfinal, and France in the semifinal. Argentina finished first in Group J with three wins, after which it defeated Cape Verde in the round of 32, Egypt in the round of 16, Switzerland in the quarterfinal, and England in the semifinal. The final took place in front of 80,663 spectators, and was refereed by Slavko Vinčić of Slovenia.

Spain dominated possession and created numerous goal-scoring opportunities throughout the match, with Argentina goalkeeper Emiliano Martínez repeatedly denying its offensive efforts. Argentina, reduced to ten players after Enzo Fernández was sent off in the second half, failed to register a single shot in regulation time, a first for a World Cup final. The goalless deadlock carried into extra time, during which Ferran Torres scored from a Nico Williams header to secure a 1–0 victory for Spain. With a few minutes left, Argentina missed multiple opportunities to equalize the score. After the match, a brawl broke out between the two teams.

Spain's win earned the country its second World Cup title and its first since 2010. Torres was named the man of the match, and Emiliano Martínez's 11 saves set a record for the most saves by a goalkeeper in a World Cup final. The match was the first ever World Cup final to include a halftime show, which caused the full halftime break to last over 27 minutes, against International Football Association Board (IFAB) protocol. Spain became the first country to simultaneously hold the men's and women's World Cup titles, having won the FIFA Women's World Cup in 2023.

== Background ==
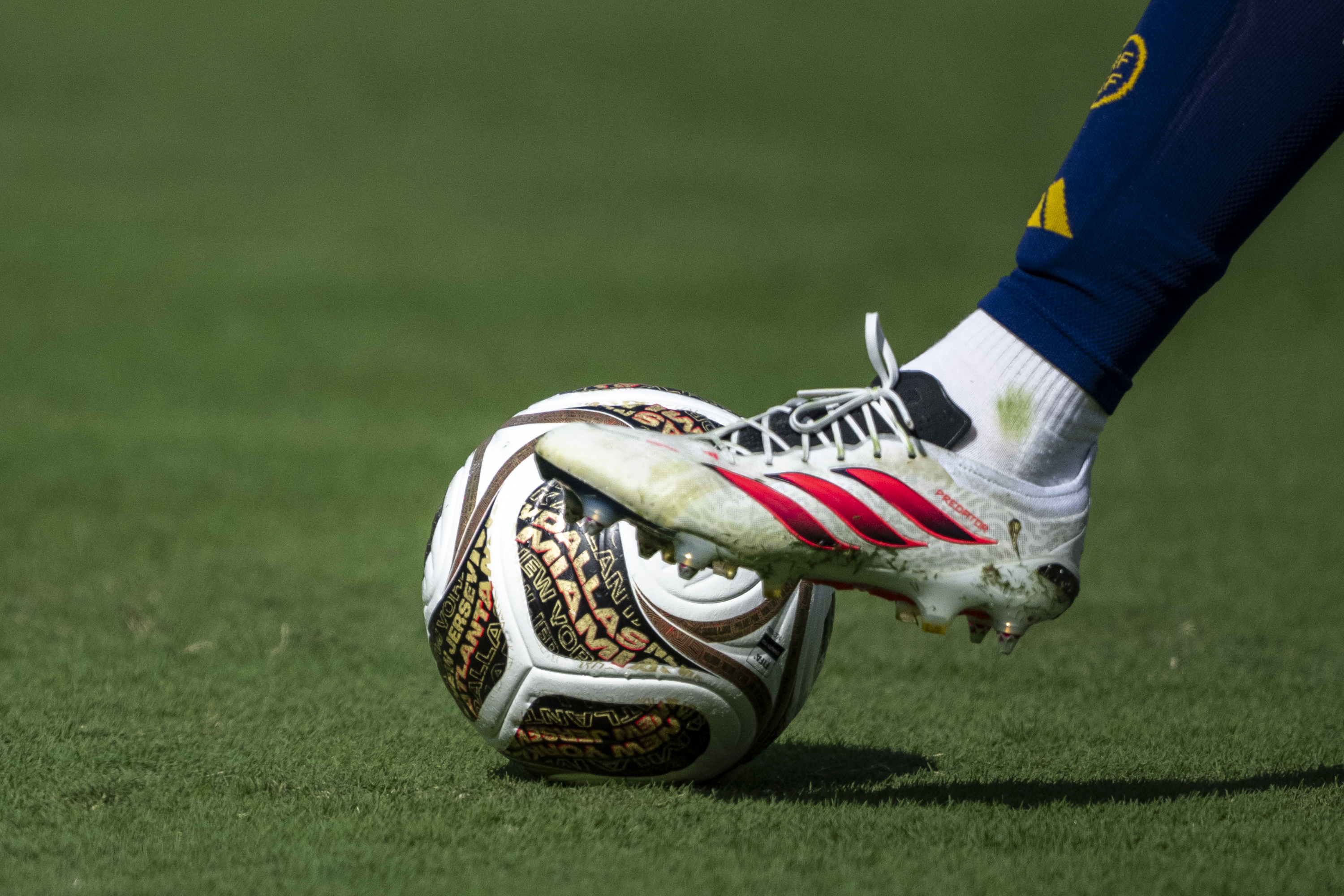
The Trionda Final ball used in the final.

The 2026 FIFA World Cup was the 23rd edition of the World Cup, FIFA's soccer competition for men's national teams, held in Canada, Mexico and the United States between June 11 and July 19, 2026. The tournament featured 48 teams for the first time, up from 32 in the 2022 World Cup. The national teams of Canada, Mexico and the United States qualified automatically for the tournament as hosts, while 206 teams competed for the remaining 45 slots through qualifying rounds organized by the six FIFA confederations and held between September 2023 and March 2026. In the tournament, the teams were divided into twelve groups of four, with each team playing every other team once in a round-robin format. The top two teams from each group, along with the top eight third-place teams, advanced to the knockout stage.

Argentina had won the previous World Cup in Qatar in 2022, defeating France in a penalty shoot-out in the final after the match finished 3–3 after extra time. Argentina had previously won the World Cup in 1978 and 1986, and finished as runners-up in 1930, 1990, and 2014. Argentina manager Lionel Scaloni was attempting to become the second manager to win multiple World Cup titles, after Vittorio Pozzo of Italy in 1934 and 1938. Spain had won the World Cup once before in 2010, defeating the Netherlands in the final in Johannesburg, South Africa. Heading into the 2026 final, Spain was tied with Italy for the longest undefeated streak in the history of men's international soccer, with 37 matches.

Spain and Argentina had played each other fourteen times since 1952, with each team winning six matches. They had played one World Cup match before, in the group stage of the 1966 tournament, with Argentina winning 2–1. Their most recent meeting before the 2026 World Cup was a friendly match in Madrid on March 27, 2018, which Spain won 6–1. Spain and Argentina, respective winners of the UEFA European Championship and Copa América in 2024, were scheduled to contest the 2026 Finalissima in Qatar in March 2026. However, the match was cancelled due to regional security concerns surrounding the Iran war.

The 2026 final was the first World Cup final to feature two reigning continental champions, who were the two top-ranked teams in the FIFA World Ranking. It was also the second time that two Spanish-speaking countries competed against each other, after Uruguay and Argentina contested the inaugural 1930 final. With Spain and Argentina co-hosting the next World Cup in 2030, it meant the winner of this final would be the first-ever team to host a World Cup as the defending champion. (Note: Attributed to multiple references:) The official match ball used in the semifinals, match for third place, and the final, was a variation of the Adidas Trionda called the Trionda Final. It has the same technical specifications as the Adidas Trionda, but has a gold, white, and black design that resembles the FIFA World Cup Trophy.

== Venue ==
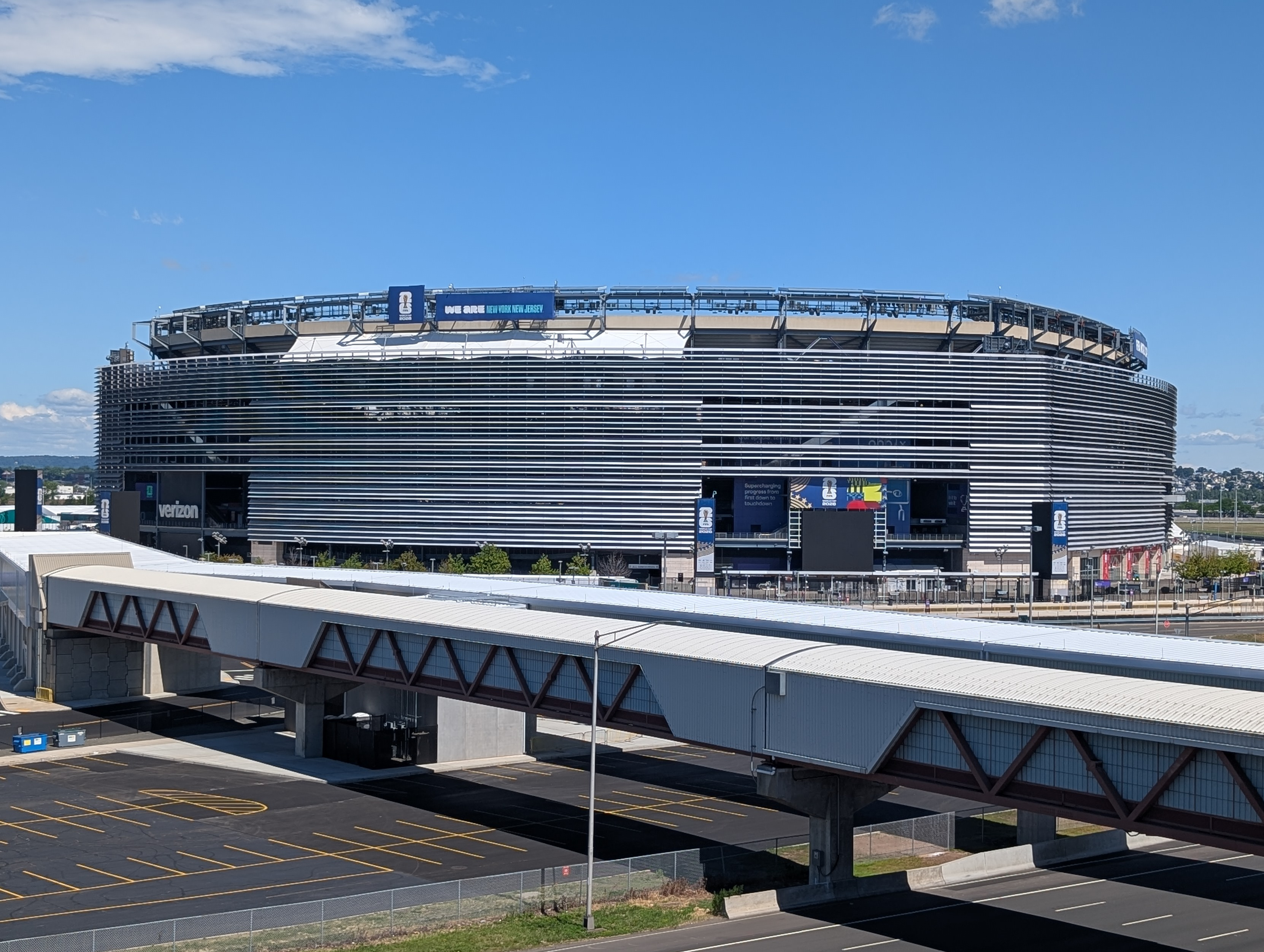
The name of MetLife Stadium (pictured in June 2026) was concealed to comply with FIFA's brand protection policy.

The final was played at MetLife Stadium in East Rutherford, New Jersey, 5 miles (8.0 km) west of New York City, which also hosted seven other matches in the tournament. MetLife Stadium was temporarily renamed New York New Jersey Stadium for the World Cup. The stadium first opened as New Meadowlands Stadium in April 2010 as a replacement for Giants Stadium. It is the home of the New York Giants and New York Jets of the National Football League (NFL) and is the largest stadium in the league, with a maximum capacity of 82,500. The stadium had previously hosted various sporting events, including multiple matches of the CONCACAF Gold Cup in 2011 and 2013, Super Bowl XLVIII in 2014, the Copa América Centenario final in 2016, and the 2025 FIFA Club World Cup final. (Note: Attributed to multiple references:)

In August 2017, the United Bid Committee of the United 2026 bid listed MetLife Stadium as a potential host venue. It was later proposed as the ideal venue for the final. After the United 2026 bid was selected in June 2018, MetLife Stadium was considered an early frontrunner to host the final due to its proximity to New York City and experience hosting major sporting events. (Note: Attributed to multiple references:) In 2021, a joint bid by New York and New Jersey was submitted for MetLife Stadium to host multiple matches during the 2026 World Cup. As part of FIFA's Candidate Host City tour, MetLife Stadium and its facilities were visited by FIFA representatives that September. In June 2022, the stadium was confirmed as one of sixteen U.S. host venues. Alongside MetLife Stadium, SoFi Stadium in California and AT&T Stadium in Texas were frontrunners to host the final. In January 2024, The Sun circulated a rumor that AT&T Stadium had been chosen. According to The Athletic, the selection of MetLife Stadium the following month came as a surprise to local officials.

The New Jersey Sports and Exposition Authority (NJSEA), which oversees MetLife Stadium, approved a $15.9 million contract to expand the stadium in June 2023. In preparation for the World Cup, the stadium's field was widened to meet FIFA's size requirements, and Bermuda grass was temporarily laid over the field's artificial turf for the World Cup. The field was later criticized by players, including Vinícius Júnior and Adrien Rabiot, both of whom said it was too dry. Worn patches on the pitch were noted by the media. The Meadowlands Rail Line and a $35 million bus line, referred to as the Secaucus-Meadowlands Transitway, were used to transport attendees from the nearest transit hub at Secaucus Junction. (Note: Attributed to multiple references:) In April 2026, NJ Transit, which operates the Meadowlands Rail Line, announced that $150 tickets, higher than the usual $12.90 fares, would be issued for train services with dedicated queues at New York Penn Station, and $80 fares for express buses. These costs were intended to offset the $48 million cost of providing event services and security that were not subsidized by FIFA and other grants. Later in May, train fares were reduced to $105 and ultimately to $98, due to increased sponsorships and other funds.

== Route to the final ==
=== Spain ===
Spain's route to the final
	Opponent	Result
1	Cape Verde	0–0
2	Saudi Arabia	4–0
3	Uruguay	1–0
R32	Austria	3–0
R16	Portugal	1–0
QF	Belgium	2–1
SF	France	2–0

Spain qualified for the 2026 World Cup after finishing first in its qualification group, and entered the tournament as the bookmakers' favorite to win. Spain was drawn into Group H, alongside Cape Verde, Saudi Arabia, and Uruguay. Its first match was against Cape Verde in Atlanta on June 15. The game ended in a goalless draw, due to a strong defensive performance from Cape Verde and its goalkeeper, Vozinha. Spain's second match was against Saudi Arabia on June 21. Lamine Yamal gave Spain the lead ten minutes into the game, scoring his first World Cup goal from a cross by Mikel Oyarzabal. Oyarzabal added a second goal from a corner kick taken by Yamal, and within three minutes he scored again from Dani Olmo's header to give Spain a 3–0 halftime lead. In the second half, a volley by Spain's Marc Cucurella was saved by Saudi Arabian goalkeeper Hassan Al Tambakti, but it deflected off Hassan Al Tambakti for an own goal to seal Spain's 4–0 victory. (Note: Attributed to multiple references:) Spain's last group game was against Uruguay in Guadalajara on June 26. Spain won 1–0 after Álex Baena's shot slipped through the hands of Uruguay goalkeeper Fernando Muslera. Spain advanced to the knockout stage as group winners with seven points.

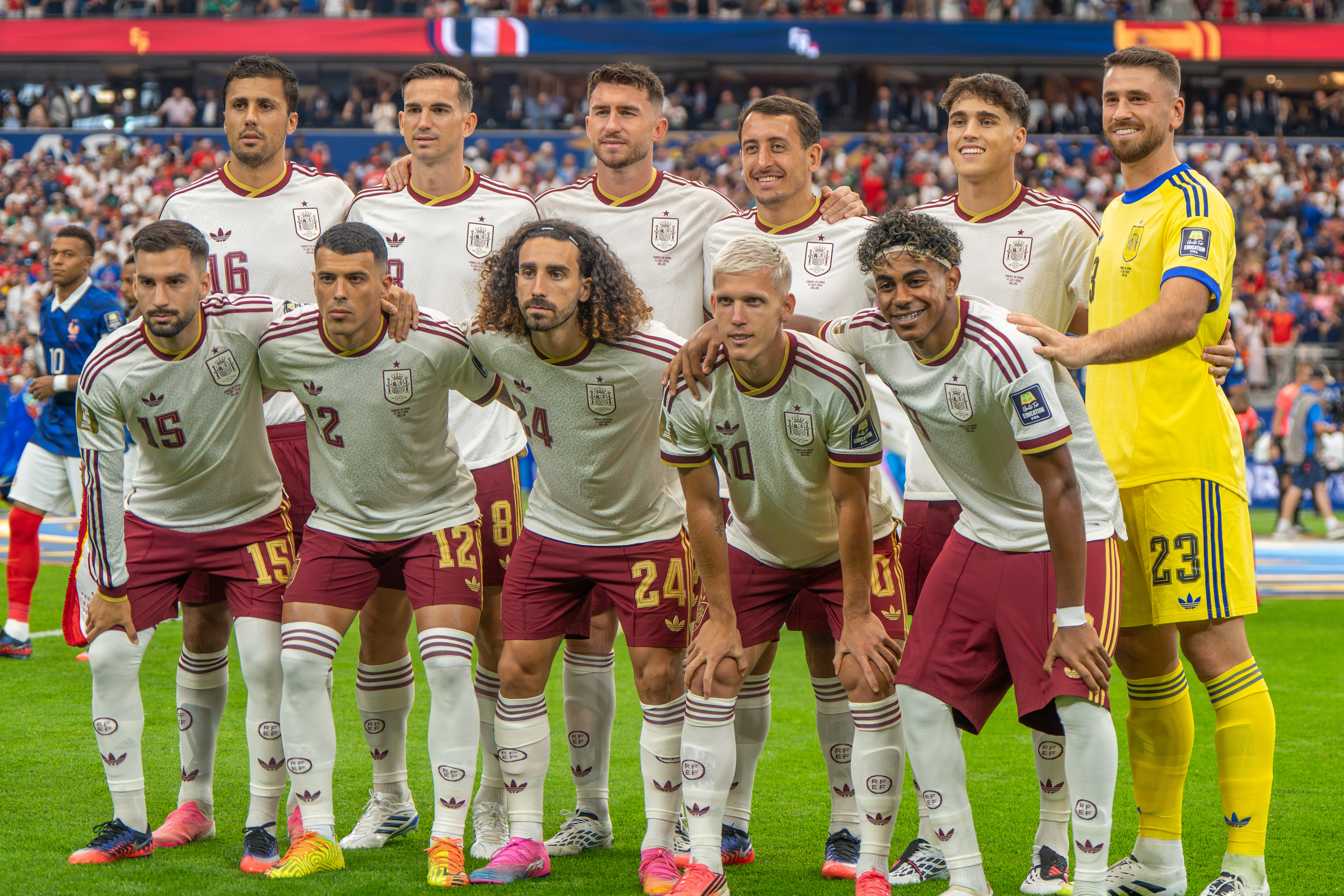
Spain's starting lineup for the semifinal against France

In the round of 32, Spain faced Austria at SoFi Stadium in Inglewood, California on July 2. Oyarzabal gave Spain a 1–0 lead in the 38th minute, scoring from a cross by Cucurella. In the second half, Pedro Porro scored Spain's second goal when he headed the ball from a cross by Baena. One minute before the end of regulation time, Oyarzabal added a third goal from a cross by Cucurella to seal a 3–0 win for Spain. Spain's victory was its first in a World Cup knockout stage match since the 2010 final.

Spain faced Portugal in the round of 16 at AT&T Stadium in Arlington, Texas on July 6. After a goalless first half, Spain's Mikel Merino, who had come on as a substitute, scored the only goal of the game in second-half stoppage time after receiving a pass from Torres. Spain faced Belgium in the quarterfinal in Inglewood on July 10. After Belgium goalkeeper Thibaut Courtois saved a shot from Dani Olmo, Fabián Ruiz scored to give Spain a 1–0 lead. Charles De Ketelaere of Belgium equalized the score at 1–1 with a header from a cross by Timothy Castagne shortly before halftime. This was the only goal conceded by Spain in the tournament. In the second half, Courtois left the pitch injured and was replaced by Senne Lammens. After Lammens saved a 25 yards (23 m) shot from Pau Cubarsi, Merino hit the rebound, scoring the winning goal two minutes before the end of regulation time to give Spain a 2–1 victory. On July 14, Spain played France in the semifinal in Dallas, and was awarded a penalty in the first half after Yamal was fouled by Lucas Digne. Oyarzabal took the penalty kick and scored to give Spain a 1–0 lead. In the 58th minute, Porro scored a second goal to give Spain a 2–0 win. Spain progressed to the final for the first time since 2010.

=== Argentina ===
Argentina's route to the final
	Opponent	Result
1	Algeria	3–0
2	Austria	2–0
3	Jordan	3–1
R32	Cape Verde	3–2 (a.e.t.)
R16	Egypt	3–2
QF	Switzerland	3–1 (a.e.t.)
SF	England	2–1

Argentina earned its World Cup berth by placing first in South American qualifiers, and entered the tournament also as one of the favorites to win. Argentina was drawn into Group J, alongside Algeria, Austria, and Jordan. In its first match against Algeria at Arrowhead Stadium in Kansas City on June 16, Argentina won 3–0 through a hat trick by Lionel Messi. Their second match was against Austria at AT&T Stadium on June 22. Argentina took the lead in the first half with a goal by Messi, who surpassed Miroslav Klose to become the all-time top goalscorer at World Cup tournaments, with 17 goals. Messi added a second goal in second-half injury time to secure Argentina a 2–0 victory. Argentina's last group game was against Jordan on June 27. Argentina won a free kick in the 19th minute, when Mohannad Abu Taha fouled Giovani Lo Celso. Celso took the kick and scored to give Argentina a 1–0 lead. After Nizar Al-Rashdan of Jordan fouled Argentina's Marcos Senesi, Lautaro Martinez scored from the penalty kick in the 30th minute, giving Argentina a 2–0 lead. In the second half, Musa Al-Taamari, who had come on as a substitute, scored once for Jordan to make the score 2–1. Messi took a free kick for Argentina after being fouled, and scored with a curling shot to give Argentina a 3–1 win. Argentina qualified as group winners with nine points.

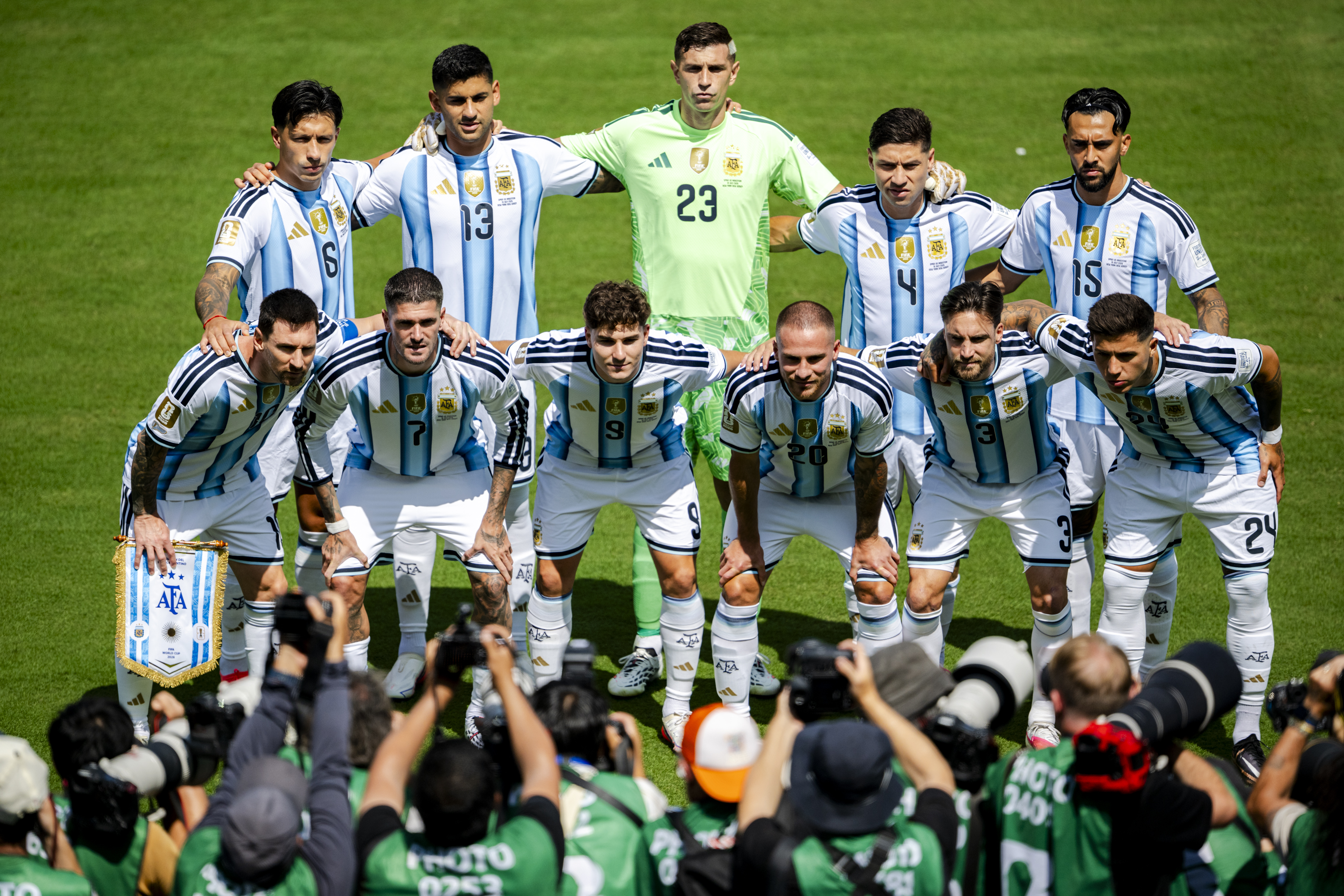
Argentina's starting lineup during the final.

Argentina faced Cape Verde in the round of 32 at Hard Rock Stadium on July 3. Argentina took the lead in the 29th minute when Messi scored from close range after a pass from Lisandro Martínez. In the second half, Cape Verde's Deroy Duarte equalized the score at 1–1 after receiving a cross from Ryan Mendes. The game went into extra time, where Argentina retook the lead after two minutes from a goal by Martínez, before Sidny Lopes Cabral of Cape Verde scored with a curling shot to even the score at 2–2 eleven minutes later. In the 111th minute, Cristian Romero's header deflected off Diney Borges's arm for an own goal, giving Argentina a 3–2 victory. In the round of 16, Argentina played Egypt in Atlanta on July 7. Egypt took the lead after fifteen minutes when Yasser Ibrahim scored with a header from a corner kick taken by Mohamed Hany. After Mostafa Ziko's goal was disallowed by the video assistant referee due to a foul, Ziko proceeded to score again in the second half to give Egypt a 2–0 lead. However, in what was described as "one of the great World Cup comebacks" by BBC Sport, Argentina scored three goals in the final fifteen minutes—with a header by Romero, a goal by Messi, and a second header by Enzo Fernández to seal Argentina's 3–2 win.

Argentina's quarterfinal was against Switzerland in Kansas City on July 11. Argentina took the lead after ten minutes when Alexis Mac Allister scored with a header. The match was tied at 1–1 in the 67th minute by Dan Ndoye of Switzerland. Five minutes later, Breel Embolo of Switzerland was sent off after being given a second yellow card for diving. Argentina eventually won 3–1 in extra time through a long-distance strike by Julián Alvarez and a rebound from Lautaro Martínez. Argentina advanced to the semifinal on July 15 in Atlanta, where it faced England, a longtime rival in the World Cup. After Anthony Gordon's goal in the 55th minute gave England the lead, England head coach Thomas Tuchel switched to a five-defender formation with several substitutions. Messi provided assists for Fernández's equalizing goal in the 86th minute and for Martínez's game-winning header goal in the second minute of stoppage time. Argentina won 2–1 to reach their second consecutive World Cup final.

== Pre-match ==
=== Officiating ===
On July 16, 2026, Slavko Vinčić of Slovenia was named as the referee for the final, with fellow Slovenians Tomaž Klančnik and Andraž Kovačič as assistant referees. Adham Makhadmeh and Mohammad Al-Kalaf of Jordan were named as the fourth official and reserve assistant referee, respectively. The VAR team consisted of Bastian Dankert, Nicolas Gallo, and Khamis Al-Marri. Tatiana Guzman and Guillermo Pacheco served as standby VARs. Earlier in the 2026 World Cup, Vinčić officiated the Brazil–Morocco and Jordan–Algeria matches in the group stage and the Mexico–Ecuador match in the round of 32. He had previously officiated the 2022 UEFA Europa League final and 2024 UEFA Champions League final. He was also one of the referees at the UEFA Euro 2020, 2022 World Cup, UEFA Euro 2024, and 2025 FIFA Club World Cup. He became the first Slovenian to referee a World Cup final.

=== Dignitaries in attendance ===
US president Donald Trump and First Lady Melania Trump attended the final with secretary of state Marco Rubio, along with Mexican president Claudia Sheinbaum, Canadian prime minister Mark Carney, and New Jersey Governor Mikie Sherrill. Sheinbaum had declined to attend previous matches to show solidarity with ordinary Mexicans unable to afford tickets, but decided to attend the final after receiving a direct invitation from Trump. Representing Spain were King Felipe VI, Queen Letizia and their daughters Leonor, Princess of Asturias and Infanta Sofía, as well as prime minister Pedro Sánchez and Rafael Louzán, president of the Royal Spanish Football Federation. Argentina's president, Javier Milei, declined to attend the match due to superstition. (Note: Attributed to multiple references:) In his place were Alejandro Domínguez, president of CONMEBOL, and Claudio Tapia, president of the Argentine Football Association (AFA). Also among the attendees were Zohran Mamdani, mayor of New York City, and Kirsty Coventry, president of the International Olympic Committee (IOC).

Although UEFA President Aleksander Čeferin attended the tournament's June 11 opening match in Mexico City, he boycotted the final after a dispute with FIFA over a suspended disciplinary ban issued to United States player Folarin Balogun. Čeferin, representing the European confederation of which Spain is a member, criticized FIFA's decision to defer Balogun's automatic suspension after he received a red card during a round of 32 match against Bosnia and Herzegovina, which the United States won 2–0.

=== Air quality concerns ===
There were concerns that smoke from the ongoing Canadian wildfires would affect the air quality of the final and impact player performance. Spain decided to practice under the smoke, while Argentina practiced in Atlanta to avoid the smoke. FIFA President Gianni Infantino met with Trump and World Cup Task Force leader Andrew Giuliani to discuss the wildfires. At the time, New York and New Jersey were under air quality alerts, and air quality readings in New York City were deemed "very unhealthy" and well above levels deemed dangerous to the general public. The day prior to the final, much of the smoke dissipated due to heavy thunderstorms, and the air quality improved to the point where there was no risk to the general public.

== Match ==
=== First half ===
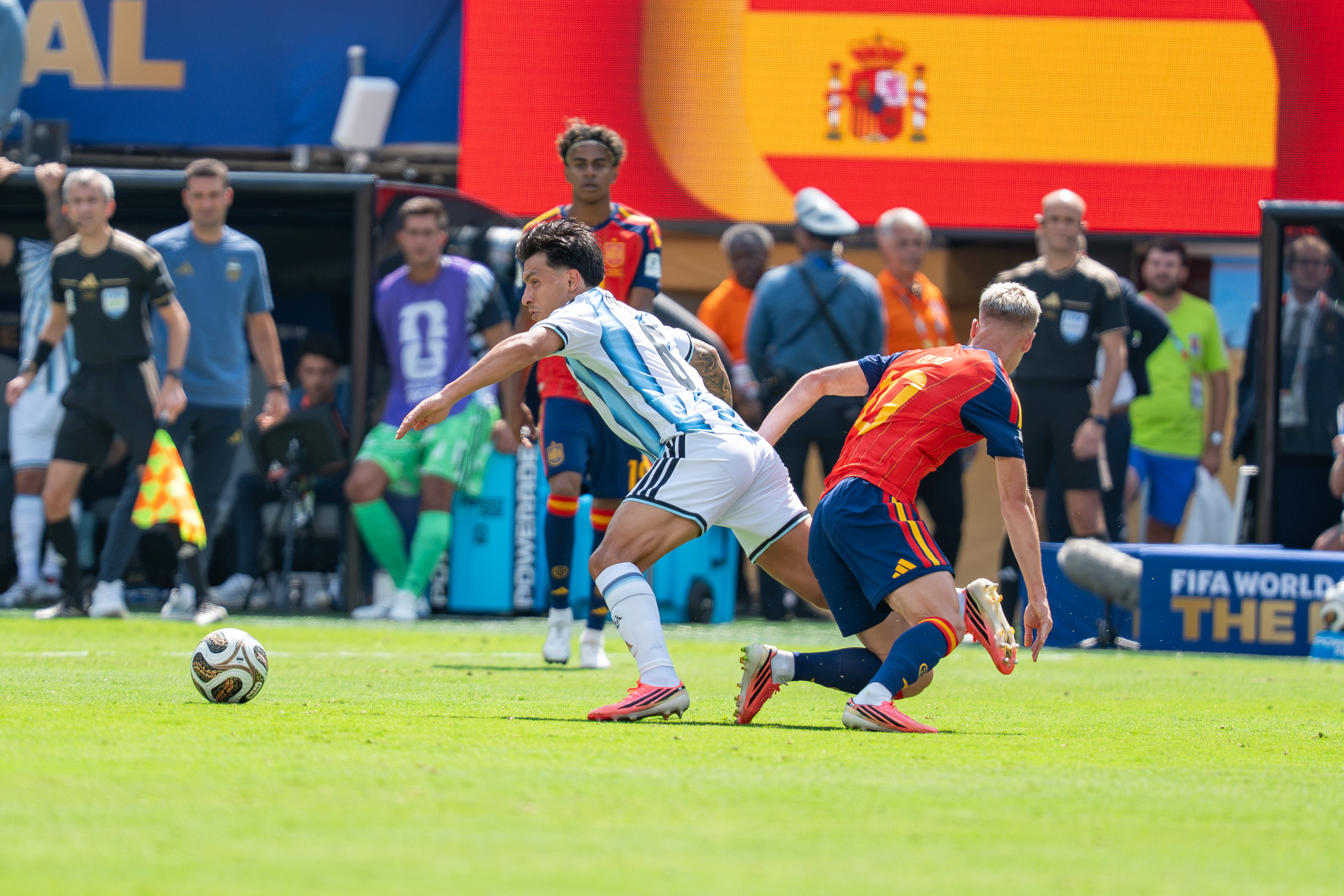
Action during the first half

Argentina kicked off the match at 3:06 p.m. EDT (7:06 p.m. UTC) in front of a crowd of 80,663. The weather at Teterboro Airport, 4.4 mi (7.1 km) from the stadium, (Note: Distance measured using Google Maps distance calculator, between Teterboro Airport, coordinates 40.8501°N 74.0608°W and MetLife Stadium, coordinates 40.8135°N 74.0743°W) was recorded as fair before kick-off, with a temperature of 80 °F (27 °C) and 40% humidity. Five minutes into the game, Lamine Yamal had a chance to score for Spain when he received a pass from Dani Olmo. He took a shot that deflected off Lisandro Martinez's foot and was saved by Argentina's goalkeeper, Emiliano Martínez. Julián Álvarez of Argentina attempted to pass the ball to Lionel Messi, but Spain's goalkeeper Unai Simón ran 40 yards (36.5 m) from the goal to outpace him and kick it away. In the 11th minute, Yamal attempted to receive the ball from a cross by Rodri, but it went out of the touchline. A minute later, Spain won a corner kick after Fabián Ruiz's shot was deflected by Emiliano Martínez in the penalty area.

Two minutes later, Alexis Mac Allister of Argentina fouled Dani Olmo. In the 15th minute, Argentina won a free kick 45 yards (41.1 m) from Spain's goal after Messi was tackled by Alex Baena. Rodrigo De Paul's kick went over the wall and was saved by Simón. In the 39th minute, Spain's Mikel Oyarzabal received a pass from Fabián Ruiz outside of the penalty area and made a 20-yard (18 m) low shot at the goal, but it was saved by Emiliano Martínez. In the 41st minute, Lisandro Martínez was given a yellow card for a foul on Oyarzabal, and a minute later a left-footed shot from Marc Cucurella went wide of the goal. Argentina was forced to make a substitution after Lisandro Martínez became injured, with Nicolás Otamendi taking his place.

=== Second half ===
The second half began with a substitution from Argentina, with Leandro Paredes replacing Nicolás Gonzalez. One minute later, Baena made a 22-yard (20 m) shot towards Argentina's goal which was saved by Emiliano Martínez. Paredes received a yellow card for pushing Rodri. In the 57th minute, Argentina brought Nahuel Molina onto the pitch in place of Gonzalo Montiel. In the 60th minute, Spain won a free kick when Paredes fouled Pedro Porro 25 yards (23 m) from Argentina's goal. Yamal took the kick and hit the wall. Spain then made two substitutions, with Pedri and Ferran Torres coming on in place of Ruiz and Oyarzabal, respectively. In the 64th minute, Olmo hit a 22-yard (20 m) shot that deflected off Martinez and went wide of the goalpost. Three minutes later, Spain had what Chris Sutton described as a "golden opportunity" when Yamal delivered a cross to Torres, who hit a goal-bound header that was saved by Martínez. In the 70th minute, Argentina made two substitutions when Giuliano Simeone and Facundo Medina replaced De Paul and Cristian Romero, respectively. Five minutes later, Spain sent Nico Williams and Mikel Merino onto the pitch in place of Baena and Olmo. In the 77th minute, Pedri made a shot from the edge of the penalty area, but it was saved by Martínez. Cubarsí then struck a 25-yard (23 m) shot at Argentina's goal, which Martinez saved with a dive.

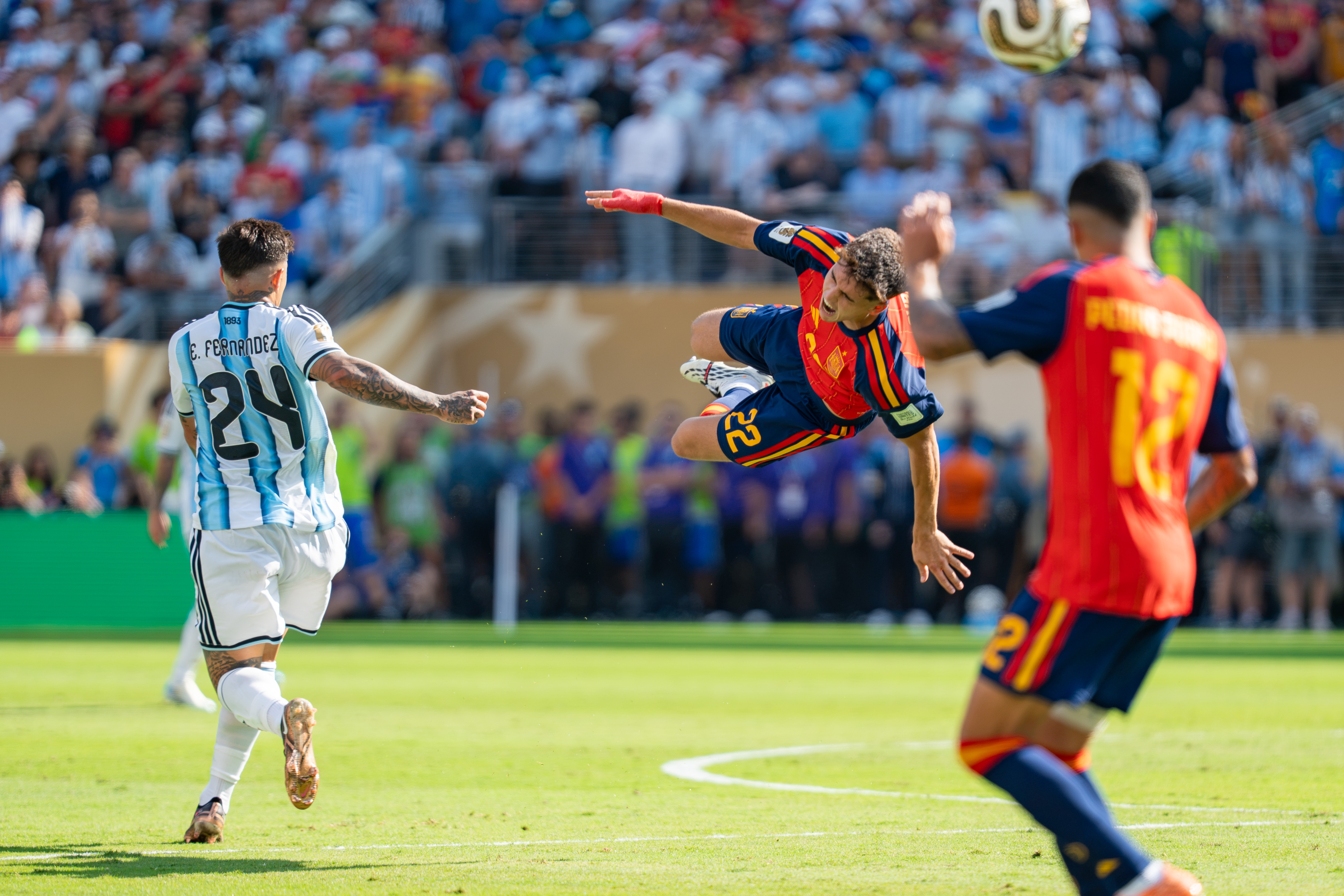
Enzo Fernández of Argentina received a second yellow card after tackling Pau Cubarsí

In the 80th minute, Nico Williams made a cross that Aymeric Laporte tried to meet with a header, but Martínez caught the ball. In the 82nd minute, Argentina's Enzo Fernández fell to the ground following contact from Rodri, and the referee did not award a foul, leading Fernández to complain and then receive a yellow card for dissent. In the 3rd minute of stoppage time, Argentina's Giuliano Simeone made a low cross from the right, but Unai Simón intercepted the ball. On the resulting counterattack, Williams dribbled the ball for 30 meters before taking a shot from the edge of the box, which was also saved by Martínez. A few minutes later, Fernández was sent off after receiving a second yellow card for tackling Pau Cubarsí while attempting to win a loose ball; a VAR review upheld the on-field decision. In the final seconds of regulation time, Yamal struck a free kick that Martínez managed to deflect away. As regulation time concluded, Argentina became the first team to fail to register a shot during the first 90 minutes of a World Cup final.

=== Extra time ===
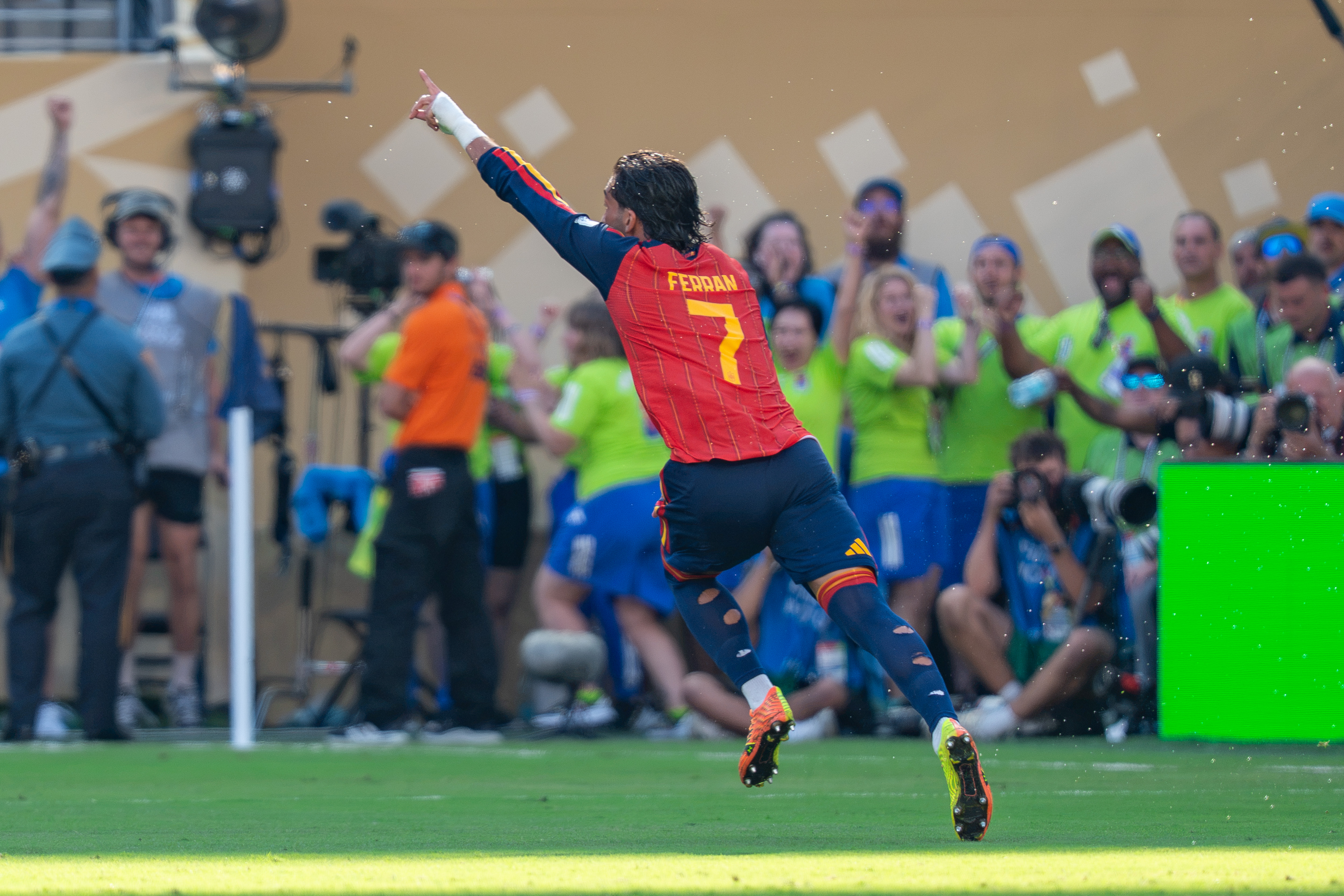
Ferran Torres of Spain, after scoring the game's only goal

In the 93rd minute of the match during extra time, Williams was not able to head a Pedri cross with enough power, and Martínez dove to his right to make the save. Three minutes later, Williams appeared to score, but the goal was disallowed because Merino had stepped on Otamendi's foot. Commentators noted that the contact was minor and was the type that referees sometimes overlook in the penalty area, and also observed that Otamendi had his arm around Merino prior to the incident. (Note: Attributed to multiple references:) Spain supporters sarcastically chanted "Infantino" following the disallowed goal, referencing allegations of FIFA favoring Argentina.

Merino then headed the ball wide of Argentina's goal in the 102nd minute. At the start of the second period of extra time, Torres received a ball headed by Williams. He struck it with his left foot from close range and past Martínez, scoring the first goal of the match and putting Spain in the lead 1–0.

After Spain's goal, Argentina began to counterattack in search of an equalizer goal. In the 113th minute, Torres appeared to score his second goal, but it was ruled out for being offside. Two minutes later, Messi attempted to catch Simón off guard with a cross that drifted toward the Spanish goal, passing over the crossbar. In the 116th minute, Williams positioned himself in Argentina's box after outrunning Nahuel Molina, but was unable to connect with the ball to shoot. A minute later, Messi made Argentina's first shot from the edge of the box, which struck Merino in the face as he blocked it, leaving him down on the pitch.

In the 120th minute, Argentina's final attack came from a Giuliano Simeone pass toward Marcos Senesi in the box, but Cubarsí cleared the ball. The resulting corner kick led to a scramble inside the goal area, with the Spanish defense kicking the ball out of bounds. The next corner kick was deflected by Argentina's Nicolás Tagliafico on the near post and fell to Simeone's feet, but his shot from close to the penalty spot went well over the crossbar. In the final minutes, Spain kept possession away from its goal. A long free kick from Emiliano Martinez into Spain's goal area was cleared by its defense before the final whistle confirmed Spain's victory.

=== Details ===
July 19, 2026
3:00 p.m. UTC−4

Spain	1–0 (a.e.t.)	Argentina
Torres 106'	(Note: "Spain vs Argentina | Final | FIFA World Cup 2026". FIFA. Retrieved July 19, 2026.; "Match Report – Final – Spain v. Argentina". FIFA. July 19, 2026. Retrieved July 19, 2026.; "Post match summary report – Final – Spain v. Argentina". FIFA. July 20, 2026. Retrieved July 20, 2026.)

MetLife Stadium, East Rutherford
Attendance: 80,663
Referee: Slavko Vinčić (Slovenia)

Spain	Argentina

GK	23	Unai Simón
RB	12	Pedro Porro
CB	22	Pau Cubarsí
CB	14	Aymeric Laporte	(substituted off) 99'
LB	24	Marc Cucurella
DM	16	Rodri (c)	(substituted off) 99'
CM	10	Dani Olmo	(substituted off) 75'
CM	8	Fabián Ruiz	(substituted off) 62'
RF	19	Lamine Yamal
CF	21	Mikel Oyarzabal	(substituted off) 62'
LF	15	Álex Baena	(substituted off) 75'
Substitutions:
FW	7	Ferran Torres	(substituted on) 62'
MF	20	Pedri	(substituted on) 62'
MF	6	Mikel Merino	(substituted on) 75'
FW	17	Nico Williams	(substituted on) 75'
MF	18	Martín Zubimendi	(substituted on) 99'
DF	4	Eric Garcia	(substituted on) 99'
Manager:
Luis de la Fuente

GK	23	Emiliano Martínez
RB	4	Gonzalo Montiel		(substituted off) 58'
CB	13	Cristian Romero	(yellow card) 90+2'	(substituted off) 70'
CB	6	Lisandro Martínez	(yellow card) 41'	(substituted off) 44'
LB	3	Nicolás Tagliafico
RM	7	Rodrigo De Paul		(substituted off) 70'
CM	24	Enzo Fernández	(yellow card) 82' (yellow-red card) 90+3'
CM	20	Alexis Mac Allister	(yellow card) 111'
LM	15	Nicolás González		(substituted off) 46'
CF	10	Lionel Messi (c)
CF	9	Julián Alvarez		(substituted off) 102'
Substitutions:
DF	19	Nicolás Otamendi		(substituted on) 44'
MF	5	Leandro Paredes	(yellow card) 52'	(substituted on) 46'
DF	26	Nahuel Molina		(substituted on) 58'
DF	25	Facundo Medina		(substituted on) 70'
FW	17	Giuliano Simeone		(substituted on) 70'
DF	2	Marcos Senesi		(substituted on) 102'
Manager:
Lionel Scaloni			(yellow card) 105'

Man of the Match:
Ferran Torres (Spain)

Assistant referees:
Tomaž Klančnik (Slovenia)
Andraž Kovačič (Slovenia)
Fourth official:
Adham Makhadmeh (Jordan)
Reserve assistant referee:
Mohammad Al-Kalaf (Jordan)
Video assistant referee:
Bastian Dankert (Germany)
Assistant video assistant referee:
Nicolás Gallo (Colombia)
Support video assistant referee:
Khamis Al-Marri (Qatar)

Match rules

- 90 minutes
- 30 minutes of extra time if necessary
- Penalty shoot-out if scores still level
- Maximum of fifteen named substitutes
- Maximum of five substitutions, with a sixth allowed in extra time
- Maximum of three substitution opportunities, with a fourth allowed in extra time
- Maximum of one concussion substitution, granting the opposition an additional standalone substitution

=== Statistics ===
Overall statistics
Statistic	Spain	Argentina
Goals scored	1	0
Total shots	20	2
Shots on target	12	0
Ball possession	65%	35%
Corner kicks	9	4
Fouls committed	21	25
Offsides	4	1
Yellow cards	0	7
Red cards	0	1

== Post-match ==
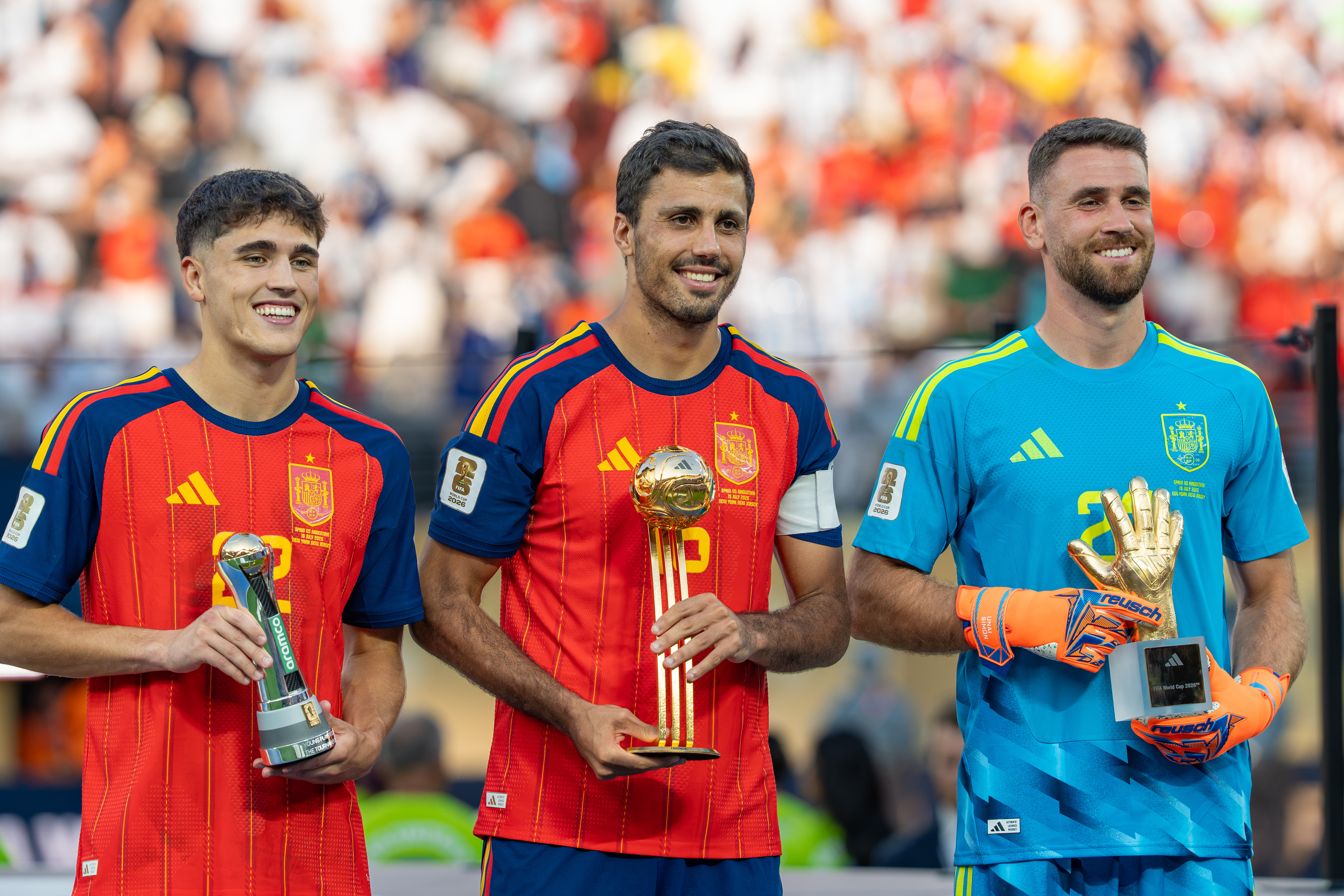
Spain's players with their awards, pictured from left to right: Pau Cubarsí (Young Player Award), Rodri (Golden Ball), and Unai Simón (Golden Glove)

Spain's Ferran Torres, who scored the only goal of the final, was named as the man of the match. In the awards ceremony after the match, Spain's Rodri was awarded the Golden Ball as the best player of the tournament, while his teammate Unai Simón was awarded the Golden Glove as the best goalkeeper. Spain's Pau Cubarsí won the FIFA Young Player Award as the best young player of the tournament. Lionel Messi won the Silver Ball as the second-best player of the tournament, and the Silver Boot as the second-top goalscorer, with eight goals. FIFA president Gianni Infantino and US president Donald Trump were booed by some spectators as they entered the field with the World Cup trophy, which they presented to Spain's captain Rodri.

Lamine Yamal and Messi embraced after the match, a moment described by FIFA and several media outlets as symbolic of a generational transition in football, with Messi approaching the end of an illustrious career and Yamal, regarded as one of the sport's most promising talents, at the start of his. The encounter drew additional resonance from a 2007 photograph in which Messi, then 20 years old, bathed the infant Yamal during a charity photo session while at FC Barcelona. The image had attracted renewed media attention as the two players prepared to face each other in the 2026 World Cup final.

Spain became the first country to simultaneously hold both the men's and women's World Cup titles, having won the Women's World Cup in 2023. Spain also became the second European nation to win a World Cup held in the Americas, following Germany in 2014. Messi became the second player in history to play in three World Cup finals, after Cafu of Brazil. The 2026 final featured 11 saves by Argentina goalkeeper Emiliano Martínez, the most ever recorded in a World Cup final.

=== Altercations between players ===
After the match concluded, multiple altercations broke out between Argentina's and Spain's players. Argentina's defender Nahuel Molina was seen striking Spain's captain Rodri in the stomach, who was running to celebrate his team's victory. Shortly after, Argentina's Leandro Paredes tackled Eric Garcia, who fell to the ground, resulting in a physical altercation. Just as he was getting up, Paredes shoved him by the throat, and shortly after, Argentina's coaching staff protected Garcia from him. Paredes then wrestled Gavi to the ground, with substitute Thiago Almada getting involved as he ripped his training bib. Argentina's assistant coach Roberto Ayala grabbed Spain's Dani Olmo by the bib before punching him in the face. Multiple media outlets claimed that Paredes was shown a red card after the brawl, but FIFA's official match report states that the referee did not penalize Paredes.

Argentina's actions during and after the match were described as disgraceful by several international media outlets. Paredes was criticized for his violent behavior during and after the match, and Messi was criticized for attempting to have Marc Cucurella sent off for briefly covering his mouth after Fernández's red card. FIFA announced an investigation into the behavior of Argentine players and staff, including Paredes, Molina and Ayala. In the days that followed, Ayala apologized for his behavior and Gavi spoke against possible suspensions for his rivals. Several media outlets called Spain's win a victory for the sport of football.

=== Aftermath and reactions ===
The Spain national team returned to Madrid the next day and was welcomed at the Madrid–Barajas Airport. A World Cup victory parade took place in central Madrid, with roughly two million people in attendance. Celebrations also broke out across various other parts of Spain. In Ciudad Rodrigo, Salamanca, several revelers stood in a fountain which collapsed on them, killing a teenager and injuring three others. A 20-year-old died in Sonseca during what was reported as a convulsion. Across Spain that evening, more than 80 people were reported injured and approximately 12 arrested. In New York City, celebrations broke out in several parts of the city, including Times Square, Central Park, and Little Spain, Manhattan. In Mexico City, several Spain supporters and Mexico national team fans celebrated at the Fountain of Cybele.

In Buenos Aires, fans and government officials gathered at Ezeiza International Airport to receive the Argentina national team, where the Argentine Armed Forces performed an orchestra rendition of the football chant Muchachos, ahora nos volvimos a ilusionar (transl. Guys, we have our hopes up again) and a drone show marked their arrival. Messi and several other players did not travel to Buenos Aires, instead flying directly to their club destinations or to begin their vacations. The arriving players were transported through the city on an open-top bus, greeted by large crowds and fireworks along the route. Thousands of additional supporters gathered at the Obelisk. Riots broke out amidst the celebrations, with people throwing stones, glass bottles, and other objects at police. Riot police responded with water cannons, tear gas, and rubber bullets to disperse the crowds. Local police reported at least fifteen arrests and several injuries during the clashes.

On July 29, FIFA opened formal disciplinary proceedings against the Argentine Football Association (AFA), citing multiple infractions by the Argentina national team during the final and their semi-final match against England. On August 21, FIFA's disciplinary committee announced a 10-match ban for Leandro Paredes, a 7-match ban for Nahuel Molina, a 3-match ban for Roberto Ayala, and a 1-match ban for both Thiago Almada and Spain's Gavi, in addition to financial sanctions for all of them, with fines totaling $270,000. The committee fined the AFA $321,000 ($100,000 of which is suspended) for displaying a banner with the words "Las Malvinas son Argentinas" ("The Falklands are Argentine") during the semi-final, in reference to the territory dispute between Argentina and the United Kingdom. FIFA also sanctioned the AFA with a maximum 50% capacity for its next two home matches.

== Entertainment ==
=== Closing ceremony ===
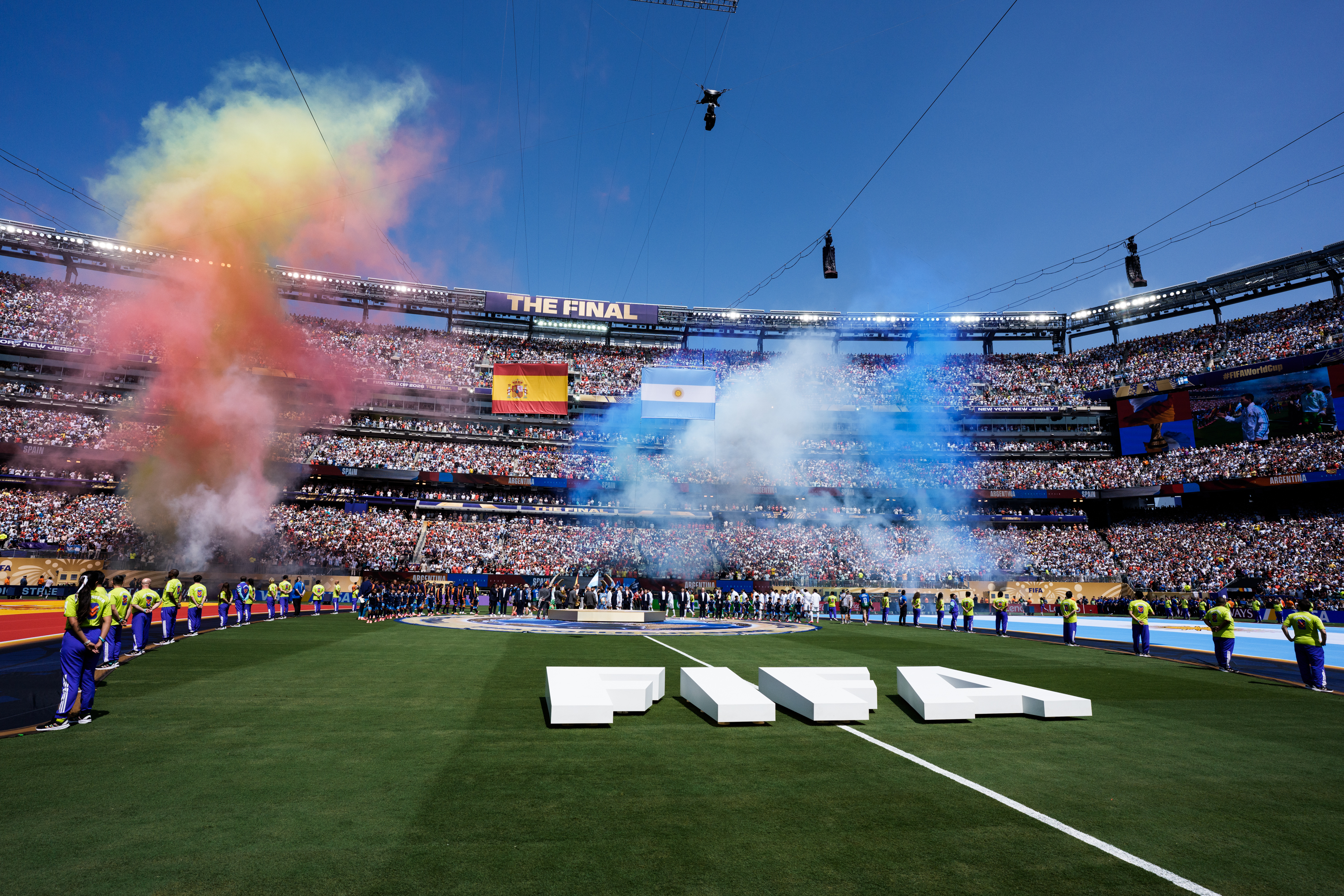
Smoke in the national colors of Spain and Argentina drifts across MetLife Stadium's pitch minutes before kickoff.

A closing ceremony for the World Cup began at 1:40 p.m. Eastern Daylight Time (UTC−4), eighty minutes before the scheduled kickoff. IShowSpeed performed his World Cup-themed song "Champions", while headliner Post Malone and rapper Swae Lee sang "Sunflower". Robbie Williams, Nicole Scherzinger and Laura Pausini performed the song "Desire". Jennifer Hudson sang the U.S. national anthem, María Becerra sang Argentina's national anthem, and the Spanish brass quintet Spanish Brass performed Spain's national anthem. Mario Kempes and Andrés Iniesta, two respective members of Argentina's and Spain's winning teams in 1978 and 2010, unveiled the FIFA World Cup Trophy. (Note: Attributed to multiple references:)

=== Halftime show ===
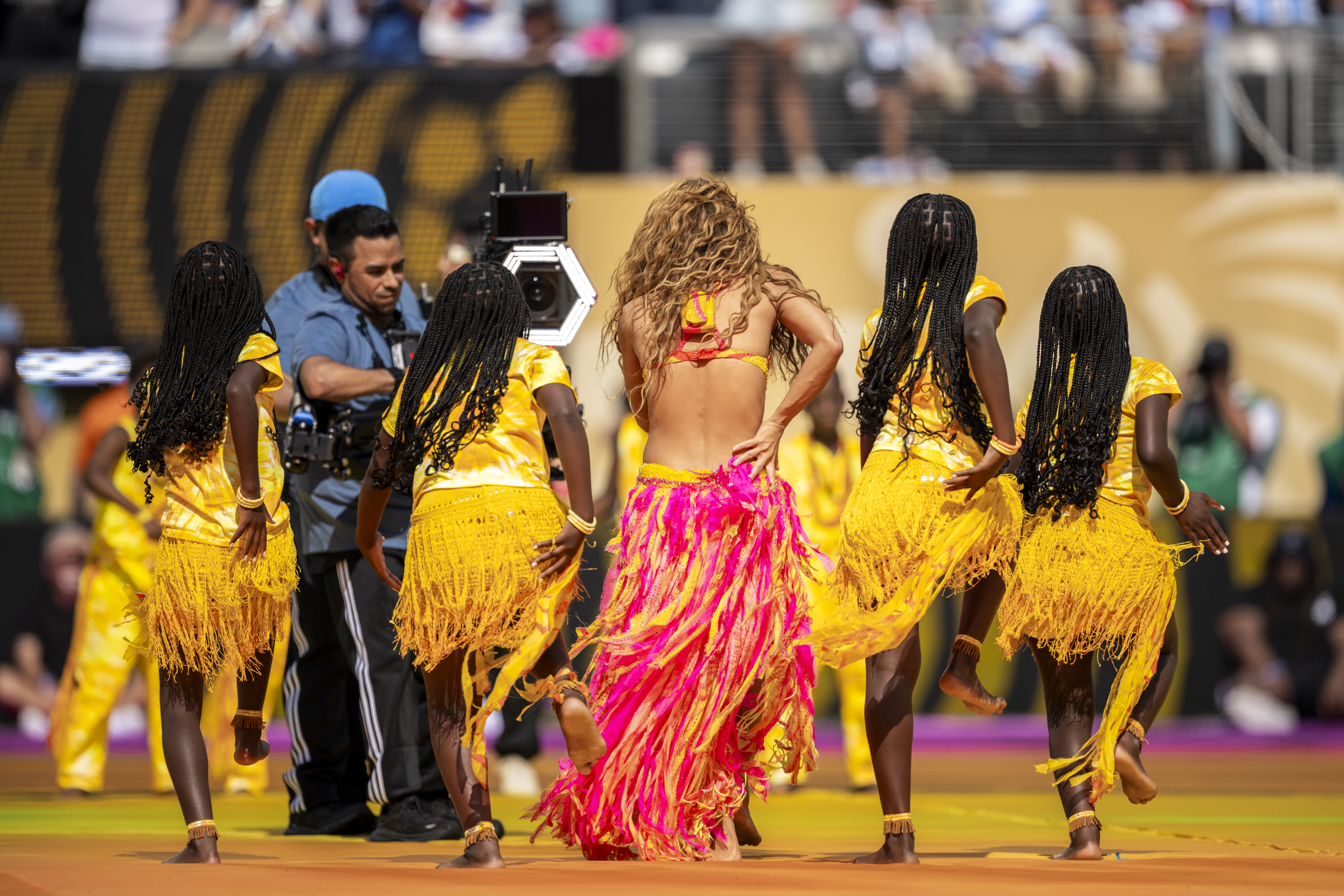
Shakira and the Ghetto Kids performing "Dai Dai" during the halftime show

The 2026 final was the first final in World Cup history to include a halftime show, similar to the halftime shows featured at the NFL Super Bowl. It was co-headlined by singer-songwriters Madonna and Shakira, South Korean boy band BTS, and Justin Bieber, and featured guest performances from Burna Boy and Emmanuel Kelly. Jason Sudeikis and Brendan Hunt appeared as the characters Ted Lasso and Coach Beard, respectively, from the television series Ted Lasso. Other performers included the rock group Electric Mayhem from The Muppets, the Ghetto Kids, the PS22 Chorus, and a combined New York Philharmonic and Simón Bolívar Symphony Orchestra, with Bijan Mortazavi and conducted by Gustavo Dudamel. The show was part of an effort to reach $100 million for the FIFA Global Citizen Education Fund, which seeks to increase access to education and sports for children.

The halftime show was criticized by some commentators and fans as being too commercialized and an unwanted Americanization of the match. The halftime break lasted 27 minutes and 22 seconds, which broke the IFAB Laws of the Game which state that the halftime break cannot exceed 15 minutes. (Note: Attributed to multiple references:)

== See also ==
- Argentina at the FIFA World Cup
- Spain at the FIFA World Cup
- 1994 FIFA World Cup final – another World Cup final played in the United States
