= Rewind (2022 film) =

2022 film by Matthias Temmermans

- Directed by: Matthias Temmermans
- Written by: Tyche Beyens; Tom Vermeyen
- Produced by: Rutger Beckers; Kris Gaens
- Starring: Céline Dept; Michiel Callebaut; Jean-Romy Manzila; Anaïs Jansen; Louis Thyssen; Imea Denooze; Ayco Weets
- Cinematography: Steven Elisabeth
- Edited by: Frank Van Looy
- Production company: Sputnik Media
- Distributed by: Kinepolis Film Distribution; Streamz
- Release date: 26 October 2022
- Running time: 78 minutes
- Country: Belgium
- Language: Dutch

Rewind is a 2022 Belgian-Flemish comedy adventure film directed by Matthias Temmermans and starring Céline Dept and Michiel Callebaut of the social media duo Celine & Michiel, alongside Jean-Romy Manzila, Anaïs Jansen, Louis Thyssen, Imea Denooze and Ayco Weets.

It had its premiere at Kinepolis Antwerpen on 23 October 2022 and was released in Belgian cinemas on 26 October 2022.

== Plot ==
YouTube stars Céline and Michiel come up with various challenges. While recording a new video, Céline is sent back in time to 1996 due to a technical fault in a VR headset. She must struggle to return to the present.

== Cast ==
- Céline Dept as a fictional version of herself
- Michiel Callebaut as a fictional version of himself
- Jean-Romy Manzila as Carlos
- Anaïs Jansen as Sporty-J (Joyce in 1996)
  - Kyoko Scholiers as Joyce (Sporty-J in 2022)
- Louis Thyssen as Paul Peeters in 1996
  - Peter Thyssen as Paul Peeters in 2022
- Imea Denooze as Zahra
- Ayco Weets as Laiko
- Ruben Degroote as Adam in 1996
  - Xavier Baeyens as Adam in 2022 (uncredited)
- Michiel Donies as Magnus (uncredited)
- Pat Krimson as himself
- Loredana De Amicis as herself

== Reception ==
=== Critical response ===
Rewind received mixed reviews from critics.
