= World Cup (song) =

Single by IShowSpeed
- Released: November 4, 2022
- Recorded: September 21, 2022
- Studio: Metropolis Group
- Genre: Hip hop: dance-pop; afrobeats
- Length: 4:16
- Label: Warner Records
- Songwriters: Darren Watkins Jr.; Ryan Wage
- Producers: IShowSpeed; WageeBeats; Joe Grasso

IShowSpeed singles chronology
"Ronaldo (Sewey)" (2022)	"World Cup" (2022)	"Dogs" (2023)

Music video
- "World Cup" on YouTube

Audio sample
- A snippet of IShowSpeed - "World Cup": file; help

"World Cup" is a song by American influencer and online streamer IShowSpeed. It was released on November 4, 2022, through Warner Records, in honor of the 2022 FIFA World Cup. The song gained viral attention with the music video on YouTube gaining over 230 million views as of July 2026, and charting in multiple countries. The song was certified gold by the Recording Industry Association of America (RIAA) in June 2026.

== Background ==
IShowSpeed began watching football after a fan donated to Speed asking who his favorite football player was, to which he replied, "Christo [sic] Ronaldo, sewey!" Speed started playing FIFA during his livestream and slowly became his main persona which led to him being invited to the Sidemen 2022 Charity Match. Speed released "Ronaldo (Sewey)" prior to the 2022 FIFA World Cup as a meme song using Ronaldo's famous "Siuuu" phrase. Speed released "World Cup" on November 4 in honor of the same tournament.

== Legacy and sequel ==
In June 2026, before the 2026 FIFA World Cup, Speed released a follow-up song called "World Cup (Champions)"; it would later be included in the FIFA World Cup 2026 Official Album. That same month, "World Cup" would officially be certified gold in the United States.

== Credits and personnel ==
Credits adapted from Tidal.

- Darren Watkins Jr. – production, songwriting, vocals
- WageeBeats – production, songwriting
- Joe Grasso – production

== Charts ==
Chart performance for "World Cup"
Chart (2022–2023)	Peak position
Iceland (Tónlistinn)	34
Ireland (IRMA)	37
Netherlands (Single Tip)	1
New Zealand Hot Singles (RMNZ)	29
Sweden Heatseeker (Sverigetopplistan)	6
UK Hip Hop/R&B (Official Charts)	23
UK Singles (Official Charts)	52

== Certifications ==
Certifications and sales for "World Cup"
Region	Certification	Certified units/sales
Poland (ZPAV)	Gold	25,000^{‡}
United States (RIAA)	Gold	500,000^{‡}
^{‡} Sales+streaming figures based on certification alone.

== Release history ==
Release formats for "World Cup"
Region	Date	Format	Label	Ref.
Various	November 4, 2022	Digital download; streaming	Warner	

== See also ==
- List of FIFA World Cup songs and anthems
