= World Cup (Champions) =

Single by IShowSpeed

from the album Official FIFA World Cup 2026 Album
- Language: English; Spanish
- Released: June 1, 2026
- Genre: Pop rap; dance-pop; EDM; latin pop; football chant; samba
- Length: 4:58 (music video); 4:15 (streaming)
- Label: Warner (Note: under exclusive license from IShowSpeed, LLC.); SALXCO
- Songwriters: Darren Watkins Jr.; Doobie Newton; RiotUSA; Pink Slip; Vibarco; Olivier Francois; shonci
- Producers: Bongo ByTheWay; Pink Slip; RIOTUSA; Shonci

IShowSpeed singles chronology
"I Know" (2025)	"World Cup (Champions)" (2026)

2026 FIFA World Cup singles chronology
"Game Time" (2026)	"World Cup (Champions)" (2026)	"Siir Siir" (2026)

Music video
- "World Cup (Champions)" on YouTube

"World Cup (Champions)" (Note: Also alternately titled as "Champion", "Champions", or "Champions (WC 26)" on the streaming release.) is a song by American influencer, musician, and online streamer IShowSpeed, released on June 1, 2026 through Warner Records, and SALXCO. The song was released in anticipation of the 2026 FIFA World Cup as an unofficial anthem but was later included on the tournament's official album as one of its official singles. It was produced by BongoByTheWay, Pink Slip, and RiotUSA and written by Darren Watkins Jr. alongside Doobie Newton, Ephrem Louis Lopez Jr., Kyle Buckley, Olivier Francois, Shawn Shea and Vicente Jimenez Gomez del Barco.

The music video, directed by Zach Madden, was filmed in Miami and features stadium-inspired settings with national flags and colored powder effects.

The song received positive reviews from contemporary critics. It became IShowSpeed's third song to chart on the Official Charts Company's Video Streaming chart alongside "World Cup" and "Higher". IShowSpeed later performed the song at the closing ceremony of the 2026 FIFA World Cup final.

== Background and release ==
In November 2022, IShowSpeed released the song "World Cup" as a single through Warner Records in the leadup to the 2022 FIFA World Cup held in Qatar. "World Cup" gained viral attention, appearing on charts in Iceland, the United Kingdom, Ireland, Sweden, the Netherlands, and New Zealand.

In early 2026, speculation emerged that IShowSpeed was preparing a new football-themed song in connection with the 2026 FIFA World Cup. Reports followed the circulation of behind-the-scenes footage showing him filming a large-scale production in Miami. Images and videos from the shoot showed stadium-inspired settings, national flags, football jerseys, and production equipment, including camera crews and drones.

In May 2026, while conducting a travel livestream series throughout the Caribbean, he revealed that the World Cup would be his next focus, with plans for a North American tour to follow the tournament's matches. "World Cup (Champions)" was released on June 1, 2026 ahead of the 2026 FIFA World Cup.

== Composition ==
The song's chorus is built around a crowd chant of "Oh, ayy-oh, ayy-oh, ayy-oh / Let's go, we the champions". The song also features a refrain: "Put your flags up in the air / Put your hands up in the air / Put your flags up 'cause this is the World Cup / Put your flags up, leave 'em there." The chord progression in the song is E♯ minor, G♯, Bm, D♯. (Note: "World Cup (Champions)" Chords alt progression.)

== Music video ==
The accompanying music video was directed by Zach Madden, with cinematography by Joanna Nguyen and creative direction provided by Barely Manic and Wyatt Richards. The video was executive produced by Slipz and Ames J. Ward. The video production draws influence from Ghanaian culture, including appearances by traditional dancers and choreographed performance that attracted attention from audiences in multiple countries.

The music video was filmed in Miami and features Watkins in stadiums with national flags and colored powder effects. Throughout the video, he is seen wearing a Cristiano Ronaldo Portugal national team jersey. The music video received 3.3 million views on YouTube within less than 24 hours of its release and had received over 8.3 million views by June 3, 2026, two days after its release. As of July 28th, 2026, the music video has received over 105 million views on YouTube.

== Reception ==
Writing for LOS40, Sergio P. Naranjo described the song as a straightforward yet effective football anthem, highlighting that its chorus and upbeat rhythm helped it resonate with younger audiences. Independent Online noted that unlike the usual highly polished, pop-star tournament anthems, IShowSpeed delivered a track that felt like it was truly made by a football fan, for football fans.

Billboard included "Champions" in its curated list of the best 2026 FIFA World Cup songs, describing the track as driven by hard-hitting drums, passionate crowd chants, and an energetic rhythm blending elements of EDM, Brazilian funk, and Mariachi.

Writing for The Guardian about the live music of the 2026 FIFA World Cup final, Alexis Petridis criticized the song's production, writing and iShowSpeed's obscurity, describing the artist as an "influencer-cum-professional wrestler" whose online celebrity did not translate to mainstream recognition, and the song itself as "a frightful cocktail of thunderous drums and autotuned vocals [featuring] lyrics that make your average football song sound as erudite and profound as the oeuvre of Leonard Cohen". The live performance was criticized on social media, with many people thinking that he had not sung his vocals live, but had lip-synced to pre-recorded songs.

=== Fan debate and divided reception ===
The song generated division online, with football fans and digital commentators drawing comparisons between "World Cup (Champions)" and the official FIFA soundtrack single "Goals," performed by Lisa, Anitta, and Rema. Supporters of "World Cup (Champions)" argued that the track possessed a more organic quality than the official anthem. Fans also started online petitions requesting that FIFA formally adopt the song as the primary anthem of the tournament, comparing its energy to official tournament tracks by artists such as Shakira. However, some listeners defended Shakira, arguing that her song had more substance than IShowSpeed's track, and some maintained that her legacy as a World Cup performer remained unmatched.

NewsX published a fact-check examining claims that "World Cup (Champions)" had overtaken the official FIFA soundtrack single "Dai Dai". It found that the figures being circulated for the two songs' views were unverified. The report also noted that “Dai Dai” had an advantage on audio-streaming platforms, including the Billboard Global 200.

=== FIFA response ===
Following the song's release, IShowSpeed publicly tagged FIFA on social media, asking them to consider "World Cup (Champions)" as the tournament's official anthem. FIFA responded directly with the message: "We will be in touch". The reply went viral and generated widespread speculation about the possibility of a formal partnership.

On June 3, 2026, the song was officially added to the tracklist for the FIFA World Cup 2026 Official Album. Following its viral reception, FIFA reached out to Speed via social media to confirm its inclusion, saying "We heard it. We liked it. It's on the Official FIFA World Cup 2026 Album".

=== Commercial performance ===
Following the song's release, "World Cup (Champions)" debuted at number 8 on the United Kingdom's Video Streaming chart, becoming IShowSpeed's third song to chart on the Video Streaming chart alongside "World Cup" and "Higher", and jumped to number 3 the following week. The song also charted on the New Zealand Hot Singles chart at number 33, the Dutch Single Tip chart, and the Billboard Vietnam Hot 100. Following the performance of the song at the final, the song saw a 61% increase in streams.

== Live performances ==
IShowSpeed performed "World Cup (Champions)" live during the closing ceremony of the 2026 FIFA World Cup final between Spain and Argentina, held on July 19, 2026, at New York New Jersey Stadium. He was accompanied on stage by a troupe of drummers and dancers dressed in brightly coloured tracksuits. According to Speed, the invitation to perform came directly from FIFA, and he has said that he initially assumed the call was a prank before realizing the offer was genuine.

== Credits and personnel ==
Credits are adapted from the FIFA World Cup 2026 Official Album liner notes.

- Darren Watkins Jr. – lead vocals, songwriting
- Doobie Newton – songwriter
- Ephrem Louis Lopez Jr. – songwriter
- Kyle Buckley – songwriter
- Olivier Francois – songwriter
- Shawn Shea – songwriter
- Vicente Jimenez Gomez del Barco – songwriter
- BongoByTheWay – producer
- Pink Slip – producer
- RiotUSA – producer
- Shonci – producer

== Charts ==
Chart performance for "World Cup (Champions)"
Chart (2026)	Peak position
Netherlands (Single Tip)	10
New Zealand Hot Singles (RMNZ)	33
UK Video Streaming (Official Charts)	3
Vietnam Hot 100 (Billboard Vietnam)	16

== Release history ==
Release history and formats for "World Cup (Champions)"
Region	Date	Format	Label
Various	June 1, 2026	Digital download, streaming	Warner Records; SALXCO

== See also ==
- List of FIFA World Cup songs and anthems
