= Bastian Dankert =

German football referee

- Dankert after the 2025 Club World Cup final
- Born: 9 June 1980 (age 46); Schwerin, East Germany
- Other occupation: Sports scientist

Domestic
Years	League	Role
2008–	DFB	Referee
2011–	2. Bundesliga	Referee
2012–	Bundesliga	Referee

International
Years	League	Role
2014–	FIFA listed	Referee

Bastian Dankert (born 9 June 1980) is a German football referee who is based in Rostock. He referees for Brüsewitzer SV of the Mecklenburg-Vorpommern State Football Association. He is a FIFA referee, and is ranked as a UEFA second category referee. He was the VAR for the 2026 World Cup Final.

== Refereeing career ==
Dankert became a DFB referee in 2008, a Bundesliga referee in 2012, and a FIFA referee in 2014.

=== As VAR ===
On 30 April 2018, Dankert was selected by FIFA as one of the video assistant referees for the 2018 FIFA World Cup in Russia, the first FIFA World Cup to use the technology.

In 2019, he served as a video assistant referee at the 2019 Women's World Cup in France.

As VAR he has officiated finals in all three European club competitions: the 2022 Europa Conference League, the 2023 and 2025 Europa League, and the 2026 Champions League. Dankert also officiated four matches at the 2025 FIFA Club World Cup as VAR, including the final between Chelsea FC and Paris Saint-Germain.

Dankert served as a video assistant referee at the 2018 World Cup, Euro 2021, the 2022 World Cup, and Euro 2024. For the 2026 World Cup, he was assigned to the final, among other matches.

Dankert is known for being the VAR that made the controversial VAR intervention requesting the field referee to overturn their call and review for an England penalty between The Netherlands and England in the UEFA Euro 2024 semi-final.

== Personal life ==
Dankert lives in Rostock and is a sports scientist. In his main profession he is the general manager and marketing director at the Mecklenburg-Vorpommern State Football Association.
