= Department =

Department may refer to:

- Departmentalization, division of a larger organization into parts with specific responsibility

== Government and military ==
- Department (administrative division), a geographical and administrative division within a country, for example:
  - Departments of Argentina, the second level of administrative division in Argentina, below the provinces
  - Departments of Chile
  - Departments of Colombia, a grouping of municipalities
  - Departments of France, administrative divisions three levels below the national government
  - Departments of Honduras
  - Departments of Peru, name given to the subdivisions of Peru until 2002
  - Departments of Uruguay
- Department (United States Army), corps areas of the U.S. Army prior to World War I
- Fire department, a public or private organization that provides emergency firefighting and rescue services
- Ministry (government department), a specialized division of a government
- Police department, a body empowered by the state to enforce the law
- Department (naval) administrative/functional sub-unit of a ship's company.

== Other uses ==
- Department (film), a 2012 Bollywood action film about police taking on Mumbai criminals
- The Department (film), a 2015 Nigerian action film, about two lovers undermining dodgy business dealings
- The Department, a satirical comedy on BBC Radio 4
- The Department (play), a 1975 play by David Williamson
  - The Department, a 1980 TV film based on the play
- The Department (book), a 2024 non fiction book by John Pring about the impact the UK's social security system has had on disabled people
- Academic department, a division of a university or school faculty devoted to a particular academic discipline
- Department head, a management position
- Department store, a retail store that includes many specialized departments such as clothing or household items

== See also ==
- Ministry
- Departments of the United Kingdom Government
- United States federal executive departments
- List of Australian Commonwealth Government entities
- Structure of the Canadian federal government
- Federal administration of Switzerland
