= The Department (book) =

2024 book by John Pring

- Author: John Pring (journalist)
- Genre: Non fiction
- Publisher: Pluto Press
- Publication date: August 2024
- ISBN: 978-0-7453-4989-3

The Department: How a Violent Government Bureaucracy Killed Hundreds and Hid the Evidence is a book that delves into the United Kingdom's Department for Work and Pensions and the impact its social security system has had on disabled claimants. It was written by John Pring and was published in 2024 by Pluto Press.

== About ==
The Department covers evidence that Pring unearthed that connects the British social security system to the deaths of disabled claimants. Pring traces the history of the Department of Social Security and that of its successor, the Department for Work and Pensions (DWP). The DWP currently manages social security in the UK and the book looks at how John Major, Tony Blair, and the Coalition Government 2010-2015 each handled the department. The impact of these reforms is discussed, as is their connection to disabled people's deaths following interactions with the DWP system. Individual deaths are explored in detail, with chapters covering the deaths of Stephen Carré, David Clapson, Michael O’Sullivan, Philippa Day, and Errol Graham.

== Reception ==
The book was positively reviewed, with The Sociological Review Foundation calling it a "haunting account" of how the DWP has knowingly harmed disabled claimants. Many reviewers cautioned readers about the upsetting nature of the suicides covered in the book, but praised Pring's complex coverage of the deaths, due to his care not attributing any one cause to them.

In 2024 a crowdfunding campaign was launched by disabled activists to help them deliver copies of the The Department to incoming 2024 Labour government. The crowdfunded campaign initially aimed to send over 400 copies, one for each Labour MP, but when they met their goal of £3,500 the campaign was expanded to £7,000. This goal was also met, leading to all 640 MPs in House of Commons receiving a copy in September 2024.
