= Céline Dept =

Belgian influencer (born 1999)

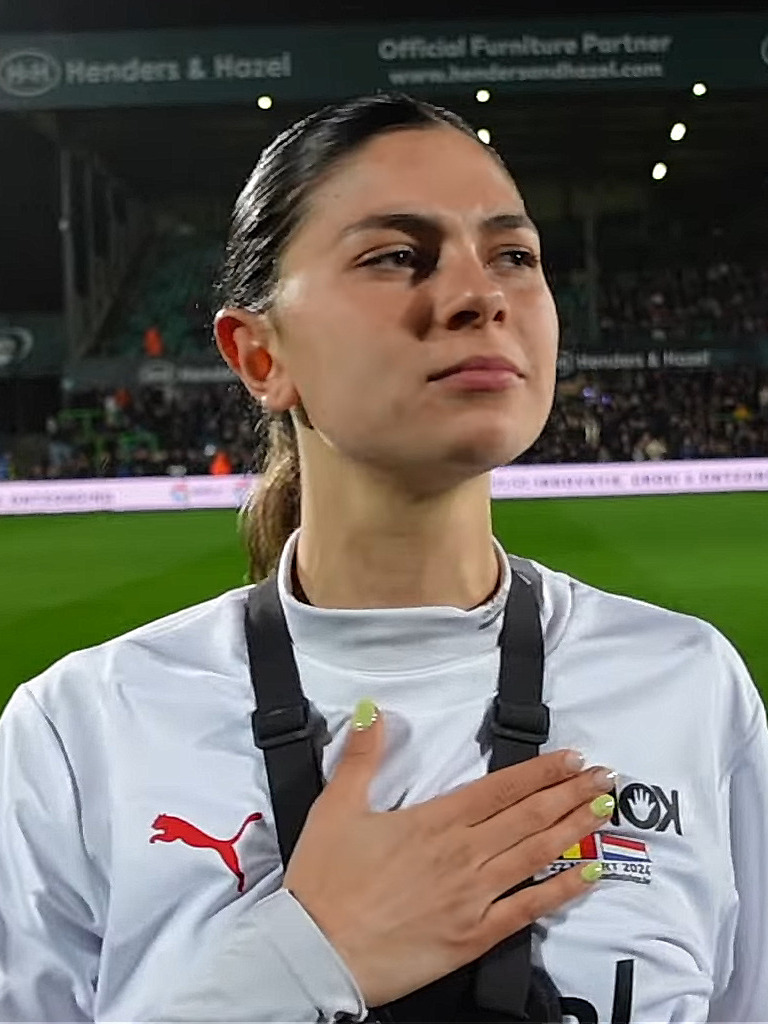
- Dept in 2024
- Born: 8 December 1999 (age 26); Ostend, West Flanders, Belgium

Instagram information
- Page: celine.dept
- Years active: 2013—present
- Followers: 9.4 million

TikTok information
- Page: celinedept
- Years active: 2019–present
- Followers: 22.2 million

YouTube information
- Channels: CelineDept; CEMI
- Years active: 2019–present
- Subscribers: 68 million @CelineDept; 13.6 million @CEMI
- Views: 67 billion @CelineDept; 12.9 billion @CEMI
- Last updated: 2 November 2026
- Website: cemishop.com

Céline Dept (Flemish pronunciation: [seːˈlin(ə) ˈdɛpt]; born 8 December 1999) is a Belgian influencer, best known for primarily uploading football-related content on her TikTok and YouTube channels, and being the first Belgian to reach 10 million subscribers on YouTube. Dept began uploading videos to TikTok in April 2019, and by January 2020, had the highest number of TikTok followers of any Belgian influencer, with around 2.7 million followers. She appeared in a feature-length movie in 2022. She is also known for her content related to dance, lip syncs, and pranks, and has been sponsored by various brands and started her own clothing line in 2022.

== Early life ==
Céline Dept was born on 8 December 1999 to a Belgian father and a French-Tunisian mother, and comes from Ostend, West Flanders. Prior to her career as an influencer, she was a football player for Cercle Brugge K.S.V., among other teams.

== Online career ==
Dept began uploading videos to TikTok in April 2019. She stated that she was inspired to make commenting, "At first, it was all for fun, but suddenly it went super fast and I was busy with it full time." Her videos mainly consist of dances, lip syncs, football, and pranks. Her account received sponsorships from various brands, such as a free car from a Mercedes-Benz dealership. In 2019, she also started the YouTube channel (CEMI).

By January 2020, she had over 2.7 million followers on TikTok, becoming the most-followed account in Belgium. A month later, her first meet-and-greet took place near Mechelen at the science museum Technopolis, which gained media attention as nearby highway traffic became congested due to the presence of hundreds of fans.

In January 2021, the animal rights organization GAIA criticized Dept and Callebaut after they released a video in which they purchased a Chow Chow, which the organization stated was acquired from a puppy mill. Dept subsequently apologized for this and said that she was unaware she was supporting such practices.

Video clip of Dept hugging several Dutch influencers during the "YouTube-interland".

In 2022, she released a clothing line under the CEMI name. On 26 October 2022, she debuted as the lead actress alongside Callebaut in their first feature-length film Rewind, which was released in Belgian cinemas and the Flemish streaming service Streamz. She started a personal YouTube channel in May 2023. Three months later, she became the first Belgian to reach 10 million subscribers on the platform. Her channel has featured famous footballers such as Gareth Bale, Neymar, Eden Hazard, Kylian Mbappé, Rayan Cherki and Erling Haaland. Dept were together interviewed in media journalist Jonas Lips' 2023 book Tiktok Academy, where they provided their advice on creating trending content for social media.

In March 2024, the pair led the football team "Creators FC", which consisted of Belgian influencers, in what was known as the first "YouTube-interland" against a team of Dutch influencers, with proceeds from the match funding a charity for children with cancer. She later appeared in a livestream of American influencer IShowSpeed on 28 June 2024, in which she accompanied him while he toured Brussels.

== Personal life ==
Dept has been in a relationship with Michiel Callebaut since 2018, with whom she co-founded and runs the social media channel CEMI.

== Awards ==
Year	Award	Category	Result	Refs.
2020	The Gala of the Golden K's	Cool girl of the year	Nominated	
2020	The Gala of the Golden K's	TikTok star of the year	Nominated	
2020	The Jamies	Best TikTok	Nominated	
2021	2021 Kids' Choice Awards	Favorite Star (Belgium)	Nominated	

== Filmography ==
Year	Title	Role	Refs.
2022	Rewind	Herself	

== Written works ==
- Dept, Céline; Callebaut, Michiel (8 December 2022). CEMI - CEMI Doeboek [CEMI - CEMI activity book] (in Dutch). Horizon. ISBN 9789464103526.
- Dept, Céline; Callebaut, Michiel (4 April 2023). CEMI - CEMI Doeboek 2 [CEMI - CEMI activity book 2] (in Dutch). Horizon. ISBN 9789464103519.
- Dept, Céline; Callebaut, Michiel (5 October 2023). CEMI - Céline vs. Michiel (in Dutch). Horizon. ISBN 9789464100020.
- Dept, Céline; Callebaut, Michiel (18 April 2024). Friends forever – CEMI vriendschapsboekje [Friends forever – CEMI friendship booklet] (in Dutch). Horizon. ISBN 9789464104448.

== See also ==
- List of most-subscribed YouTube channels
- List of most-viewed YouTube channels
