= IShowSpeed =

American influencer and streamer (born 2005)

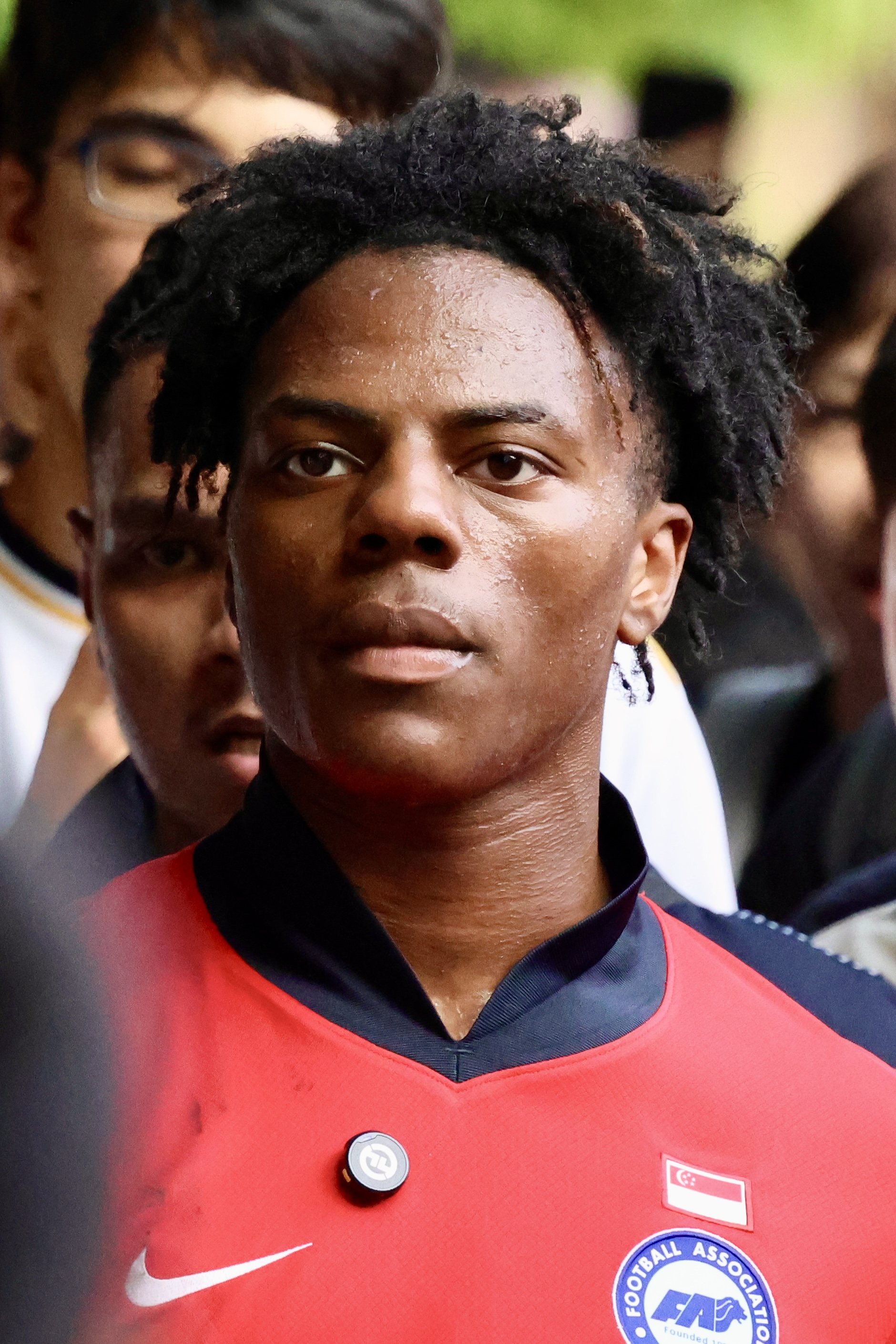
- Watkins in 2024
- Born: Darren Jason Watkins Jr. January 21, 2005 (age 21); Cincinnati, Ohio, U.S.
- Other names: Speed; John Bobby; Jiakang Ge (甲亢哥); Barima Kofi Akuffo; Speed Maximus
- Citizenship: United States; Ghana
- Education: Cincinnati College Preparatory Academy; Purcell Marian High School
- Occupations: YouTuber; online streamer; rapper
- Years active: 2016–present

Instagram information
- Page: IShowSpeed
- Years active: 2014–present
- Followers: 55.5 million

TikTok information
- Page: IShowSpeed
- Years active: 2021–present
- Followers: 55.9 million

Twitch information
- Channel: IShowSpeed
- Years active: 2018–2021; 2023–present
- Genre: Gaming
- Followers: 6.7 million

X information
- Handle: @ishowspeedsui
- Display name: Speed
- Years active: 2018–present
- Topic: Stream clips
- Followers: 4.1 million

YouTube information
- Channel: IShowSpeed
- Genres: Gaming; Let's Play; IRL; travelling; soccer
- Subscribers: 63.2 million
- Views: 11.6 billion
- Musical career
- Genres: Comedy hip-hop; trap; pop rap
- Label: Warner
- Professional wrestling career
- Billed height: 5 ft 8 in (173 cm)
- Billed from: Cincinnati, Ohio, U.S.
- Trained by: Fit Finlay; Johnny Moss; Lince Dorado; Matt Bloom; Randy Orton; Robbie Brookside; Sheamus; Logan Paul; WWE Performance Center
- Debut: February 1, 2025
- Last updated: November 22, 2026
- Website: speed.store

Darren Jason Watkins Jr. (born January 21, 2005), better known as IShowSpeed or simply Speed, is an American influencer, entrepreneur, and online streamer. Known for his dramatic and energetic behavior he displays during his variety of live streams and in-real-life streams, he is regarded as one of the most popular entertainers and internet personalities in the world.

Watkins was born in Cincinnati, Ohio. Registering his YouTube channel in 2016, he first posted gaming content. Watkins started gaining attention in 2021 due to his violent verbal and physical reactions when gaming. In 2022, he began shifting focus towards general entertainment, including soccer-related content, becoming an avid supporter of Cristiano Ronaldo, commonly revolving his content around his support for the player.

In 2024, Watkins began to tour the world by livestreaming in various worldwide locations. Many of these streams gained significant live viewership and resulted in international news coverage, leading some to praise him and view him as a cultural ambassador as he showed a more authentic side of countries, such as their cultures and inventions, to both domestic and international audiences.

Watkins has also pursued a rapping career. He signed with Warner Records to release his 2022 single "World Cup", which charted in several countries. He followed it up with the 2026 single "Champions", which was featured on the FIFA World Cup 2026 Official Album and performed it at the tournament's closing ceremony. He was named Breakout Streamer of the Year at the 12th Streamy Awards in 2022, and thrice won Streamer of the Year at the 2024, 2025, and 2026 Streamer Awards making history as the only streamer to win the award three times in a row.

== Early life ==
Darren Jason Watkins Jr. was born on January 21, 2005, in Cincinnati, Ohio. His father, Darren Watkins Sr., as well as two younger siblings, including a half-brother named Dian (also known as Jamal), also broadcast on YouTube. Through his paternal lineage, he is the great-grandson of Harold Watkins, who became the first African-American fire chief of the Detroit Fire Department in 1988. His mother, Tiffany Elizabeth Graves, was the primary caregiver for Watkins during his early years, following her divorce from his father when Watkins was young.

Watkins was raised in the Bond Hill neighborhood of Cincinnati. He attended Cincinnati College Preparatory Academy for elementary school and subsequently enrolled at Purcell Marian High School. During his childhood, Watkins got the nickname "Speedy" due to his athleticism and habit of running away from dogs. In 2020, during the COVID-19 pandemic, a video clip of Watkins reacting aggressively to a video game was reposted by the media outlet WorldStarHipHop; the resulting negative comments caused a conflict between Watkins and his mother. Consequently, Watkins moved to Detroit, Michigan, to live with his father. There, he shared a bedroom with his uncle and began livestreaming full-time using a setup which consisted of a PlayStation 4 and a webcam.

== Internet career ==
=== 2016–2021: Origins, early content, and platform bans ===
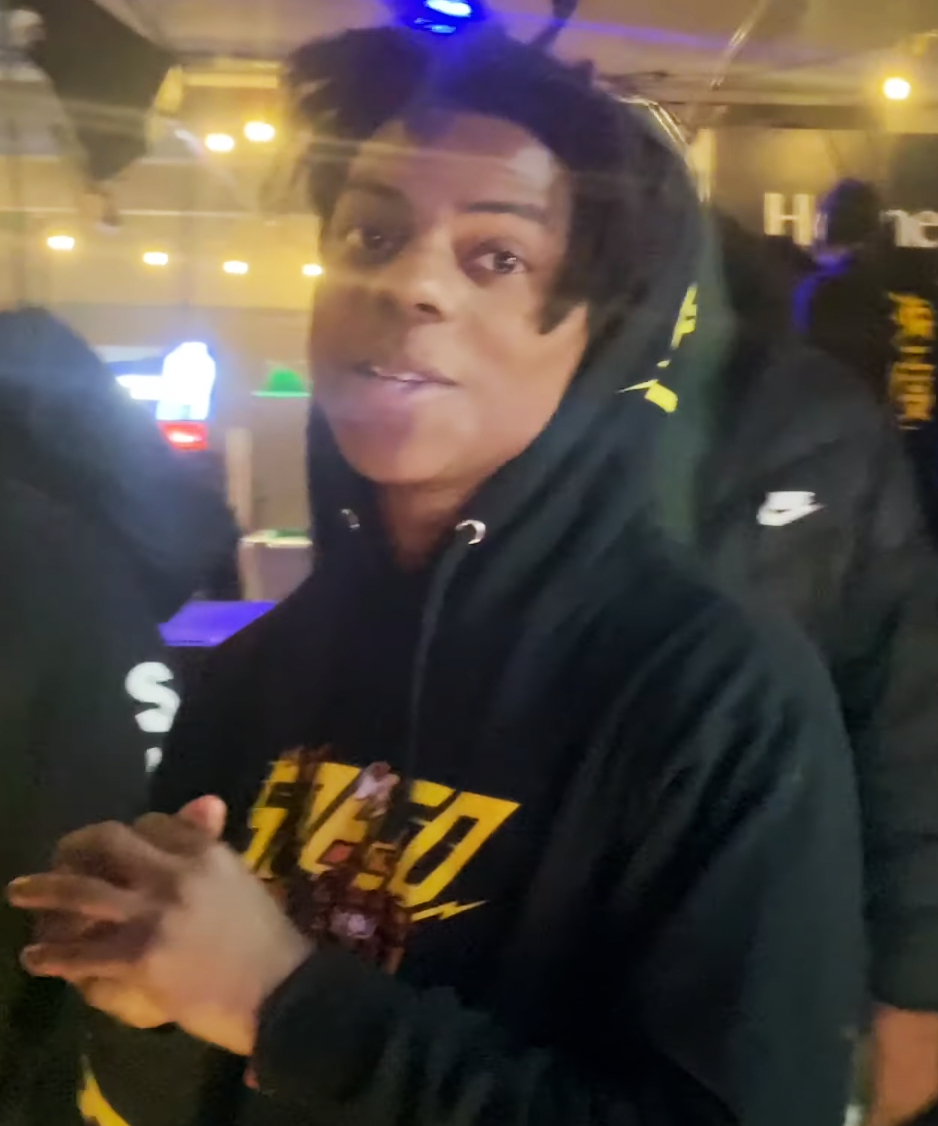
Watkins interacting with fans in 2021

Watkins first created his YouTube channel "IShowSpeed" in March 2016, though he initially uploaded gameplay clips only occasionally. He began consistent livestreaming in December 2017, primarily broadcasting games such as NBA 2K and Fortnite. His early streams initially had low viewership on average; by 2020, he averaged approximately ten concurrent viewers per broadcast.

His viewership increased significantly in 2021, while his channel grew from 100,000 subscribers in April 2021 to 1 million subscribers in June 2021. This growth was largely due to clips of his energetic behavior during livestreams, which were often characterized by aggressive outbursts directed at games, players, and his camera, being posted onto various social media platforms including TikTok, all of which became viral internet memes. Kotaku described Watkins as "one of the biggest and fastest-rising streamers" on YouTube during this period.

Watkins's conduct resulted in bans from multiple platforms. In December 2021, he participated in a Twitch "e-dating" livestream hosted by Adin Ross. During the broadcast, Watkins made comments to participant Ash Kash that Twitch moderation interpreted as a threat of sexual violence. Ross disconnected Watkins from the call; however, Watkins rejoined and directed further aggressive remarks at Kash. Twitch subsequently banned Watkins from the platform for "sexual coercion or intimidation". The platform reinstated his account nearly two years later, on October 10, 2023.

On December 29, 2021, during a four-hour-and-23-minute livestream titled "EARLY STREAM!", Watkins participated in a Fortnite match that spawned a viral internet meme. During the game, a teammate with the username "Acey Daddy" requested that Watkins help him win, stating, "Please, Speed, I need this! My mom is kind of homeless." Watkins puckered his lips, visibly suppressing laughter, while a third player, "Pew is daddy", scolded him for his reaction. The clip became viral on many social media platforms, including on TikTok and X. Many other clips throughout the live stream would end up receiving similar internet meme statuses over the next several years. The stream itself later attained a 10/10 rating on IMDb, briefly surpassing the Breaking Bad episode "Ozymandias" in user ratings.

On October 26, 2025, nearly four years after the viral livestream, Watkins organized a reunion with the two players. During the stream, "Acey Daddy" confirmed that his mother's housing situation had improved. The player's mother later appeared on the livestream and scolded Watkins for laughing at her situation in 2021.

=== 2022–2023: Initial popularity ===
In April 2022, a clip of Watkins playing Valorant on a live stream surfaced online. In the video, he tells a female player: "Get off the fucking game and do your husband's dishes." This resulted in one of the game's producers, Sara Dadafshar, permanently banning Watkins from Valorant and all other Riot Games titles. YouTube's global head of gaming creators, Lester Chen, replied to the clip, stating he was "on it." Watkins subsequently apologized for his behavior, acknowledging that it was "wrong", and claimed that he had received racist comments from other players that day.

On July 4, 2022, during Independence Day, Watkins set off a Pikachu firework inside his bedroom, which filled the room with sparks and smoke, resulting in a response from the fire department. He reached 10 million subscribers on YouTube later that month. In late July 2022, Watkins received a community guidelines strike and a one-week ban on YouTube after livestreaming a sexual Minecraft mod named "Jenny's Mod" to 96,000 live viewers. The broadcast displayed explicit sexual activity involving his in-game character. Watkins initially censored the screen but later accidentally revealed the content.

On August 8, 2022, Watkins was swatted while livestreaming on YouTube. Officers handcuffed him, and his cameraman was forced to end the broadcast. He later claimed that he had been jailed and that Adin Ross had posted his bail, allowing him to return to streaming on August 11. In September 2022, Watkins participated in the Sidemen Charity Match. During the match, he became frustrated at referee Mark Clattenburg for disallowing a goal due to offside; Watkins whipped Clattenburg with the jersey he had removed during his celebration, receiving a yellow card.

In November 2022, Sky Sports announced that they would cease featuring Watkins on their platforms after past misogynistic and derogatory comments resurfaced. The broadcaster removed all content featuring him from their social media channels and website. On November 16, Watkins faced criticism for allegedly promoting a cryptocurrency scam known as a "pump and dump scheme" during a livestream for The Paradox Metaverse, an open-world game. The following day, he apologized, stating: "I made a mistake that I wish I never did but I'm not a scammer."

In December 2022, Watkins won the "Breakout Streamer" award at the 12th Streamy Awards. That same month, during the 2022 FIFA World Cup, he generated controversy for his behavior toward a Chinese spectator in Qatar. During a livestream, he approached a man wearing an Argentina jersey; when the man indicated he did not speak English, Watkins repeatedly said "Konnichiwa" and uttered sounds reminiscent of Cantonese and Mandarin Chinese. Following backlash, he uploaded an apology video to Twitter.

Watkins expanded his platform in May 2023 by announcing an exclusive streaming deal with the platform Rumble in collaboration with Kai Cenat. On June 17, 2023, he met Portuguese footballer Cristiano Ronaldo in Lisbon following Portugal's match against Bosnia and Herzegovina.

By August 2023, Watkins surpassed 20 million subscribers on YouTube. On August 16, he accidentally exposed his private part to a live audience of 25,000 viewers while playing Five Nights at Freddy's: Security Breach after being startled by a jump scare. The incident became a trending topic on social media platforms, leading to some people calling him "IShowMeat". YouTube did not ban Watkins for the incident. In December 2023, Watkins participated in a charity boxing sparring session with KSI, raising funds for the Anthony Walker Foundation.

=== 2024–present: Travel content, streamer of the year and continued growth ===
Watkins walking through the streets of Chinatown, Singapore, during his Southeast Asia tour in September 2024

On February 23, 2024, Watkins participated in "Match for Hope 2024", a soccer charity match hosted in Ahmad bin Ali Stadium, Qatar, where he played for Team Chunkz. A clip of him went viral in which he slide tackled Brazilian former soccer player Kaká.

On May 29, 2024, Watkins attended the annual Cooper's Hill Cheese-Rolling and Wake in Gloucestershire, England, during which he suffered a leg injury, which he claimed required hospitalization. In June and July 2024, during the UEFA Euro 2024, Watkins toured Europe, reaching 25 million subscribers on June 2. On July 3, Watkins visited Norway, where he streamed in a souvenir store. While interacting with a large gathering of fans from a second story window, he injured his ankle. Upon being escorted out by a bodyguard, Watkins was attacked by the crowd, and would be hospitalized. Watkins's tour of Europe received over 2.5 billion views across multiple social media platforms.

On August 3, 2024, Watkins performed a live-streamed stunt, where he jumped over two speeding supercars in Miami, Florida. The stream was then deleted on August 5 due to violating YouTube's Terms of Service. While on tour in Southeast Asia, he surpassed 30 million subscribers and accumulated a total of 110 million views for the duration of the trip. One of Watkins's livestreams, titled "IRL Stream in Indonesia", marked the first time an English-speaking streamer had received one million concurrent viewers in a livestream.

In November 2024, Watkins lost an exhibition 50-meter race against 2024 Summer Olympics men's 100 meters gold medalist Noah Lyles. The competition was refereed and organized by MrBeast. On November 22, Watkins began his tour of Australia and New Zealand. On November 26, it was announced that Watkins would become the president of the U.S. version of Baller League, a six-a-side soccer league. Later that month, he was ranked first by Complex Networks in its list of "The 25 Best Streamers Right Now".

In December 2024, Watkins was nominated for and won the "Get Off Your A** Award (Best IRL Streamer)", "Best International Streamer", and "Streamer of the Year" awards at the 2024 Streamer Awards. Later that month, he won the "Most Influential Soccer Creator" award at the Goal Champions Awards.

On January 10, 2025, Watkins announced that he would be doing a tour in South America. On January 28, during his tour in Peru, he was declared an honorary mayor of Lima for an hour by Rafael López Aliaga, the city's mayor, who also declared him an "ambassador of Lima".

Later on February 14, 2025, Watkins participated in "Match for Hope 2025", a soccer charity event hosted in Stadium 974, Qatar, as a co-captain for Team Chunkz & IShowSpeed, facing off against team AboFlah & KSI. The match ended with team AboFlah & KSI's 6–5 victory over team Chunkz & IShowSpeed. The event raised more than $10.7 million for charity.

Watkins scored his first charity match goal in the Sidemen Charity Match at the Wembley Stadium in March 2025.

On March 5, 2025, Watkins was featured on CBS Sports Golazo's coverage of the UEFA Champions League. Later on March 8, 2025, Watkins participated in the 2025 Sidemen Charity Match, held at Wembley Stadium in London, United Kingdom. Serving as both captain and player for the YouTube Allstars team, he scored his first goal in the charity match series in the 56th minute, having failed to score in his previous two appearances. Watkins later secured victory for the YouTube Allstars by converting the decisive penalty in a shoot-out.

On March 18, 2025, Watkins announced that he would be doing a tour in mainland China and Mongolia. During his tour, Chinese state media and Chinese netizens praised Watkins for "promoting positive relations between China and the United States". In contrast to his streams in mainland China, Watkins's stream in Hong Kong was chaotic due to overcrowding and harassment by local fans; his ride on the MTR led to fans causing damage to Tin Hau station.

A map showing the countries IShowSpeed has visited on his livestreams United States Visited by IShowSpeed

On May 5, 2025, Watkins was swatted at a KFC store during a Cinco de Mayo livestream.

On July 5, 2025, Watkins announced a second tour to Europe, he also began streaming on Twitch for the first time in four years. On July 9, Watkins visited Serbia and met Baka Prase, who gave him a €30,000 Rolex as a gift. In Latvia, Watkins's behavior on the base of the Freedom Monument and the payment of €30,000 from the Investment and Development Agency of Latvia towards Watkins's travel expenses drew criticism from the Latvian public. Later on July 22, Watkins participated in the MLS All-Star Skills Challenge, participating alongside USMNT and Orlando City player Alex Freeman in the shooting and passing challenges, although his score was not counted towards the overall result. Watkins also presented Houston Dynamo 2 goalkeeper Pedro Cruz with the winner's belt after his victory in the Goalie Wars event.

On August 28, 2025, Watkins began the "Speed Does America" tour, a 35-day, 24/7 livestreaming trip across the United States, during which he streamed continuously on both YouTube and Twitch while visiting 25 states. That same month, Rolling Stone named him its "Most Influential Creator of 2025".

The tour concluded at the Los Angeles Memorial Coliseum, where Watkins hosted the premiere of his five-part YouTube series Speed Goes Pro. A number of celebrities attended the event, including Justin Bieber, Kim Kardashian, Suni Lee, DDG, and Randy Orton. Produced by OBB Pictures and sponsored by Dick's Sporting Goods, the series documents Watkins as he attempts to reach the skill level of professional athletes in various sports by training with professional athletes such as Tom Brady, Suni Lee, Nastia Liukin, Joey Chestnut, and Kevin Durant.

Two purchasable outfits based on Watkins's likeness were added to Fortnite Battle Royale on December 25, 2025.

On December 29, 2025, Watkins began the "Speed Does Africa" tour, where he livestreamed visiting 20 African countries in 28 days. During his tour of Egypt, Watkins became the first content creator to stream inside the Great Pyramid of Giza. While touring in Nigeria, he celebrated his 21st birthday on January 21, 2026, while his YouTube channel surpassed 50 million subscribers that same day becoming the first black creator to reach the milestone. After his visit to Ghana, he was granted a Ghanaian citizenship.

In February 2026, Doritos released a limited-edition snack in collaboration with Watkins as part of the brand's "Flavor Swap" initiative. The product featured the "Cheddar & Sour Cream" flavor of Ruffles on a traditional Doritos chip.

On March 21, 2026, Watkins played in the inaugural Fanatics Flag Football Classic in Los Angeles against current and former NFL players.

In April 2026, IShowSpeed announced that he is working with Brian Robbins' company Big Shot Pictures on an anime series which will feature an animated version of IShowSpeed, with the series being written by Matt Owens, who was previously the showrunner for the first two seasons of Netflix's critically acclaimed series One Piece.

On April 25, 2026, Watkins began his Caribbean Tour, where he livestreamed visiting 15 Caribbean countries. On April 29, 2026, during a livestream in the Dominican Republic, Watkins pledged to donate all earnings from the stream to support flood recovery efforts following severe flooding on the island. On May 7, 2026, Watkins arrived in Jamaica, where he was welcomed at the Norman Manley International Airport by Junkanoo dancers. Prior to reaching Jamaica, the tour included stops in Trinidad and Tobago, the Dominican Republic, Puerto Rico, and others.

In June 2026, Watkins started his "World Cup 2026 Tour", a series of livestreams which covered various locations across the 2026 FIFA World Cup. He has even partnered with FIFA, Fox Sports, and YouTube to host live simulcasts of select matches for U.S. viewers, which were broadcast via the Fox One YouTube channel. Additionally, Watkins became a playable character in FIFA Heroes and has appeared on the game's cover. On July 3, FIFA announced an investigation after allegations of racist abuse of him by an Argentinian supporter during round 32 of Argentina's 3–2 win over Cabo Verde. A later statement read, "FIFA strongly condemns racism, hate and discrimination in all forms."

On October 15, 2026, Watkins announced that he would serve as an executive producer on the documentary The Eyes of Ghana, alongside former U.S. President Barack Obama and First Lady Michelle Obama.

== Other ventures ==
=== Music career ===
In August 2021, Watkins released his first single, "Dooty Booty", on his YouTube channel. Following its upload, the song quickly became popular on YouTube and other social media sites, such as TikTok. In November, Watkins released a single titled "Shake", which sampled both "Ready or Not" by the Fugees and "Hit The Road Jack" by Ray Charles. The song's accompanying music video received over 211 million views on YouTube.

In June 2022, he released a song called "Ronaldo (Sewey)", following his newfound admiration for Cristiano Ronaldo. In November 2022, he released a single titled "World Cup" under Warner Records in honor of the 2022 FIFA World Cup. On July 7, 2023, Watkins was a surprise guest at the 2023 Rolling Loud festival in Portugal and performed "Shake", "World Cup" and "Portuginies" with the support of American rapper Ski Mask the Slump God and producer DJ Scheme.

In March 2024, Watkins released his first extended play, Trip 2 Brazil.

In June 2026, his song "World Cup (Champions)" was included in the FIFA World Cup 2026 Official Album. On July 19, 2026, Watkins performed the song at the closing ceremony of the 2026 FIFA World Cup final.

=== Professional wrestling ===
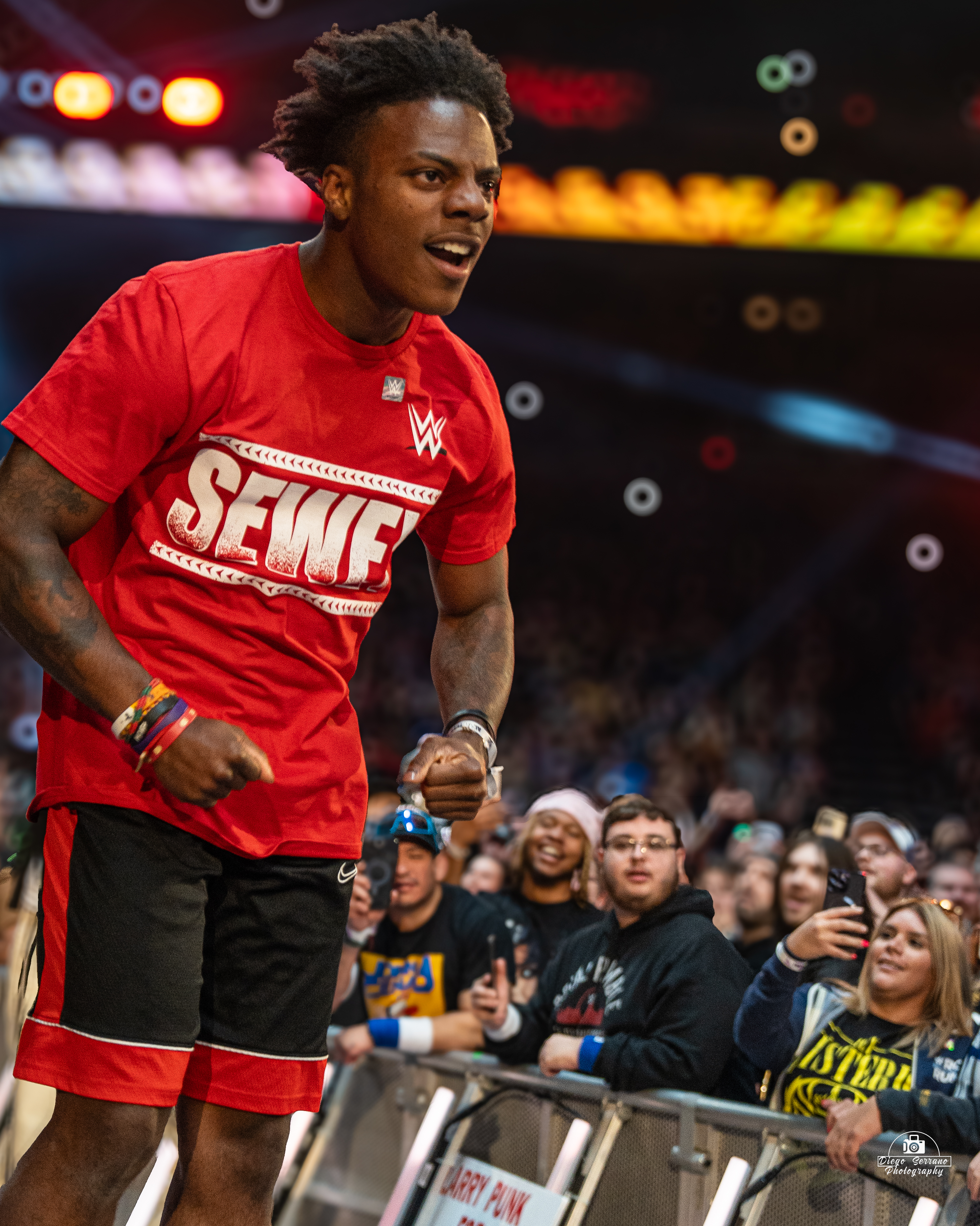
Watkins making his entrance at the 2025 men's Royal Rumble match

In April 2024, Watkins accompanied Logan Paul during his United States Championship defense on night 2 of WWE's event WrestleMania XL. Initially disguised as a Prime mascot, he unmasked at ringside during the match before Randy Orton put him through one of the broadcast tables with an RKO. Later that month, Watkins announced the second-round picks for the Raw brand during the 2024 WWE Draft on Monday Night Raw. He entered the 2025 men's Royal Rumble match, where he and Bron Breakker eliminated Otis, but was speared by Breakker and eliminated shortly after. In a November episode of his web series Speed Goes Pro, Watkins was documented training with various WWE wrestlers at the Performance Center.

In March and April 2026, he made several appearances on Raw, in which he became involved in an on-screen storyline in which he aligned with The Vision (Logan Paul and Austin Theory) against The Usos and LA Knight, which culminated into a six-man tag team match at WrestleMania 42, where his team ultimately lost. Following the match, Paul attacked Watkins, resulting in Watkins performing a top-rope splash onto Paul through a broadcast table with assistance from Knight and The Usos.

== Personal beliefs ==
=== Political ===
Watkins is a supporter of Palestine, has expressed opposition to Israel, and regularly shouts "Free Palestine!" on his livestreams. In June 2024, he donated $50,000 to the Palestine Children's Relief Fund.

=== Religious ===
Watkins has been raised in a Christian household and has often shown great respect and spoken positively about Islam, however he has not publicly declared his religion.

During a visit in Qatar, Watkins was praising Allah by doing the salat; he has also been seen praying in Abu Dhabi.

== Discography ==
=== Extended plays ===
List of EPs, with selected details
| Title | EP details |
|---|---|
| Trip 2 Brazil | Released: March 24, 2024; Label: Warner Records; Format: Digital download, streaming |
| Speed Gang | Released: August 1, 2025; Label: Warner Records; Format: Digital download, streaming |

=== Singles ===
List of singles, with selected chart positions
| Title | Year | Peak chart positions | | | | | Certifications | Album |
| Title | Year | IRE | NLD Tip | NZ Hot | SWE Heat. | UK | Certifications | Album |
|---|---|---|---|---|---|---|---|---|
| "Lying" | 2021 | — | — | — | — | — | | Non-album singles |
| "Dooty Booty" | 2021 | — | — | — | — | — | | Non-album singles |
| "Bounce That A$$" | 2021 | — | — | — | — | — | | Non-album singles |
| "One More Chance" | 2021 | — | — | — | — | — | | Non-album singles |
| "NFL Freestyle" | 2021 | — | — | — | — | — | | Non-album singles |
| "Shake" | 2021 | — | — | — | — | — | | Non-album singles |
| "Love In These Streets" | 2021 | — | — | — | — | — | | Non-album singles |
| "How I Feel" | 2021 | — | — | — | — | — | | Non-album singles |
| "I Dont Like You" | 2021 | — | — | — | — | — | | Non-album singles |
| "One Piece" | 2021 | — | — | — | — | — | | Non-album singles |
| "Shake Pt.2" | 2022 | — | — | — | — | — | | Non-album singles |
| "F.U.C." | 2022 | — | — | — | — | — | | Non-album singles |
| "God Is Good" | 2022 | — | — | — | — | — | | Non-album singles |
| "Ronaldo (Sewey)" | 2022 | — | — | — | — | — | | Non-album singles |
| "World Cup" | 2022 | 37 | 1 | 29 | 6 | 52 | RIAA: Gold; ZPAV: Gold | Non-album singles |
| "Dogs" (with Kai Cenat) | 2023 | — | — | — | — | — | | Non-album singles |
| "Portuginies" | 2023 | — | — | — | — | — | | Non-album singles |
| "Come My Way" | 2023 | — | — | — | — | — | | Non-album singles |
| "Monkey" | 2024 | — | — | — | — | — | | Trip 2 Brazil |
| "Get Down" | 2024 | — | — | — | — | — | | Trip 2 Brazil |
| "Higher" | 2025 | — | — | — | — | — (Note: "Higher" did not enter the UK Singles Chart, but peaked at number 56 on the UK Video Streaming Chart.) | | Speed Gang |
| "Fight to Win" | 2025 | — | — | — | — | — | | Speed Gang |
| "Bailar" | 2025 | — | — | — | — | — | | Speed Gang |
| "Big Girls" | 2025 | — | — | — | — | — | | Speed Gang |
| "Headshot / Gas in the Truck" | 2025 | — | — | — | — | — | | Speed Gang |
| "I Know" | 2025 | — | — | — | — | — | | Speed Gang |
| "World Cup (Champions)" | 2026 | — | 10 | 33 | — | — (Note: "World Cup (Champions)" did not enter the UK Singles Chart, but peaked at number three on the UK Video Streaming Chart.) | | FIFA World Cup 2026 Official Album |

== Filmography ==
Film
| Year | Title | Role | Notes | Ref. |
|---|---|---|---|---|
| 2024 | The Sidemen Story | Himself | Documentary; cameo | |
| 2024 | K-Pops! | Himself | Cameo | |
| 2026 | The Eyes of Ghana | —N/a | Documentary; producer | |

Television
| Year | Title | Role | Notes | Ref. |
|---|---|---|---|---|
| 2024 | WrestleMania XL | Himself | Disguised as Prime bottle | |
| 2024–2026 | WWE Monday Night RAW | Himself | 5 episodes | |
| 2025 | Royal Rumble: Indianapolis | Himself | Entrant 8 | |
| 2025 | CBS Sports Golazo | Himself | | |
| 2025 | Speed Goes Pro | Himself | Five-part YouTube series | |
| 2026 | WrestleMania 42 | Himself | Competed in six-man tag team match | |
| TBA | IShowSpeed | Himself | Anime series co-produced with Big Shot Pictures | |

List of music video appearances
| Year | Title | Artist(s) | Role | Ref. |
|---|---|---|---|---|
| 2022 | "Let's Go" | Tion Wayne feat. Aitch | Himself | |
| 2022 | "Don't Lie" | A1 x J1 feat. Nemzzz | Himself | |
| 2024 | "Where Do I Go" | Vikkstar, Nicky Romero, Alpharock and Oaks | Himself | |

== Awards and nominations ==
Awards and nominations for IShowSpeed
| Year | Ceremony | Category | Nominated work | Result | Ref. |
|---|---|---|---|---|---|
| 2022 | Streamy Awards | Streamer of the Year | —N/a | Nominated | |
| 2022 | Streamy Awards | Breakout Streamer | —N/a | Won | |
| 2023 | Streamy Awards | Streamer of the Year | —N/a | Nominated | |
| 2023 | Streamy Awards | Variety Streamer | —N/a | Won | |
| 2024 | The Streamer Awards | Get Off Your A** Award (Best IRL Streamer) | —N/a | Won | |
| 2024 | The Streamer Awards | Best International Streamer | —N/a | Won | |
| 2024 | The Streamer Awards | Streamer of the Year | —N/a | Won | |
| 2024 | GOAL Champions Awards | Most Influential Soccer Creator | —N/a | Won | |
| 2025 | Kids' Choice Awards | Favorite Gamer | —N/a | Won | |
| 2025 | The Streamer Awards | Streamer of the Year | —N/a | Won | |
| 2025 | The Streamer Awards | Best IRL Streamer | —N/a | Won | |
| 2025 | The Streamer Awards | Best Marathon Stream | Speed Does America | Nominated | |
| 2025 | Esports Awards | Streamer of the Year | —N/a | Won | |
| 2026 | Esports Awards | Streamer of the Year | —N/a | Pending | |
| 2026 | Kids' Choice Awards | Favorite Male Creator | —N/a | Nominated | |
| 2026 | The Streamer Awards | Best IRL Streamer | —N/a | Won | |
| 2026 | The Streamer Awards | Best Marathon Stream | Minecraft Marathon with Kai Cenat | Nominated | |
| 2026 | The Streamer Awards | Best Streamed Series | World Cup Tour | Won | |
| 2026 | The Streamer Awards | Streamer of the Year | —N/a | Won | |
| 2026 | The Game Awards | Content Creator of the Year | —N/a | Pending | |
