= John Pring (journalist) =

British disability journalist

- Known for: Disability journalism
- Notable work: The Department: How a Violent Government Bureaucracy Killed Hundreds and Hid the Evidence
- Website: disabilitynewsservice.com

John Pring is a British journalist who runs Disability News Service, a news agency dedicated to covering disabled news within the United Kingdom. Pring has published three books and been involved in the Deaths by Welfare Project and the 2023 Museum of Austerity exhibition.

== Disability News Service ==
In April 2009, Pring founded the Disability News Service (DNS), which focuses on news stories related to disability discrimination, benefits, and human rights within the UK. Pring runs the news service from his home in Reading, Berkshire and funds it through a mix of savings, reader donations, and charitable organisation subscriptions.

In September 2015, it was reported that the Department for Work and Pensions (DWP) had begun refusing to communicate with Pring. The DWP claimed Pring had published several stories that excluded information the DWP had provided. Pring claimed that this was due to the press officers missing his deadlines, while the DWP said he should have later published corrections. As a result, the DWP claimed they were unable to treat the DNS as a bona fide news organisation.

The DNS has pushed for more transparency from the DWP, especially in relation to their Internal Process Review documents, which the DWP produces following a claimant suicide. The DWP began conducting these investigations in 2012, but refused to publish any recommendations from the investigations. Since 2020, Pring has attempted to obtain these documents through freedom of information requests but the DWP has refused to share them. Pring took his case to the Information Commissioner's Office who ruled in October 2022 that the DWP had to publish the documents. The DWP appealed the decision, but withdrew it's appeal in March 2023. Pring finally revived the redacted documents in April 2023.

In January 2020, DNS reported on Errol Graham's inquest, being the first news outlet to break the story. Graham was a disabled man who starved to death in 2018, months after the DWP stopped his benefits. His body was found, weighing just over 4 stone, by bailiffs who had broken down his door to evict him. The coroner in Graham's case considered the loss of his income as a contributing factor to his death and the story was subsequently picked up by national newsrooms in the UK.

== Deaths by Welfare Project ==
In 2021, Pring co-created the Deaths by Welfare project alongside China Mills, who runs Healing Justice London. Mills approached Pring with the idea of creating a timeline that would lay out how policy decisions related to UK welfare had led to the deaths of disabled people. The pair worked with other disabled activists to create a searchable timeline that Mills' uses to argue is proof of state violence.

== Additional work ==
Pring has published two books about abuse that occurred in the Buckinghamshire County Council Longcare care home. His first book, Silent Victims: The Longcare Scandal and Britain's Continuing Failure to Protect Society's Most Vulnerable, was published in 2003. His second book, Longcare Survivors: The Biography of a Care Scandal, was published in 2011 and covered the abuse that occurred in Longcare, where the residents are now, and the impact the scandal has had on the social care system.

In 2024, Pring published The Department: How a Violent Government Bureaucracy Killed Hundreds and Hid the Evidence. The book covers cases of deaths that have been linked to the DWP, with Pring arguing the DWP has made applying for and staying on benefits intentionally difficult, to help keep governmental spending costs down. A crowdfunded campaign subsequently sent a copy of the book to every Labour member of Parliament (totaling more than 400 books).

Pring was the specialist advisor and co-editor of the 2023 Museum of Austerity exhibition, which was held at HOME (Manchester). The work was directed by Sacha Wares and required attendees to wear a virtual reality headset to see actors who represent people who have died following the loss of their benefits. Their stories are narrated by family members of the deceased and are in stark comparison to the overlaid audio of politicians criticising the DWP for being too generous.

== Bibliography ==
- Pring, John (2003). Silent Victims: The Longcare Scandal and Britain's Continuing Failure to Protect Society's Most Vulnerable. Gibson Square Books. ISBN 978-1903933190.
- Pring, John (1 May 2011). Longcare Survivors: The Biography of a Care Scandal. Disability News Service. ISBN 978-0956892201.
- Pring, John (August 2024). The Department: How a Violent Government Bureaucracy Killed Hundreds and Hid the Evidence. Pluto Press. ISBN 9780745349893.
