= List of FIFA World Cup songs and anthems =

List of anthems of all FIFA World Cups

FIFA World Cup songs and anthems are tunes and songs adopted officially by FIFA (or by official broadcasters and partners selected by FIFA), to be used prior to the World Cup event and to accompany the championships during the event. They are used as theme music for TV broadcasts and also used in advertising campaigns for the World Cup.

The chosen songs are usually multilingual and include English, the official language of the organizing country, languages of certain FIFA Partners regions and/or other languages. The main versions also result in cover versions in many other languages performed by the original or by local artists.

== Official songs and anthems by FIFA ==
| Edition | Host country | Designation | Title | Language(s) | Performer(s) | Writer(s) and producer(s) |
|---|---|---|---|---|---|---|
| 1990 | Italy | Official song | "Un'estate italiana" / "To Be Number One (Summer 1990)" | Italian; English | Edoardo Bennato and Gianna Nannini; Giorgio Moroder Project featuring Paul Engemann | Giorgio Moroder, Edoardo Bennato, Gianna Nannini and Tom Whitlock |
| 1994 | United States | Official theme song | "Gloryland" / "In Gloria" | English; Spanish | Daryl Hall and Sounds of Blackness | Charlie Skarbek and Rick Blaskey; Casey Porter (Spanish Version) |
| 1998 | France | Official song | "La Copa de la Vida" / "The Cup of Life" | English; Spanish | Ricky Martin | Desmond Child, Luis Gómez-Escolar and Robi Rosa |
| 1998 | France | Official anthem | "La Cour des Grands" / "Do You Mind If I Play" / "Con Vosotros Sueño" | French; English; Spanish | Youssou N'Dour and Axelle Red (Note: Axelle Red is not featured on "Do You Mind If I Play", except for some background vocals.) | Youssou N'Dour, Jon Sharp, Simon Richmond, Steve Hopwood, Nick Patrick and Pierre Bianchi |
| 2002 | South Korea; Japan | Official song | "Boom" | English | Anastacia | Anastacia and Glen Ballard |
| 2002 | South Korea; Japan | Official anthem | "Anthem" | None (Instrumental) | Vangelis | Vangelis / Takkyu Ishino |
| 2002 | South Korea; Japan | Official Korea/Japan song | "Let's Get Together Now" | Korean; Japanese | Voices of KOREA/JAPAN | Daisuke Kawaguchi, Kim Hyung-Suk, Yoshimitsu Sawamoto, Kiyoshi Matsuo and Lena Park |
| 2006 | Germany | Official song | "The Time of Our Lives" | English; Spanish | Il Divo featuring Toni Braxton | Jörgen Elofsson and Steve Mac |
| 2006 | Germany | Official anthem | "Zeit, dass sich was dreht" / "Celebrate The Day" / "Fetez Cette Journee" | German; English; French; Bambara | Herbert Grönemeyer featuring Amadou & Mariam | Amadou Bagayoko, Mariam Doumbia, Herbert Grönemeyer and Alex Silva |
| 2006 | Germany | Official mascot song | "Love Generation" | English | Bob Sinclar, Gary Pine | Jean-Guy Schreiner, Christophe Le Friant |
| 2010 | South Africa | Official song | "Waka Waka (This Time for Africa)" / "Waka Waka (Esto es África)" | English; Spanish isiXhosa; Fang | Shakira featuring Freshlyground | Shakira, J. Hill, Kojidie and Ze Bell Jean Paul |
| 2010 | South Africa | Official anthem | "Sign of a Victory" | English | R. Kelly featuring the Soweto Spiritual Singers | Robert Kelly |
| 2010 | South Africa | Official mascot song | "Game On" | English | Pitbull, TKZee and Dario G | Paul Spencer, Armando Perez, Narinder Singh and Jimmy Westerlund |
| 2014 | Brazil | Official song | "We Are One (Ole Ola)" | English; Portuguese; Spanish | Pitbull featuring Jennifer Lopez and Claudia Leitte | Jennifer Lopez, Claudia Leitte, Armando C. Pérez, Thomas Troelsen, Danny Mercer, Sia Furler, Lukasz Gottwald, Henry Walter and RedOne |
| 2014 | Brazil | Official anthem | "Dar um Jeito (We Will Find a Way)" | English; Portuguese; Spanish | Carlos Santana featuring Wyclef Jean, Avicii and Alexandre Pires | Alexandre Pires, Arash Pournouri; Rami Yacoub, Carl Falk, Tim Bergling; Arnon Woolfson, Diogo Vianna and Wyclef Jean |
| 2014 | Brazil | Official mascot song | "Tatu Bom de Bola" | Portuguese | Arlindo Cruz | Arlindo Cruz |
| 2018 | Russia | Official song | "Live It Up" | English; Spanish | Nicky Jam featuring Will Smith and Era Istrefi | Nick Rivera, Willard Carroll Smith II, Era Istrefi, Thomas Wesley Pentz, Jean-Baptiste, Quavious Marshall, Jocelyn Donald, The Picard Brothers, Juan Diego Medina Vélez and Michael McHenry |
| 2022 (Note: For 2022, FIFA released a multi-song official soundtrack rather than promoting a single official song in the traditional format. "FIFA World Cup Official Soundtrack kicks off with Hayya Hayya (Better Together)". 2022-12-05. Archived from the original on 2022-12-05.) | Qatar | Official theme | "The Official FIFA World Cup Qatar 2022 Theme" | None (instrumental) | Zachary Aaron Golden | |
| 2022 | Qatar | Official FIFA Fan Festival anthem | "Tukoh Taka" | English; Spanish; Arabic | Nicki Minaj, Maluma and Myriam Fares | David Macias, Diamante Anthony Blackmon, Donny Flores, Gary Walker, Illimite, Juan Luis Londoño Arias, Juan Salinas, Monique Fonseca-Luchese, Myriam Fares, Onika Maraj, Oscar Salinas, Raul Antonio Treviño, Sari Abboud, Steven Cespedes and Wassim Salibi |
| 2026 | Canada; Mexico; United States | Official song | "Dai Dai" | English; Spanish (Note: Also includes a phrase each in French, Italian and Japanese.) | Shakira and Burna Boy | Shakira Mebarak, Alexander Castillo Vasquez, Ahmed Saghir, Ed Sheeran and Jon Bellion |
| 2026 | Canada; Mexico; United States | Official anthem | "DNA (More Than a Game)" | English; Italian; Korean | Andrea Bocelli, David Guetta, EJae and Megan Thee Stallion | Andrea Bocelli, David Guetta, Kim Eun-jae, Megan J. Pete, Giovanni Damiani, Giorgio Tuinfort, Lucas and Felix Hain, Bobby D. Session Jr., Ashley Milton, Daniel Goudie, Francesco Pasquero, Norma Jean Martine, Timofey Reznikov, Giovanni Damiani và Conor Ross |
| 2026 | Canada; Mexico; United States | Official theme | "The Official FIFA World Cup 26 Theme" | None (instrumental) | Zachary Aaron Golden | |
| 2030 | Morocco; Portugal; Spain | TBD | TBD | TBD | TBD | TBD |
| 2034 | Saudi Arabia | TBD | TBD | TBD | TBD | TBD |

== Official albums and selected tracks ==
This section lists official FIFA World Cup albums and selected tracks from those albums or soundtracks.

=== Official albums ===
| Year | Album Name |
|---|---|
| 1994 | Gloryland: World Cup USA 94 (Note: Also released under the title of "Soccer Rocks the Globe World Cup USA 94" in the USA and Canada.) |
| 1998 | Allez! Ola! Olé!: Music of the World Cup (Note: Released as "Allez! Ola! Olé!: L'Album Officiel De La Coupe Du Monde" in France, "Allez! Ola! Olé!: Das Offizielle WM-Album" in Germany and "Allez! Ola! Olé!: El Album Oficial De La Copa Del Mundo" in Spain.) |
| 2002 | The Official Album of the 2002 FIFA World Cup (Note: Also released under the title of "Fever Pitch: The Official Music of The 2002 FIFA World Cup" in Australia and Japan, and "Fever Pitch: Música Oficial De La Copa Mundial De la FIFA 2002" in Argentina and Mexico.) |
| 2002 | 2002 FIFA World Cup Official Album: Songs of Korea/Japan |
| 2006 | Voices from the FIFA World Cup |
| 2006 | Goleo VI Presents His 2006 FIFA World Cup Hits |
| 2010 | Listen Up! The Official 2010 FIFA World Cup Album |
| 2014 | One Love, One Rhythm – The 2014 FIFA World Cup Official Album |
| 2018 | FIFA World Cup Russia 2018 Official Playlist |
| 2022 | FIFA World Cup Qatar 2022 Official Soundtrack |
| 2026 | The Official FIFA World Cup 26 Host City Themes |
| 2026 | The Official FIFA World Cup 2026 Album |

=== Selected tracks from official albums and soundtracks ===
| Edition | Host country | Title | Language(s) | Performer(s) | Writer(s) and producer(s) |
|---|---|---|---|---|---|
| 1994 | United States | "We Are the Champions" | English | Queen | Freddie Mercury |
| 1998 | France | "Rendez-Vous 98" | Instrumental | Jean Michel Jarre and Apollo 440 | Jean Michel Jarre and Apollo 440 |
| 1998 | France | "Together Now" | English | Jean Michel Jarre, Tetsuya Komuro and Olivia Lufkin | Jean Michel Jarre, Tetsuya Komuro and Olivia Lufkin |
| 1998 | France | "Top of the World (Olé, Olé, Olé)" | English | Chumbawamba | Chumbawamba |
| 2002 | South Korea; Japan | "Live For Love United" | English; French; Various other languages | Love United | Pascal Obispo, Desmond Child and Sam Stoner |
| 2006 | Germany | "Hips Don't Lie - Bamboo (2006 FIFA World Cup Mix)" | English; Spanish | Shakira featuring Wyclef Jean | Bilal Hajji, Jerry Duplessis, LaTavia Parker, Nadir Khayat, Omar Alfanno, Ramiro Agulla, Shakira and Wyclef Jean |
| 2006 | Germany | "Dance!" | English | Lumidee and Fatman Scoop | Cordel Burrell, George Merrill, Isaac Freeman III, Lumidee, Shannon Rubicam, Andreas Litterscheid and Reinhard Raith |
| 2006 | Germany | "All Together Now (Strong Together)" | English | Atomic Kitten | Nicole Tyler, Peter Hooton, Reinhard Raith, Steve Grimes, Wolfgang Boss and Andreas Litterscheid |
| 2006 | Germany | "Stand Up!" –Champions' Theme | English | Patrizio Buanne | Henri Belolo, Jacques Morali, Nicole Tyler, Wolfgang Boss and Christian Seitz |
| 2014 | Brazil | "Vida" | Spanish; English; Portuguese | Ricky Martin | Elijah King, Ricky Martin and Salaam Remi |
| 2014 | Brazil | "La La La (Brazil 2014)" | English; Portuguese; Spanish | Shakira featuring Carlinhos Brown | Carlinhos Brown, Henry Walter, Jay Singh, John J. Conte Jr., Lukasz Gottwald, Mathieu Jomphe-Lepine, Max Martin, Raelene Arreguin and Shakira |
| 2014 | Brazil | "Olé (Stadium Anthem Mix" | English | Adelén | Ina Wroldsen and Quiz & Larossi |
| 2022 | Qatar | "Hayya Hayya (Better Together)" | English | Trinidad Cardona, Davido and AISHA | David Adedeji Adeleke, Trinidad Cardona and Nadir Khayat |
| 2022 | Qatar | "Arhbo" | Arabic; Spanish; French | Ozuna, GIMS and RedOne | Nadir Khayat, Juan Rosado and Gandhi Alimasi Djuna |
| 2022 | Qatar | "Light The Sky" | English; Hindi | Nora Fatehi, Balqees, Rahma Riad, Manal and RedOne | Nadir Khayat, Pat Devine, Adil Khayat, Kamikaz, Steph and Aditya Prateek Singh Sisodia |
| 2022 | Qatar | "Dreamers" | English; Arabic | Jung Kook (featuring Fahad Al Kubaisi in the official music video version) | Jeon Jung-kook, Mustapha El Ouardi, Pat Devine and Nadir Khayat |
| 2026 | Canada; Mexico; United States | "Siir Siir" | English; French (Note: Also includes a phrase each in Moroccan Darija (Arabic), Arabic.) | Nora Fatehi, Vegedream and Sanjoy | Nora Fatehi, Vegedream, Jesse Bluu, Russell Ali and Theron Thomas |
| 2026 | Canada; Mexico; United States | "Lighter" | English; Spanish | Jelly Roll and Carín León | Jason DeFord, Jon Randall, Jessi Alexander, Jessie Jo Dillon, Manuel Lorente, Édgar Barrera, Daniel Rondón and Henry Walter |
| 2026 | Canada; Mexico; United States | "Por Ella" | Spanish | Belinda and Los Ángeles Azules | Tainy, Horacio Palencia, Elías Mejía Avante, Diego Bollella Urtusastegui, Belinda Peregrín, Jota Rosa and Albert Hype |
| 2026 | Canada; Mexico; United States | "Echo" | English; Spanish | Daddy Yankee and Shenseea | Tainy, Ibrahim Maalouf, Massari, Adium, Jota Rosa and Albert Hype |
| 2026 | Canada; Mexico; United States | "Illuminate" | English; Arabic | Jessie Reyez and Elyanna | Henry Walter and Connor McDonough |
| 2026 | Canada; Mexico; United States | "Goals" | English; Spanish; Portuguese | Lisa, Anitta and Rema | Henry Walter, Connor McDonough, Andre Murilo da Silva, Bava, Divine Ikubor, Ze Gonzales, Kyle Buckley, Anitta and Ricardo Andrés Fagundo |
| 2026 | Canada; Mexico; United States | "Game Time" | English | Future and Tyla | Henry Walter, Nayvadius DeMun Cash, Tyla Laura Seethal, Jake Torrey, Jessica Agombar, Omer Fedi and KayCyy |
| 2026 | Canada; Mexico; United States | "World Cup (Champions)" | English (Note: Also include phrase in Spanish) | IShowSpeed | IShowSpeed, Doobie Newton, RiotUSA, Pink Slip, Vibarco, Olivier Francois and Shonci |
| 2026 | Canada; Mexico; United States | "(Host City) Theme x FIFA World Cup 26" – Official FIFA World Cup 26 Sonic IDs ("The Official FIFA World Cup 26 Theme" remixes by producers selected by each host city) | Kansas City – English Others – None (Instrumental) | | Atlanta – Dallas Austin; Boston – Ben Zakharenko, Dayvin, Berklee College of Music; Dallas – Tre Nagella; Guadalajara – Bautista; Houston – Bombón; Kansas City – Tech N9ne; Los Angeles – DJ Flict; Mexico City – Mexican Institute of Sound; Miami – Mr. NaisGai; Monterrey – Toy Selectah; New York/New Jersey – Take a Daytrip; Philadelphia – DJ Jazzy Jeff; San Francisco Bay Area – Dan the Automator; Seattle – Sango; Toronto – Hill Kourkoutis; Vancouver – Grayson Repp; Original theme - Zachary Aaron Golden |
| 2030 | Morocco; Portugal; Spain | TBD | TBD | TBD | TBD |
| 2034 | Saudi Arabia | TBD | TBD | TBD | TBD |

== Promotional songs by FIFA partners and sponsors ==
| Edition | Host country | Partner / campaign | Title | Language(s) | Performer(s) | Writer(s) and producer(s) |
|---|---|---|---|---|---|---|
| 2010 | South Africa | Coca-Cola campaign anthem | "Wavin' Flag" (Coca-Cola Celebration Mix) | English regional versions | K'Naan | K'naan, Ebrahim Dhooma, Bruno Mars, Philip Lawrence and Jean Daval |
| 2014 | Brazil | Coca-Cola campaign anthem | "The World Is Ours" | English | David Correy, Aloe Blacc, Ira Losco and Monobloco | Adam Schmalholz, Aloe Blacc and Rock Mafia |
| 2018 | Russia | Coca-Cola campaign anthem | "Colors" | English; Spanish; Arabic (Saudi, Egyptian, Moroccan, Tunisian versions); Urdu | Jason Derulo, Maluma, Aseel, Lil Eazy, Tamer Hosny, Douzi, Si Lemhaf, Qurat-ul-Ain Balouch | Jason Derulo, Jamie Sanderson, Nija Charles, Ishmael Sadiq Montague, Geoffrey Earley, Diamond Platnumz, Sermstyle and ISM |
| 2022 | Qatar | Ooredoo campaign song | "Arhbo (Arabic version)" | Arabic | Nasser Al-Kubaisi, Ayed, and Haneen Hussein | Hameed Al-Bloushi and Nadir Khayat |
| 2022 | Qatar | Budweiser campaign anthem | "The World Is Yours To Take" | English | Tears for Fears featuring Lil Baby | Roland Orzabal, Ian Stanley, Chris Hughes, Dominique Jones, Kevin Andre Price, Jacquez Lowe, Jordan Holt-May and Joshua I. Parker |
| 2022 | Qatar | Coca-Cola campaign anthem | "A Kind of Magic" | English; Arabic | Danna Paola, Felukah and Tamtam | Roger Taylor and David Richards |
| 2022 | Qatar | Hyundai "Goal of the Century" campaign song | "Yet to Come" | Korean; English | BTS | Dan Gleyzer, J-Hope, Max, Pdogg, RM and Suga |
| 2022 | Qatar | Qatar Airways campaign anthem | "C.H.A.M.P.I.O.N.S" | Arabic; French; English | DJ Rodge and Cheb Khaled | |
| 2026 | Canada; Mexico; United States | Coca-Cola campaign anthem | "JUMP" | English; Spanish | J Balvin, Amber Mark, Travis Barker and Steve Vai | Michael Anthony, David Lee Roth, Alex Van Halen and Edward Van Halen |
| 2026 | Canada; Mexico; United States | Coca-Cola campaign anthem | "JUMP" | English; Spanish | J Balvin, Amber Mark, Travis Barker and Steve Vai | Additional Remix Version with Pedro Sampaio |
| 2026 | Canada; Mexico; United States | Buchanan's campaign anthem | "Dando Vueltas" | Spanish | Rauw Alejandro | Nino K. Segarra, Eduardo Cabra, Rauw Alejandro, Edgar Barrera, Andrés Jael Correa Rios and Sebastián Otero |
| 2030 | Morocco; Portugal; Spain | TBD | TBD | TBD | TBD | TBD |
| 2034 | Saudi Arabia | TBD | TBD | TBD | TBD | TBD |

== Other notable songs and anthems ==
| Edition | Host country | Title | Language(s) | Performer(s) | Writer(s) and producer(s) |
|---|---|---|---|---|---|
| 1930 | Uruguay | "Uruguayos Campeones" | Spanish | José Pepino Ministeri | Omar Odriozola |
| 1934 | Italy | "Canzone Azzurra" | Italian | Mario Mariotti | Ennio Neri and Luciano Luigi Martelli |
| 1938 | France | Untitled or Unknown – Official Film Soundtrack | None (Instrumental) | Roger-Roger | |
| 1950 | Brazil | "Marcha do Scratch Brasileiro" | Portuguese | Lamartine Babo | Lamartine Babo and Jorge Goulart |
| 1954 | Switzerland | Untitled or Unknown – Official Film Soundtrack | None (Instrumental) | Emil Ferstl | |
| 1958 | Sweden | "VM Marsch" | None (Instrumental) | Royal Swedish Army Band | Egon Kjerrman |
| 1962 | Chile | "El Rock del Mundial" | Spanish | Los Ramblers | Jorge Rojas Astorga |
| 1966 | England | "World Cup Willie (Where in this World are We Going)" | English | Lonnie Donegan | Syd Green |
| 1970 | Mexico | "Fútbol México 70" | Spanish | Los Hermanos Zavala | Roberto do Nascimento |
| 1974 | West Germany | "Fussball Ist Unser Leben" | German | Germany national football team | Jack White |
| 1974 | West Germany | "Futbol" | English; German; Russian; Spanish; Polish | Maryla Rodowicz | Jonasz Kofta, Leszek Bogdanowicz |
| 1974 | West Germany | "World Cup Fanfare" | None (Instrumental) | Max Greger And His Orchestra | Werner Drexler |
| 1978 | Argentina | "El Mundial" – Known for Official Song | Spanish, Debatable (Instrumental) | Buenos Aires Municipal Symphony | Ennio Morricone |
| 1982 | Spain | "El Mundial" – Known for Official Song | Spanish | Plácido Domingo | Alfredo Garrido and José Torregrosa |
| 1986 | Mexico | "El mundo unido por un balón" – Known for Official Song | Spanish | Juan Carlos Abara | Juan Carlos Abara |
| 1986 | Mexico | "A Special Kind of Hero" – Official Film Soundtrack | English | Stephanie Lawrence | Rick Wakeman |
| 1986 | Mexico | "Hot Hot Hot" | English | Arrow | Alphonsus Cassell and Leston Paul |
| 1990 | Italy | "Za Ayi Neyi" – Official Film Soundtrack | | Les Têtes Brulées | Les Têtes Brulées |
| 1994 | United States | "Two Billion Hearts" – Official Film Soundtrack | English | Gary Stockdale | Lalo Schifrin, Marie Cain, and Gary Stockdale |
| 1998 | France | "Carnaval de Paris" | None (Instrumental) | Dario G | Dario G |
| 2006 | Germany | "Arriba, Arriba" | Spanish | Ana Bárbara, Mariana Seoane, Anaís Martínez, Pablo Montero | |
| 2010 | South Africa | "Oh Africa" – Pepsi Promotional Anthem | English | Akon, Keri Hilson | Timothy Thomas, Theron Thomas |
| 2010 | South Africa | "Everywhere You Go" – MTN Promotional Anthem | English | Kelly Rowland, 2face, Didier Awadi, Jose Chameleone, Jozi, Krotal, Rola Saad, Samini, Slikour & Kwesta, Zuluboy | Stacy Barthe, Steve Morales, Beni Okwenje |
| 2014 | Brazil | "The World Is Ours" | English | David Correy, Monobloco | Rock Mafia, Mario Caldato Jr., Joey Altruda, Andy Bloch & Edmund Thomas Dunne |
| 2014 | Brazil | "La Copa de Todos" – Coca-Cola Promotional Anthem Spanish Mix | Spanish; English | David Correy, Paty Cantú, Wisin, Monobloco | |
| 2014 | Brazil | "Magic in the Air" | French | Magic System, Chawki | Magic System (A'Salfo, Manadja, Goudé and Tino), RedOne, Ahmed Chawki |
| 2014 | Brazil | "Assaf 360" | Arabic; English | Mohammed Assaf | |
| 2014 | Brazil | "Time Of Our Lives" – beIN SPORTS Promotional Anthem | English | Chawki | Nadir Khayat, Chawki, Aziz Mahfoud, Mohamed el Mrabet, Travon Potts |
| 2018 | Russia | "Komanda 2018" (Команда 2018, Team 2018) | Russian | DJ Smash featuring Egor Kreed and Polina Gagarina | DJ Smash |
| 2018 | Russia | "United by Love" | English, Spanish, Russian | Natalia Oreiro | Ettore Grenci, Sonia Molina, Diego Córdoba |
| 2018 | Russia | "I'm the One" | English | DJ Khaled featuring Justin Bieber, Quavo, Chance the Rapper, and Lil Wayne | DJ Khaled, Justin Bieber, Quavo, Chance the Rapper, Lil Wayne, Nic Nac, Poo Bear, Bobby Brackins, David Park, August 08 |
| 2018 | Russia | "Love" | English, Spanish | Gianluca Vacchi and Sebastián Yatra | Gianluca Vacchi, Sebastián Yatra |
| 2018 | Russia | "Ramenez la coupe à la maison" – French Team Song | French | Vegedream | Vegedream, Ken "Evasion" Bora |
| 2022 | Qatar | "MLK É LUZ, AL RIHLA" – Adidas Official Match Ball 'Al Rihla' Song | Portuguese | MC Kekel | MC Kekel; DJ Luck Muzic |
| 2022 | Qatar | "Tahayya" | Arabic; English | Humood and Maher Zain | Humood; Maher Zain; Hamzah Jamjoom; Ahmed AlYafie; Talal |
| 2022 | Qatar | "Be Like Him" | Chinese | Namewee; Priscilla Abby | |
| 2022 | Qatar | "Ya Gamila" | Arabic; English; Chinese | Namewee; Yasin Sulaiman | |
| 2022 | Qatar | "Ezz Al Arab" | Arabic; English | Wegz | |
| 2022 | Qatar | "World Cup" | English | IShowSpeed | Darren Watkins Jr., Joe Grasso, Ryan Wage |
| 2022 | Qatar | "Muchachos, ahora nos volvimos a ilusionar" – Argentina Team Song | Spanish | La Mosca Tsé - Tsé | Guillermo Novellis, Sergio Cairat, Fernando Romero |
| 2026 | Canada; Mexico; United States | "Rasa-Rasa Bola" – Coca-Cola Malaysia Promotional Anthem | Malay | Tomok | Tomok |
| 2026 | Canada; Mexico; United States | "USA - Take Me to America" – Bosnian Fan Anthem | Bosnian; English | Dubioza Kolektiv | Dubioza Kolektiv |
| 2026 | Canada; Mexico; United States | "Kira" – Adidas Japan Promotional Anthem | Japanese | Ado | Tatsuya Kitani; Norikatsu Teruuchi |
| 2026 | Canada; Mexico; United States | "Bate no Peito" – Official Brazil Team Anthem | Portuguese | Papatinho, Ludmilla, João Gomes, Zeca Pagodinho, Samuel Rosa and Veigh | Tiago da Cal Alves; João Fernando Gomes Valério; Ângelo Vitor Simplício da Silva; Rodrigo Scarcello; Nagalli |
| 2026 | Canada; Mexico; United States | "É Tuga Ou Nada" – Official Portugal Supporters Song | Portuguese | Sam the Kid, Sir Scratch, Gson, Bispo and Papillon | Samuel Martins Torres Santiago Mira; Ben António; Gerson Costa; Pedro Bispo; Papillon |
| 2026 | Canada; Mexico; United States | "Un Solo Corazón" – Official Mexico Team Anthem | Spanish | Grupo Frontera | Edgar Barrera; Luis Miguel Gomez Castaño |
| 2026 | Canada; Mexico; United States | "AlNashama" – Official Jordan Team Anthem | Arabic; English | Hussein Al-Salman, Yara Mustafa | RedOne; Hussein Al-Salman; Yara Mustafa |
| 2026 | Canada; Mexico; United States | "Mama Wa' (The Blue Wave)" – Official Curaçao Supporters Song | Papiamento | Jeon | Jonathan Bryan Thiel |
| 2026 | Canada; Mexico; United States | "Dodouble" | | Tony Mix, T-ANSYTO, J Perry, Shabba, K-dilak, Kenny Haiti | Tony Mix, T-ANSYTO, Thony Mahotiere, Hantz Fred Mercier, Jonathan Perry Manual, Joubite Dessalines, Herve Antenor, Kenny Stinvil |
| 2026 | Canada; Mexico; United States | "La Niña Futbolista" – Official Mexico City Anthem | Spanish | Julieta Venegas | Julieta Venegas, Yamil Rezc |
| 2026 | Canada; Mexico; United States | "All in för Sverige" | Swedish | Brandsta City Släckers | Anderz Wrethov, Elin Wrethov, Kristofer Strandberg, Robert Skowronski |
| 2026 | Canada; Mexico; United States | "Vikingblod" | Norwegian | Oljeberget | Oljeberget, Katastrofe |
| 2026 | Canada; Mexico; United States | "Follow Me" | | French Montana, Jihyo, Ludmilla, Adriana C | RedOne, Karim Kharbouch, Pat Devine, Julimar Santos, Ludmilla, Steph D, Steph Elouardi |
| 2026 | Canada; Mexico; United States | "Cả thế giới cùng mơ" – AI Generated Song | Vietnamese | AI/T Ái Trinh | Thái Nguyên |
| 2026 | Canada; Mexico; United States | "Welcome To The Land Of The Free" – AI Generated Song | English | Jason Stills | Jason Carl Garnsey, unknown generative AI platform |
| 2030 | Morocco; Portugal; Spain | TBD | TBD | TBD | TBD |
| 2034 | Saudi Arabia | TBD | TBD | TBD | TBD |

== Broadcaster theme music ==
| Edition | Host country | Broadcaster | Title | Language(s) | Performer(s) | Writer(s) and producer(s) |
|---|---|---|---|---|---|---|
| 1970 | Mexico | BBC | "Mexico Grandstand" | | Syd Lawrence | Syd Lawrence |
| 1970 | Mexico | ITV | "The World at their Feet" | | John Shakespeare | John Shakespeare |
| 1970 | Mexico | Globo | "Pra Frente Brasil" | Portuguese | | Miguel Gustavo |
| 1974 | West Germany | BBC | "Striker" | | The Anthony King Orchestra | Benson and Lewis |
| 1974 | West Germany | ITV | "Lap of Honour" | | London Stadium Orchestra | Mike Vickers |
| 1978 | Argentina | BBC | "Argentine Melody (Cancion de Argentina)" | | San Jose featuring Rodriguez Argentina | Andrew Lloyd Webber |
| 1978 | Argentina | ITV | "Action Argentina" | | South Bank Team | Alan Tew |
| 1978 | Argentina | Globo | "Corrente 78" | Portuguese | Coral do Joab | Alberto Luiz and Amélia Meirelles |
| 1982 | Spain | BBC | "Jellicle Ball" | | Royal Philharmonic Orchestra | Andrew Lloyd Webber |
| 1982 | Spain | ITV | "Matador" | | Jeff Wayne | Jeff Wayne |
| 1986 | Mexico | BBC | "Aztec Lightning" | | Heads | |
| 1986 | Mexico | ITV | "Aztec Gold" | | Silsoe | Rod Argent |
| 1986 | Mexico | Globo | "Mexicoração" | Portuguese | Aerobanda | Michael Sullivan, Paulo Massadas, and Luís Campos |
| 1990 | Italy | Global | "Un'estate italiana (To Be Number One)" – Official Song | Italian; English | Edoardo Bennato and Gianna Nannini (Italian); Giorgio Moroder Project (English) | Edoardo Bennato, Giorgio Moroder, Gianna Nannini and Tom Whitlock |
| 1990 | Italy | BBC | "Nessun dorma" | Italian | Luciano Pavarotti | Giacomo Puccini |
| 1990 | Italy | ITV | "Tutti al Mondo" | | Rod Argent and Peter Van Hooke | |
| 1990 | Italy | Globo | "Papa Essa Brasil" | Portuguese | Aerobanda | Michael Sullivan and Paulo Massadas |
| 1990 | Italy | Bandeirantes | Untitled theme song | Portuguese | | |
| 1990 | Italy | ARD | "Go Get The Cup" | English | David Hanselmann | Thomas Hen, Timothy Touchton, Klaus Jäger and Peter B. Herrmann |
| 1994 | United States | Global | "Gloryland" – Official Song | English | Daryl Hall and Sounds of Blackness | Charlie Skarbek and Rick Blaskey |
| 1994 | United States | BBC | "America" | English | Leonard Bernstein | Leonard Bernstein and Stephen Sondheim |
| 1994 | United States | ITV | "Gloryland" | English | Daryl Hall and Sounds of Blackness | Charlie Skarbek and Rick Blaskey |
| 1994 | United States | Globo | "Coração Verde e Amarelo" | Portuguese | Aerobanda | Aldir Blanc and Tavito Carvalho |
| 1998 | France | Global | Untitled or Unknown | | | |
| 1998 | France | BBC | "Pavane" | French | The Wimbledon Choral Society | Gabriel Fauré |
| 1998 | France | ITV | "Rendez-Vous" | | Jean-Michel Jarre and Apollo 440 | Jean-Michel Jarre |
| 1998 | France | Globo | "Coração Verde e Amarelo" | Portuguese | Aerobanda | Aldir Blanc and Tavito Carvalho |
| 2002 | South Korea; Japan | Global | "Anthem" – Official Anthem | None (Instrumental) | Vangelis | Vangelis, Takkyu Ishino |
| 2002 | South Korea; Japan | BBC | "Tarantula" | English | Faithless | Maxi Jazz, Sister Bliss and Rollo |
| 2002 | South Korea; Japan | ITV | "One Fine Day" | Italian | Opera Babes | Giacomo Puccini |
| 2002 | South Korea; Japan | NHK | "Mugen" | Japanese | Porno Graffitti | Haruichi Shindo |
| 2002 | South Korea; Japan | Univision | "Vamos Al Mundial" | Spanish | Jennifer Peña | Claudia Garcia |
| 2002 | South Korea; Japan | Sat.1 | "This Is My Time" | English | Sasha | Grant Michael B., Cosmo Klein, Kai Kumpann, Pomez di Lorenzo, Pete Boyd Smith, Sascha Schmitz, Grant Michael B. |
| 2002 | South Korea; Japan | Globo | "Festa" | Portuguese | Ivete Sangalo | Cunha |
| 2006 | Germany | Global | Untitled or Unknown | | | |
| 2006 | Germany | ARD | "A Place to Crash" | English | Robbie Williams | Robbie Williams and Stephen Duffy |
| 2006 | Germany | BBC | "Sports Prepare" | English | BBC Concert Orchestra & BBC Singers | Carl Davis, adapted from George Frideric Handel's "See the Conquering Hero Comes" |
| 2006 | Germany | ITV | "Heroes" | English | Kasabian | David Bowie & Brian Eno |
| 2006 | Germany | NHK | "Champione" | Japanese English | Orange Range | Orange Range & Satori Shiraishi |
| 2006 | Germany | NOS | "Wenn es passiert" | German | Wir sind Helden | Jean-Michel Tourette and Judith Holofernes |
| 2010 | South Africa | Global | Untitled or Unknown Known as Kinaa koo song | African, English, Xoasha | | |
| 2010 | South Africa | ARD | "Come Back As Heroes" | English | The Parlotones | |
| 2010 | South Africa | BBC | "Rainbow Nation" | English | The Dallas Guild | |
| 2010 | South Africa | ESPN; ABC | ESPN World Cup/Euros Theme | Instrumental | Joel Stevenett | Lisle Moore; Judd Maher |
| 2010 | South Africa | France Télévisions | Allez Ola Olé | French | Jessy Matador | Hugues Ducamin; Jacques Ballue |
| 2010 | South Africa | ITV | "When You Come Back" | English | Vusi Mahlasela | |
| 2010 | South Africa | NHK | "Tamashii Revolution" | Japanese | Superfly | Superfly |
| 2010 | South Africa | RTL | "Helele" | Zulu | Velile & Safri Duo | Jean Kluger, Daniel Vangarde, Velile Mchunu, Hardy Krech, Mark Nissen, Tonekind |
| 2010 | South Africa | ZDF | "Marchin On" | English | OneRepublic & Timbaland | Ryan Tedder |
| 2010 | South Africa | NOS | "Marabi" | Zulu | Mafikizolo | Theo Kgosinkwe and Oscar Mdlongwa |
| 2010 | South Africa | NOS | "Sunshine" | English | Ginger Ninja | Ginger Ninja |
| 2014 | Brazil | Global | Untitled or Unknown (although it has been known by the public as the "Oea Song" due the prominence of a woman singing "OEA" on the song) | | | |
| 2014 | Brazil | ARD | "Auf uns" | German | Andreas Bourani | Andreas Bourani, Tom Olbrich, Julius Hartog, Peter "Jem" Seifert |
| 2014 | Brazil | BBC | "Another Star" | English | Stevie Wonder | Stevie Wonder |
| 2014 | Brazil | beIN Sports | "Time of Our Lives" | Arabic; French; English | Ahmed Chawki | RedOne |
| 2014 | Brazil | ESPN; ABC | "ESPN Soccer Theme" | Instrumental | Joel Stevenett | Lisle Moore; Judd Maher |
| 2014 | Brazil | ITV | "Brazil" | Portuguese | Thiago Thomé | |
| 2014 | Brazil | NHK | "NIPPON" | Japanese | Ringo Sheena | Ringo Sheena |
| 2014 | Brazil | Univision | "Adrenalina" | Spanish | Wisin, Ricky Martin and Jennifer Lopez | Juan Luis Morera, José Torres and Carlos E. Ortiz |
| 2014 | Brazil | ZDF | "Love Runs Out" | English | OneRepublic | Ryan Tedder, Brent Kutzle, Drew Brown, Zach Filkins, Eddie Fisher |
| 2018 | Russia | Global | "Living Football" | None (Instrumental) | Hans Zimmer & Lorne Balfe | |
| 2018 | Russia | ARD | "Zusammen" | German | Die Fantastischen Vier featuring Clueso | Andreas Rieke, Michael B. Schmidt, Thomas Dürr, Michael DJ Beck, Thomas Burchia, Samy Sorge, Michael Kurth, Conrad Hensel, Florian Renner, Ricco Schoenebeck, Toni Oliver Schoenebeck; DJ Thomilla, Conrad Hensel, Hitnapperz |
| 2018 | Russia | BBC | "Ochi Chernye (Dark Eyes)" | Instrumental | Sigala | Florian Hermann |
| 2018 | Russia | beIN Sports | "One World" | English | RedOne, Adelina and Now United | RedOne |
| 2018 | Russia | Fox Sports | “Where Angels Fear to Tread” | Instrumental | Kirill Richter | |
| 2018 | Russia | Fox Sports | "FOX Sports FIFA World Cup Theme" | Instrumental | Pete Calandra | Pete Calandra |
| 2018 | Russia | ITV | "Swan Lake" | Instrumental | Julius Reisinger | Pyotr Ilyich Tchaikovsky |
| 2018 | Russia | NHK | "VOLT-AGE" | Japanese; English | Suchmos | YONCE, Suchmos |
| 2018 | Russia | Telemundo | "Positivo" | Spanish | J Balvin | Michael Brun |
| 2018 | Russia | Telemundo | "Sueño de Campeones" | Instrumental w/ Spanish Choir | Yoav Goren | Yoav Goren |
| 2018 | Russia | ZDF | "The Bravest" | English | Sir Rosevelt | Ben Simonetti, Niko Moon, Zac Brown, Grant Michaels, Sam Hollander |
| 2018 | Russia | NOS | "Coming Home" | English | Sheppard | Matt Radd, Chris Wallace, George Sheppard, Amy Sheppard, Jason Bovino |
| 2022 | Qatar | Global | "The Official FIFA World Cup Qatar 2022™ Theme" | Arabic; English (Instrumental) | Zachary Aaron Golden | |
| 2022 | Qatar | Abema/TV Asahi | "Isseino Kassai" | Japanese | LiSA | Halle/Haneru Takeuch, (Note: Credited in Japanese as 竹内羽瑠) LiSA |
| 2022 | Qatar | ARD | "One" | English | U2 | Bono, Daniel Lanois, Brian Eno |
| 2022 | Qatar | Azteca | Ulayeh | Spanish; Arabic | Sebastián Yatra | RedOne, Sebastián Yatra, Nouamane Belaiachi, Hector Caleb Lopez, Manuel Lorente Freire |
| 2022 | Qatar | BBC | Untitled | English | | Callum Rankine |
| 2022 | Qatar | CTV; TSN | "Come Together" | English | Crown Lands | Cody Bowles, Justin Meli, Jill Zimmerman, João Carvalho; Lennon–McCartney |
| 2022 | Qatar | FOX Sports | "FOX Sports FIFA World Cup Theme" | Instrumental | Pete Calandra | Pete Calandra |
| 2022 | Qatar | FOX Sports | "Olé" | English; Spanish | ENISA | Enisa Nikovic, Carmen Reece, G'harah Degeddingseze |
| 2022 | Qatar | Fuji TV | "Jump" | Japanese | Lilas Ikuta | Lilas Ikuta |
| 2022 | Qatar | ITV | "Around the World in 80 Days Main Theme" | Instrumental | City of Prague Philharmonic Orchestra | Victor Young |
| 2022 | Qatar | NHK | "Stardom" | Japanese | King Gnu | King Gnu |
| 2022 | Qatar | RTVE | "Toke" | Spanish | Chanel | Kyle Hanagami, Leroy Sanchez, Chanel Terrero, Miguel Muñoz, Alexa Zabala, Giovanny Fernández, Christopher Lightbody, Robert Steinmiller, Spencer Yaras |
| 2022 | Qatar | Telemundo | "Aeropuerto" | Spanish | Camilo | Edgar Barrera, Camilo Echeverry |
| 2022 | Qatar | Telemundo | "Sueño de Campeones" | Spanish | Yoav Goren | Yoav Goren |
| 2022 | Qatar | Televen | "Vamos al Mundial" | Spanish | Juan Miguel, Victor Muñoz, Luis Leal | |
| 2022 | Qatar | TUDN | "Vamos a Qatar" | Spanish | Los Bukis | Marco Antonio Solís |
| 2022 | Qatar | ZDF | "Dance All Over Me" | English | George Ezra | George Ezra, Joel Pott |
| 2022 | Qatar | NOS | "This Is The Moment" | English | Son Mieux | Isa Azier, Camiel Meiresonne, Quinten Meiresonne |
| 2026 | Canada; Mexico; United States | Global | "The Official FIFA World Cup 26™ Theme" | English (Instrumental) | Zachary Aaron Golden | |
| 2026 | Canada; Mexico; United States | BBC | "Somewhere Else" | Instrumental | Tomora | Tom Rowlands, Aurora |
| 2026 | Canada; Mexico; United States | CTV; TSN | "Victory" | Instrumental | Two Steps from Hell and Thomas Bergersen | |
| 2026 | Canada; Mexico; United States | DAZN Japan | "1000%" | Japanese | Orange Range | Orange Range, Satori Shiraishi |
| 2026 | Canada; Mexico; United States | FOX Sports | "FOX Sports FIFA World Cup Theme" | Instrumental | Pete Calandra | Pete Calandra |
| 2026 | Canada; Mexico; United States | Fuji TV | "Climax" | Japanese | Super Beaver | Super Beaver, Kei Kawano |
| 2026 | Canada; Mexico; United States | ITV/STV | "Life is a Highway" | English | Rascal Flatts | Tom Cochrane |
| 2026 | Canada; Mexico; United States | JTBC | "Watch it, Feel it" | Korean and English | DYNAMICDUO (Feat. WOODZ) | |
| 2026 | Canada; Mexico; United States | MagentaTV | "Heute Nacht" | German | Helene Fischer | Lukas Loules, Jens Schneider, Jules Kalmbacher |
| 2026 | Canada; Mexico; United States | NHK | "Karasu/Crow" | Japanese | Kenshi Yonezu | TBA |
| 2026 | Canada; Mexico; United States | NOS | "In the Stars" (Cirkut and Andrew Watt remix) | English | The Rolling Stones | Mick Jagger, Keith Richards |
| 2026 | Canada; Mexico; United States | NOS | "Just the Way You Are" | English | Milky | Giordano Trivellato, Giuliano Sacchetto, Paul McCartney, Linda McCartney, Grant McLennan, Robert Forester |
| 2026 | Canada; Mexico; United States | NTV | "完全無欠 (Kanzen Muketsu)" | Japanese and English | B´z | Koshi Inaba, Tak Matsumoto |
| 2026 | Canada; Mexico; United States | Telemundo | "Dai Dai" | Spanish (Note: Also includes a phrase each in French, Italian and Japanese.) | Shakira and Burna Boy | Shakira Mebarak, Alexander Castillo Vasquez, Ahmed Saghir, Ed Sheeran and Jon Bellion |
| 2026 | Canada; Mexico; United States | Telemundo | "Somos Más" | Spanish | Carlos Vives, Emilia Mernes, Wisin, and Xavi | Carlos Vives, Telemundo, Juan Luis Morera Luna, Julio Reyes, Ricardo Torres |
| 2026 | Canada; Mexico; United States | Telemundo | "Sueño de Campeones" | Spanish | Yoav Goren | Yoav Goren |
| 2026 | Canada; Mexico; United States | TVRI | "Bola Gembira" | Indonesian | Geor Octavins | Iman Brotoseno, Doni Irawan, Barno Tiar |
| 2026 | Canada; Mexico; United States | TVRI | "Satu Bola Sejuta Mimpi" | Indonesian | Dion Putra Ryan | Zainul Muttaqin, Hendar Dimas Anggara, Barno Tiar |
| 2026 | Canada; Mexico; United States | ZDF | "Kurz für immer" | German | Wincent Weiss | Wincent Weiss, Björn Olson, Joe Walter, Philipp Klemz |
| 2030 | Morocco; Portugal; Spain | TBD | TBD | TBD | TBD | TBD |
| 2034 | Saudi Arabia | TBD | TBD | TBD | TBD | TBD |

== Entrance/Pre-Match Protocol music ==
| Edition | Host country | Music | Notes |
|---|---|---|---|
| 1994 | United States | "FIFA Anthem" | |
| 1998 | France | "FIFA Anthem" | |
| 2002 | South Korea; Japan | "2002 FIFA World Cup Anthem" | |
| 2006 | Germany | "FIFA Anthem" | |
| 2010 | South Africa | "FIFA Anthem" | |
| 2014 | Brazil | "FIFA Anthem" | |
| 2018 | Russia | "Living Football" | When both teams' national flags and FIFA flag enter the pitch |
| 2018 | Russia | "Seven Nation Army (Instrumental)" | When players and officials enter the pitch |
| 2022 | Qatar | "It's Time-Pierre Caillot" "Qatar 2022 Concept K (Opening Flags)" | When both teams' national flags enter the pitch |
| 2022 | Qatar | "Arhbo (FIFA Walkout Anthem)" | When players and officials enter the pitch |
| 2022 | Qatar | "The Business" | Between the end of national anthems and kickoff |
| 2026 | Canada; Mexico; United States | "Desire" | When both teams' national flags and FIFA flag enter the pitch |
| 2026 | Canada; Mexico; United States | "Lose Yourself" (Instrumental) "Sirius" – Group Stage Matchday 1 and United States matches "Dai Dai (FIFA Walkout Anthem)" – All other matches | When players and officials enter the pitch |
| 2026 | Canada; Mexico; United States | "DNA (More Than a Game) x Dai Dai" – Group Stage Matchday 1 and United States matches "DNA (More Than a Game)" + "Titanium (David Guetta and Morten Remix)" – All other matches | Between the end of national anthems and kickoff |
| 2030 | Morocco; Portugal; Spain | TBD | TBD |
| 2034 | Saudi Arabia | TBD | TBD |

== See also ==
- List of FIFA Women's World Cup songs and anthems
- List of UEFA European Championship songs and anthems
- List of Copa América songs and anthems
- List of Africa Cup of Nations songs and anthems
- List of AFC Asian Cup songs and anthems
- List of songs dedicated to association football
- List of Olympic songs and anthems
