= Gloryland =

Gloryland may refer to:

== Albums ==
- Gloryland World Cup USA 94, an album by FIFA containing various songs for the 1994 FIFA World Cup
- Gloryland (Raymond Cilliers album)
- Gloryland, an album by the a capella band Anonymous 4

== Songs ==
- "Gloryland", a song by Daryl Hall and Sounds of Blackness, served as an official song of the 1994 FIFA World Cup held in the United States
- "Gloryland", a Blackhawk song from their album Spirit Dancer, also recorded by the band along with Keni Thomas
- "Gloryland", a song by Carbon Leaf on their album 5 Alive!
- "Gloryland", a song by Blue Tears on their album The Innocent Ones
- "Gloryland", a hymn by Sankey, appearing on the Waterson:Carthy album Holy Heathens and the Old Green Man
- "Gloryland", a song by Willie Nile from his 2014 album If I Was a River
- "Gloryland", a song by Audio Adrenaline from their 1996 album Bloom

== Others ==
- Gloryland, a 2009 novel by Shelton Johnson
