= Myriam Fares: The Journey =

- Directed by: Sherif Tarhini; Myriam Fares
- Written by: Myriam Fares
- Produced by: Myriam Music
- Starring: Myriam Fares
- Distributed by: Netflix
- Release date: June 3, 2021
- Country: Lebanon

Myriam Fares: The Journey is a 2021 documentary film that follows Lebanese singer and actress Myriam Fares during the 2020 COVID-19 lockdown. The film documents her pregnancy with her second child, sixth studio album preparations and struggles during quarantine. It was directed by Sherif Tarhini, produced by Myriam Music, and released to Netflix on June 3, 2021.

The documentary was met with mixed critical reception. Following the film's release, "Ghaddara Ya Dounya", a song by Fares featured at the end of the documentary, was released as the lead single from her album.

== Synopsis ==
The official synopsis as released by Netflix, "From pregnancy to album preparations, Lebanese singer and "Queen of the Stage" Myriam Fares documents her experiences with her family while in lockdown."

== Cast ==
- Myriam Fares

== Release and promotion ==
The documentary follows the singer's pregnancy during lockdown, and the preparations for her next album. She reveals that every now and then she will release a song from the album with its music video. Fares became the very first Arab artist to have their own documentary on Netflix. Following its release, it became the most searched film on the platform, and more than a year later, the film has re-entered the top searched films on Netflix.

To promote the film, Fares spoke about it during her interview with Turkish magazine Pop & Kultur.
