= FIFA World Cup Qatar 2022 Official Soundtrack =

Compilation album by various artists
- Released: 9 December 2022
- Recorded: 2022
- Studio: FIFA Sound
- Length: 29 minutes
- Label: FIFA Sound (Universal Arabic/Republic)
- Producer: RedOne, Wassim Slaiby, Roland Orzabal, Ian Stanley

FIFA World Cup chronology
One Love, One Rhythm (2014)	FIFA World Cup Qatar 2022 Official Soundtrack (2022)	FIFA World Cup 2026 Official Album (2026)

Singles from FIFA World Cup Qatar 2022 Official Soundtrack
- 1. "Hayya Hayya (Better Together)" Released: 1 April 2022; 2. "Arhbo" Released: 19 August 2022; 3. "The World Is Yours To Take" Released: 23 September 2022; 4. "Light The Sky" Released: 7 October 2022; 5. "Tukoh Taka" Released: 17 November 2022; 6. "Dreamers" Released: 20 November 2022

FIFA World Cup Qatar 2022 Official Soundtrack is a compilation album with various artists released in 2022. This album is the official music album of the 2022 FIFA World Cup held in Qatar.

== History ==
For the first time since 2014, a multi-song FIFA World Cup official soundtrack was released, instead of one official song which was the case in 2018. The first single of the album is "Hayya Hayya (Better Together)", performed by Trinidad Cardona, Davido and AISHA, released on 1 April 2022 along with the music video. The second single is "Arhbo", performed by Gims and Ozuna, released on 19 August 2022 along with the music video.

The third single is "The World Is Yours to Take" performed by American rapper Lil Baby, teamed up with Budweiser, released on 23 September 2022 along with the music video. The fourth single is "Light The Sky" performed by Nora Fatehi, Manal, Rahma Riad and Balqees, composed by RedOne and released on 7 October 2022 along with the music video.

The fifth single, "Tukoh Taka", performed by Nicki Minaj, Maluma and Myriam Fares, was released on 17 November 2022 along with the music video, serving as the official song of the FIFA Fan Festival. The final single is "Dreamers" by Jungkook of BTS released on 20 November 2022. It was performed with Fahad Al-Kubaisi during the tournament's opening ceremony.

== Track listing ==
No.	Title	Writer(s)	Performer(s)	Length
1.	"The Official FIFA World Cup Qatar 2022 Theme"	Zachary Aaron Golden		1:52
2.	"Tukoh Taka"	Wassim Slaiby	Nicki Minaj, Maluma and Myriam Fares	2:59
3.	"Hayya Hayya (Better Together)"	RedOne	Trinidad Cardona, Davido and AISHA	3:27
4.	"Arhbo"	RedOne	Ozuna and Gims	3:40
5.	"Light the Sky"	RedOne	Rahma, Balqees, Nora, Manal	4:19
6.	"Dreamers"	RedOne	Jungkook	3:22
7.	"Hayya Hayya (Better Together)" (Spanish Version)	RedOne	Trinidad Cardona, Davido and AISHA	3:27
8.	"Arhbo" (Arabic Version)	RedOne	Ayed, Nasser Al Kubaisi and Haneen Hussain	3:23
9.	"Dreamers" (Arabic Version)	RedOne	Jungkook and Fahad Al Kubaisi	3:59
10.	"The World Is Yours To Take"	Roland Orzabal, Ian Stanley	Lil Baby and Tears for Fears	2:48
11.	"Ezz Al Arab"	Tudor Monroe, Kareem Lotfy	Wegz	3:34

== See also ==
- List of FIFA World Cup songs and anthems
