= Raymond Cilliers =

South African Christian music singer

- Born: 1981 (age 44–45): Somerset West; Cape Town
- Occupations: Singer; songwriter; lecturer; pastor
- Years active: 1993-present
- Spouse: Charne Cilliers
- Children: 2
- Musical career
- Genres: Contemporary Christian music; gospel
- Instrument: Vocals
- Labels: Brettian Productions; Independent

Raymond Cilliers is a South African gospel and contemporary Christian recording artist. His career began in 1993 at age 11 with his debut album, Gloryland, which reached gold status in South Africa.

== Career ==
=== Music ===
Raymond Cilliers started out in 1993 in the South African Gospel Music scene on the label Brettian.

=== Education ===
Raymond received a bachelor's degree in Ministry from Heritage of Faith Bible Instituteand an Honorary bachelor's degree from CFCI Bible Institute. He also became a lecturer at both schools for a total of seven years.

=== Philanthropy ===
Raymond's ministry has taken him across South Africa, and to the USA.

== Personal life ==
Cilliers resides in Florida with his wife and two children.

== Discography ==
Raymond has released numerous studio, compilation and live albums.

=== Studio albums ===
- Gloryland (1994)
- Lord I Thank You (1997)
- Suddenly Light (1999)
- Sacred Path (2001)
- The Sound of the Secret Place (2003)
- Lately (2005)
- Coming Home (2007)
- Choose Life - CD & DVD (2008)
- Most Beautiful Name (July 27, 2017)

=== Live albums ===
- Muzik! Live Gospel featuring Imagine: Leon Ferreira, Mervis and Freddie Wessels - (2006)
- Emmaus Worship Experience (2008)

=== Compilation albums ===
- Die Begin Jare... It Is Well - Volume 2 (2009)
- Die Begin Jare... Shekinah Glory - Volume 4 (2009)
