= Aman (Myriam Fares album) =

Studio album by Myriam Fares
- Released: January 5, 2015
- Recorded: 2012
- Genres: Arabic music, EDM, Khaleji, Moroccan Music, Egyptian Music
- Length: 49:00

Myriam Fares chronology
Min Oyouni (2011)	Aman (2015)

Singles from Aman
- 1. "Kifak Enta" Released: May 21, 2013; 2. "Deggou El Toboul" Released: November 7, 2014; 3. "Nifsi Aoulhalak" Released: February 10, 2015; 4. "Aman" Released: May 16, 2015; 5. "Ghafi" Released: May 22, 2016

Aman (Arabic: آمان) is the fifth studio album by Lebanese singer Myriam Fares. It was released on January 5, 2015, by Myriam Music. The album combines elements of house and techno with traditional and Oriental music, with the title track "Aman" remaking an Andalusian song titled "Lamma Bada Yatathanna".

The sixth single "Nifsi Aoulhalak" was largely successful, and has been played at global night clubs outside of the Middle East. The album garnered positive reviews from critics across the Middle East.

== Background ==
Myriam's fourth album Min Oyouni was released in 2011, and it was her first full-length Khaliji album. Aman featured several Khaljji tracks including the second single "Ana Gheir". In the album, Myriam performed in Lebanese, Egyptian and Khaliji accents.

=== Singles and music video ===
The lead single, "Chou Bheb" a ballad song was released in February 2012 and was followed by "Ana Gheir" in December.

The third single "Halla Halla Ya Sabaya" was the opening theme for the TV show 'Sakan El Talebat' and was released in February 2013. The fourth single "Kifak Enta" was released in May 2013 alongside an official music video.

== Track listing ==
1. "Nifsi Aoul'halak"
2. "Deggou El Toboul"
3. "Bizemmetak"
4. "Kifak Enta"
5. "El Zeer"
6. "Chou Bheb"
7. "Gharrouk"
8. "Halla Halla Ya Sabaya"
9. "Sympatica"
10. "Ma Yani Noum"
11. "Ghafi"
12. "Ana Gheir (Teraggemni)"
13. "Aman"

== Charts ==
Chart (2016)	Peak position
Rotana Albums Top 100	12
