= Let's Get Together Now =

2002 song by Voice of Korea/Japan

Let's Get Together Now is the official "Korea/Japan" song of the 2002 FIFA World Cup held in South Korea and Japan. Performed by the Supergroup Voice of Korea/Japan (Lena Park and Brown Eyes from South Korea and Sowelu and Chemistry from Japan), it was released in three separate versions: a full Japanese version, a full Korean version (with some English at the end), and a merged version which combines the lyrics of the two versions. The last of the three was included in the official soundtrack album and was performed in the opening ceremonies in Seoul on May 31, 2002.

Composed by Daisuke Kawaguchi and Kim Hyung-Suk and written by Yoshimitsu Sawamoto, Kiyoshi Matsuo, Park, and Kim, the lyrics tell spirit of gathering and coming together as one, as with the theme of the two countries in co-hosting the said event. While Boom by Anastacia is the international official song, Let's Get Together Now is the official "Korea/Japan" song and proves to be popular.

The single was certified gold by the RIAJ in March 2002.

== See also ==
- List of FIFA World Cup songs and anthems
- The Official Album of the 2002 FIFA World Cup
