= The Official Album of the 2002 FIFA World Cup =

2002 compilation album

Compilation album by Various artists
- Released: May 2, 2002
- Label: Sony Music Entertainment Japan

Various artists chronology
Music of the World Cup: Allez! Ola! Ole! (1998)	The Official Album of the 2002 FIFA World Cup (2002)	Voices from the FIFA World Cup (2006)

Singles from The Official Album
- 1. "Boom" Released: 20 March 2002; 2. "We're on the Ball" Released: 9 May 2002; 3. "Anthem (The 2002 FIFA World Cup Official Anthem)" Released: 15 June 2002

Alternative cover
- Fever Pitch: The Official Music of The 2002 FIFA World Cup

The Official Album of the 2002 FIFA World Cup is a compilation album with various artists, released in 2002 by Sony Music Entertainment Japan. It is the official music album of the 2002 FIFA World Cup in South Korea and Japan. The album spawned the single "We're on the Ball" by Ant & Dec. The album was also released under the name Fever Pitch: The Official Music of The 2002 FIFA World Cup, but without "We're on the Ball".

== Track listing ==
The following is the track listing from Fever Pitch: The Official Album of the 2002 FIFA World Cup, which differs from the standard version only in the omission of "We're on the Ball" as track 2.

No.	Title	Writer(s)	Artist(s)	Length
1.	"Boom" (The Official 2002 FIFA World Cup Song)	Anastacia, Glen Ballard	Anastacia	3:18
2.	"Live For Love United" (France; World)		Peabo Bryson
3.	"(Crack It) Something Going On" (Finland)		Bomfunk MC's, ft. Jessica Folcker
4.	"Let's Get Loud" (United States)	Gloria Estefan, Kike Santander	Jennifer Lopez
5.	"Sunrise" (Denmark)		Safri Duo Meets Ayla
6.	"World At Your Feet" (Belgium)		Lara Fabian
7.	"Let It Out" (England)		a1
8.	"Party" (Portugal)		Nelly Furtado
9.	"True East Side" (South Korea)		g.o.d, ft. J.Y. Park	3:56
10.	"We Will Be Heroes" (Germany)		Die Toten Hosen
11.	"Anthem" (JS Radio Edit, The Official 2002 FIFA World Cup Anthem)	Vangelis	Vangelis
12.	"Fever" (Italy)		Elisa
13.	"Bringing the World Back Home" (Mexico)		OV7
14.	"BLZ" (Japan)		Mondo Grosso
15.	"Shake the House" (Spain)		Mónica Naranjo
16.	"Vittoria" (England)		Opera Babes
17.	"Brave, Strong & True" (South Africa)		Bongo Maffin
18.	"World of Make Believe" (United States; Latin America)		Chayanne
19.	"Gol" (Brazil)		Communion, ft. Carlinhos Brown
20.	"Anthem" (Orchestral version with choral introduction, The Official 2002 FIFA World Cup Song)		Vangelis
21.	"Work of Heaven" (Indonesia; Southeast Asia)		Padi

== Singles ==
International CD Single
(SINCD8; Released 13 April 2002)

1. "Live for Love United" – 5:08

== Charts ==
Chart (2002)	Peak position
German Compilation Albums (Offizielle Top 100)	21

== Korean/Japanese edition ==
2002 FIFA World Cup Official Album Songs of Korea/Japan

Compilation album by Various artists
- Released: May 29, 2002
- Genre: J-pop, K-pop
- Label: SME Records

Various artists chronology
Music of the World Cup: Allez! Ola! Ole! (1998)	2002 FIFA World Cup Official Album Songs of Korea/Japan (2002)	Voices from the FIFA World Cup (2006)

Singles from 2002 FIFA World Cup Official Album Songs of Korea/Japan
- 1. "Let's Get Together Now" Released: 22 May 2002

2002 FIFA World Cup Official Album Songs of Korea/Japan is an edition featuring Korean and Japanese musicians called Songs of Korea/Japan was also released, which was a commercial success in Japan. It was certified platinum for 200,000 copies shipped to stores by the RIAJ.

=== Track listing ===
Disc 1

1. Anthem (Takkyu Ishino remix) - Vangelis
2. Let's Get Together Now - Voices of KOREA/JAPAN
3. Devil - B'z
4. Always - Mai kuraki
5. Escort - Gospellers
6. One Love Wonderful World - Ken Hirai
7. I'll be - Mr.Children
8. I will follow - TUBE
9. Go Steady Go! - Porno Graffitti
10. Fantasista - Dragon Ash
11. United Soul (World Mix) - T-Square

Disc 2

1. Last Song - Asian H
2. The Player's Creed - Kim Jo-han
3. Ready - Park Jin-young
4. Gotta Get Love - J
5. Friend - Lee Ki-chan
6. Glorious - Lena Park
7. Dream - Hwayobi
8. Burning - Jein

== See also ==
- List of FIFA World Cup songs and anthems
