= Goumi (song) =

2018 single by Myriam Fares

Single by Myriam Fares
- Language: Arabic
- Genre: Khaliji pop
- Length: 2:58
- Label: Myriam Music
- Songwriter: Yousef Alomani
- Producer: Hussam El Dine

Myriam Fares singles chronology
"Chouf Halak Aalayi" (2017)	"Goumi" (2018)	"Habibi Saudi" (2019)

"Goumi" (Arabic: قومي, lit. 'stand up') is a song recorded by Lebanese singer Myriam Fares. It was released as a single on December 12, 2018. The song was written by Yousef Alomani and produced by Hussam El Dine. It is sung by Fares in the Iraqi dialect.

A R3hab / Mdlbeast remix version of the song was released on June 1, 2023.

== Background and release ==
The song was announced by the singer herself on December 2, 2018, via her social media accounts. It was released after her six months hiatus and after her recovery, she decided to comeback with "Goumi" because it has a positive message. Fares revealed that before releasing the song "[she] was scared, [she] cried, [she] was falling apart" but the support of her fans brought her all the positivity in the world and "[she] stood up again". After 4 years of its release, "Goumi" became a viral sensation after a dance challenge created by Myriam was launched on Instagram. Although she didn't have a TikTok account at that time, the challenge went viral on TikTok and gained over 8.4 billion total views.

== Music video ==
The jungle-themed music video was released alongside the song and it was directed by Sherif Tarhini. It features Myriam wearing African-themed costumes as well as African choreography. In 2022, the singer received backlash and the music video went viral after the release of her official FIFA anthem single "Tukoh Taka" and was accused of racism because in one of the scenes, her entire body was painted a significantly darker shade. At the end of the video Myriam could be seen with a blackface posing with other models that are authentically black. In March 2023, it was revealed that YouTube allowed Myriam's team's request to remove the controversial part from the music video.

== Charts ==
Chart performance for "Goumi"
Chart (2018)	Peak position
Lebanon (The Official Lebanese Top 20)	2
