= Hayya Hayya (Better Together) =

Single by Trinidad Cardona, Davido and AISHA

from the album FIFA World Cup Qatar 2022 Official Soundtrack
- Language: English
- Released: April 1, 2022
- Genre: Afrobeat; reggae; R&B
- Length: 3:27
- Label: Universal Music
- Composers: David Adeleke; Steph; Nadir Khayat; Pat Devine; Mehdi Bouamer; Adil Khayat
- Lyricists: Trinidad Cardona; David Adeleke; Nadir Khayat
- Producer: RedOne

Trinidad Cardona singles chronology
"Even If" (Remix) (2022)	"Hayya Hayya (Better Together)" (2022)	"Love Me Back (Fayahh Beat)" (2022)

Davido singles chronology
"Champion Sound" (2021)	"Hayya Hayya (Better Together)" (2022)	"Dada" (Remix) (2022)

AISHA singles chronology
"Hayya Hayya (Better Together)" (2022)

Music video
- "Hayya Hayya (Better Together)" on YouTube

"Hayya Hayya (Better Together)" is a song by American singer Trinidad Cardona, Nigerian singer Davido and Qatari singer AISHA. It is the first single of the multi-song 2022 FIFA World Cup official soundtrack. The track was produced by RedOne and was released on April 1, 2022. The title contains the Arabic word hayyā (هيا), an interjection meaning "let's go!"

== Music video ==
The music video for the song was released on April 1, 2022. It features Trinidad Cardona, Davido, AISHA and RedOne.

== Critical reception ==
The song received mixed reviews. Chris Wright of ESPN considered it a slight improvement from "Live It Up" but still criticizing its lack of musical and lyrical ties to Qatar or to football. Maya Georgi of Rolling Stone retrospectively ranked "Hayya Hayya (Better Together)" as one of the best World Cup songs, praising its "cross-cultural element inherent in World Cup music".

== Credits and personnel ==
- Trinidad Cardona – lyrics, composition, vocals
- Davido – lyrics, composition, vocals
- AISHA (Aisha Aziani) – vocals
- RedOne – lyrics, composition, production, arrangement, background vocals

== Charts ==
Chart performance for "Hayya Hayya (Better Together)"
Chart (2022)	Peak position
Croatia (HRT)	48
Suriname (Nationale Top 40)	1

== See also ==
- List of FIFA World Cup songs and anthems
