= Sacred Path =

Studio album by Raymond Cilliers
- Released: 2001
- Recorded: 2000–2001
- Venue: South Africa
- Genres: CCM; gospel
- Language: English
- Label: Brettian Productions

Raymond Cilliers chronology
Suddenly Light (1999)	Sacred Path (2001)	The Sound Of a Secret place (2003)

Sacred Path is a studio album released in 2001 by the contemporary Christian and gospel singer Raymond Cilliers.

== Track listing ==
1. Loving You
2. I know You
3. O Sacret King
4. Reaching For You
5. Your Majesty
6. Honour and praise
7. Lost in your Glory
8. We place in Your wings of Worship
9. I Simply live For You
10. Clothe Me in White
11. Your Majesty (Spanish Version)
12. Hungry for You
