= Argentine Melody (Cancion de Argentina) =

Single by San Jose featuring Rodriguez Argentina (Rod Argent)
- Released: June 1978
- Recorded: 1978
- Label: MCA
- Songwriter: Andrew Lloyd Webber
- Producer: Andrew Lloyd Webber

"Argentine Melody (Cancion de Argentina)" is an instrumental tune composed by Andrew Lloyd Webber as the BBC theme music for the 1978 FIFA World Cup held in Argentina that same year.

== Reception ==
Released as a single in the United Kingdom in June 1978, this instrumental piece peaked at position #14 on the UK Singles Chart. It was performed by San Jose featuring Rodriguez Argentina (a.k.a. Rod Argent), who would also go on to perform "Aztec Gold", the ITV theme for the 1986 FIFA World Cup in Mexico; the group included Don Airey of Deep Purple and the trio appeared on Top of the Pops twice, in June and July 1978, which marked Lloyd Webber's only appearances on the show as a performer.

== Chart history ==
Chart (1978)	Peak position
UK Singles Chart	14

== See also ==
- FIFA World Cup official songs
