= Dinero (Trinidad Cardona song) =

- Main 2018 reissue cover; original cover has Cardona wearing sunglasses

Single by Trinidad Cardona
- Language: English; Spanish; Portuguese
- Released: June 21, 2017
- Length: 2:40
- Label: Island
- Songwriters: Trinidad Cardona; Dernst Emile II; Willie Darnell Brooks
- Producers: D'Mile; Willstrumentals

Trinidad Cardona singles chronology
"Summer Love" (2017)	"Dinero" (2017)	"Jennifer" (2017)

Music video
- "Dinero" on YouTube

"Dinero" is a song by American singer Trinidad Cardona, originally released on June 21, 2017, by Citi U.S., before being edited and reissued on February 2, 2018, by Island Records. It was produced by D'Mile and Willstrumentals. The song did not gain significant attention until 2021, when it went viral on video sharing app TikTok, subsequently charting across Europe.

== Background ==
Cardona initially recorded several songs in 2017, including "Dinero" and the viral hit "Jennifer", before he was signed to Island Records. After his first two albums failed to gain any substantial success, Island dropped Cardona in 2018, after which he began working odd jobs while "remaining hopeful about his music career". While working as a food delivery driver in early 2021, Cardona wrote down on a vision board that he wanted to go viral on TikTok: "Don't know how, don't know what. And boom, manifestations." Two months later, his family alerted him that "Dinero" was going viral on TikTok, appearing in several dance challenges. Cardona later re-signed with Island based on the success of the track.

== Charts ==
=== Weekly charts ===
Weekly chart performance for "Dinero"
Chart (2021)	Peak position
Austria (Ö3 Austria Top 40)	18
Belgium (Ultratop 50 Flanders)	39
Belgium (Ultratop 50 Wallonia)	26
Canada (Canadian Hot 100)	40
Denmark (Tracklisten)	32
France (SNEP)	25
Germany (GfK)	23
Global 200 (Billboard)	46
Greece (IFPI)	14
Hungary (Stream Top 40)	24
Ireland (IRMA)	62
Lithuania (AGATA)	39
Netherlands (Single Top 100)	21
Poland Airplay (ZPAV)	48
Portugal (AFP)	11
Sweden (Sverigetopplistan)	67
Switzerland (Schweizer Hitparade)	11
UK Singles (OCC)	50
US Bubbling Under Hot 100 (Billboard)	18
US Rhythmic (Billboard)	37

=== Year-end charts ===
Year-end chart performance for "Dinero"
Chart (2021)	Position
France (SNEP)	150
Portugal (AFP)	122
Switzerland (Schweizer Hitparade)	95

== Certifications ==
Certifications and sales for "Dinero"
Region	Certification	Certified units/sales
Brazil (Pro-Música Brasil)	2× Platinum	120,000^{‡}
France (SNEP)	Platinum	200,000^{‡}
New Zealand (RMNZ)	Gold	15,000^{‡}
Poland (ZPAV)	Gold	25,000^{‡}
Portugal (AFP)	Gold	5,000^{‡}
United Kingdom (BPI)	Silver	200,000^{‡}
United States (RIAA)	Gold	500,000^{‡}
^{‡} Sales+streaming figures based on certification alone.
