= Anthem (FIFA World Cup) =

Single by Vangelis
- Released: June 2002
- Genre: Theme music, trance
- Songwriter: Vangelis
- Producer: Takkyu Ishino

"Anthem" by Vangelis is the theme music for 2002 FIFA World Cup held in South Korea and Japan and served as the official anthem of the 2002 FIFA World Cup.

The single was commercially successful in Japan, being certified platinum for sales of over 100,000 copies. The single reached number 98 on the UK Singles Chart. It received the Song of the Year award by the Recording Industry Association of Japan.

The versions were included in the official soundtrack Fever Pitch and The Official Album of the 2002 FIFA World Cup. The single also included for 2002 FIFA World Cup TV opening and entrance music.

== Track listing ==
1. "Anthem – 2002 FIFA World Cup Official Anthem" (orchestra version with choral introduction) – 4:31
2. "Anthem – 2002 FIFA World Cup Official Anthem" (synthesizer version) – 3:30
3. "Anthem – JS 16 Radio Edit – 2002 FIFA World Cup Official Anthem" (radio edit) – 3:44
4. "Anthem – Takkyu Ishino Remix Radio Edit – 2002 Fifa World Cup Official Anthem" (radio edit) – 3:36

== Certification ==
Region	Certification	Certified units/sales
Japan (RIAJ)	Platinum	100,000^{^}
^{*} Sales figures based on certification alone.^{^} Shipments figures based on certification alone.^{‡} Sales+streaming figures based on certification alone.

== See also ==
- List of FIFA World Cup songs and anthems
