= Time of Our Lives (Chawki song) =

2014 single by Ahmed Chawki

Single by Chawki
- Released: 6 June 2014
- Recorded: 2014
- Genre: Eurodance
- Length: 3:44
- Label: RedOne Records
- Songwriters: Nadir Khayat; Chawki; Aziz Mahfoud; Mohamed el Mrabet; Travon Potts
- Producer: RedOne

Chawki singles chronology
"Magic in the Air" (2014)	"Time of Our Lives" (2014)	"It's My Life (Don't Worry)" (2014)

Music video
- "Time of Our Lives" on YouTube

"Time of Our Lives" is a 2014 single by Moroccan singer Chawki released in time with the launch of the 2014 FIFA World Cup. An Arabic language version retitled "Farhat al 'Aalam" (in Arabic فرحة العالم) was also released for the Arab world. It was produced by RedOne and released on RedOne Records.

== Background ==
The various language song was released in partnership with beIN Sports, the football (soccer) themed song came almost simultaneously with the immense commercial success of "Magic in the Air" by the Ivorian band Magic System, which featured Chawki.

The song "Time of Our Lives" is in English language but as the release was targeted mainly for the French-speaking markets where Chawki had already had a previous hit with "Habibi I Love You", the song presented a bilingual refrain: "Allez, Allez, here we go, allez / This is the time of our lives) allez being French for "come on" used throughout the song.

A football and Brazilian Capoeira-themed outdoor partying video was also promoted in time for the opening of the 2014 World Cup.

The song found commercial success reaching number 15 in SNEP the official French official Singles Chart and went on high rotation on French commercial radio giving Chawki two simultaneous hit singles in France's Top 20, "Time of Our Lives" alongside "Magic in the Air" that reached number 3 in French main chart and number 1 in French Club 40 dance chart.

=== Language versions ===
A more extensively French language version was offered under the title "Time of Our Lives (Notre Moment)".

An Arabic language version of the song destined for Arab markets was retitled "Farhat al 'Aalam" (in Arabic فرحة العالم meaning the joy of the world), actually a trilingual version in Arabic (main lyrics) and English and French (refrains).

== Charts ==
Chart (2014)	Peak position
Belgium (Ultratip Bubbling Under Wallonia)	13
France (SNEP)	15
