= Vegedream =

French singer-songwriter (born 1992)

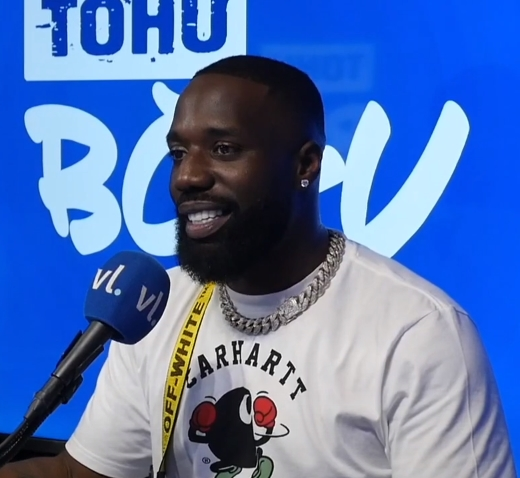
- Vegedream in 2021

Background information
- Also known as: Vegedream
- Born: Satchela Evrard Djedje; 25 August 1992 (age 34); Orléans, France
- Genres: Hip hop; R&B; urban pop
- Years active: 2017–present

Satchela Evrard Djedje (born 25 August 1992 in Orléans), better known by the artistic name Vegedream, is a French hip hop, R&B and urban pop singer-songwriter of Ivorian origin. He is signed to Universal Music France and is best known for his 2018 hit single "Ramenez la coupe à la maison" (Bring the cup back home) that topped the French SNEP Singles Chart, and was the France national football team's unofficial song for the 2018 FIFA World Cup. He released his debut studio album Marchand de sable (Sandman) in 2018. Since his breakthrough, he has released three studio albums, all of which reached the top 10 in the French Album Charts, as well as 23 singles, several of which also charted.

On June 12, 2026, Vegedream and Canadian singer and Bollywood actress Nora Fatehi performed "Siir Siir," an official 2026 World Cup song, at the second opening ceremony of the 2026 FIFA World Cup in Toronto, Canada.

== Personal life ==
Vegedream's father, as well as his uncle Ziké (also a musician), are from Gagnoa in the Ivory Coast, so in each song, he says (Et) ça c'est Vegedream de Gagnoa, meaning "(And) This is Vegedream from Gagnoa", which he got when he visited Gagnoa as a child. He is therefore also named "Vegedream de Gagnoa", as well as "Vege" and "Vegeta".

== Discography ==
=== Studio albums ===
Year	Album	Peak positions				
Year	Album	FRA	BEL (Wa)	DEN	NLD	SWI
2018	Marchand de sable	5	29	38	24	—
2019	Ategban	9	29	—	—	45
2022	La boîte de Pandore	7	149	—	—	—

=== Singles ===
Year	Title	Peak positions				Certifications	Album
Year	Title	FRA	BEL (Wa)	SWI	UK	Certifications	Album
2017	"Obscure"	161	—	—	—		Marchand de sable
2018	"La fuite" (with DJ Leska)	50	—	—	—		Marchand de sable
2018	"La rue"	109	—	—	—		Marchand de sable
2018	"Du temps"	136	—	—	—		Marchand de sable
2018	"Ramenez la coupe à la maison"	1	27	3	60	BPI: Silver	Marchand de sable
2018	"Jusqu'ici tout va bien" (with Sofiane)	114	—	—	—		93 Empire
2018	"C'est mon année"	70	—	—	—		Marchand de sable 2
2019	"Ma Go Sure"	77	—	—	—		Marchand de sable 2
2019	"Instagram" (featuring Joé Dwèt Filé)	45	—	—	—		Ategban
2019	"Calimero" (featuring Dadju)	136	—	—	—		Ategban
2019	"Elle est bonne sa mère" (featuring Ninho)	2	43	100	—		Ategban
2019	"Ibiza" (featuring Jessica Aire and Anilson & Viélo)	—	—	—	—		Ategban
2019	"La cité"	—	—	—	—		Game Over Volume 2
2019	"Mes doutes"	—	—	—	—		Ategban (Deluxe)
2020	"Daishi"	—	—	—	—		
2020	"Juste une fois"	169	—	—	—		
2020	"Marchand de sable Part. 6 (Gestuelle)"	—	—	—	—		
2020	"Pour nous" (with Tayc)	47	—	—	—		
2021	"Touché dans le cœur"	91	—	—	—		
2021	"B.E.T.E" (with Nesly)	—	—	—	—		
2021	"Madame Djé (Djenaba)"	116	—	—	—		
2022	"On a l'habitu (Ok Many)" (featuring Naps)	94	—	—	—		
2022	"Merci les bleus"	30	—	—	—		
2026	"Tu m'as Menti"	91	—	—	—		

=== Featured singles ===
- "Un bail" (Neraah featuring Vegedream, 2017)
- "C'est la loi" (Naza featuring Vegedream, 2018)
- "Puerto Rico" (Shy'm featuring Vegedream, 2019)
- "Sors de ma vie" (Zayra featuring Vegedream, 2019)
- "Shaku" (KTL featuring Vegedream, 2020)
- "Kodo" (Elams featuring Vegedream)
- "Antoinetta" (Tom Moutchi featuring Vegedream, 2022)

=== Other charted songs ===
Year	Title	Peak positions	Album
Year	Title	FRA	Album
2018	"Marchand de sable Part. 4 (Du saal)"	99	Marchand de sable
2018	"Laisser tomber"	170	Marchand de sable
2018	"Mama he"	64	Marchand de sable
2018	"Tout casser" (featuring H Magnum)	152	Marchand de sable
2018	"Princes de la ville" (Dosse featuring Vegedream)	91	Vidalossa
2018	"On y va"	173	Marchand de sable 2
2019	"Personne" (featuring Damso)	36	Ategban
