= Habibi I Love You =

2013 single by Chawki featuring Pitbull

Single by Ahmed Chawki featuring Pitbull
- Language: Arabic, English
- Released: 17 June 2013
- Recorded: 2013
- Genre: Pop
- Length: 3:40
- Label: Universal Music (distribution)
- Songwriters: Rachid Aziz (Rush), Ahmed Chawki, Adil Khayat, John Mamann, Mohamed Merdi, Armando Perez, RedOne
- Producers: RedOne (production); Trevor Muzzy (mixing)

Ahmed Chawki singles chronology
"Habibi I Love You" (2013)	"Magic in the Air" (2013)

Pitbull singles chronology
"Outta Nowhere" (2013)	"Habibi I Love You" (2013)	"Exotic" (2013)

Music video
- "Habibi I Love You" on YouTube

"Habibi I Love You" is a 2013 song by Ahmed Chawki featuring rapper Pitbull. The original song was bilingual in Arabic performed by Chawki in Arab dialect (rather than classical Arabic) and rap section in English performed by Pitbull. The single was produced by RedOne. The music video was filmed in Miami, Florida.

The song was also interpreted in additional languages like French, Spanish, and Dutch. It charted in France and the Netherlands.

== Music video ==
Filmed in Miami, Florida, music video shows Chawki performing his song on the beach and sometimes he is accompanied by Pitbull. In a concurrent storyline, Chawki is pursuing an unknown love interest, trying to attract her attention by appearing in various quick cloth changes, but despite his best efforts, she continues to ignore him. But eventually, the two meet in the backdrop of a sea resort where they are both residing. The last scene shows she is finally in his arms and both of them join Pitbull in the final refrain of the song. Non-Arabic music videos (except Greek and Dutch versions) marks the additional appearance of other singers in their respective languages alongside Pitbull (like Kenza Farah in French, Sophia del Carmen in Spanish and Mandinga in Romanian version).

== Track list ==
Track list – remixes

1. "Habibi I Love You" (Ahmed Chawki feat. Pitbull) [Radio Edit] (3:40)
2. "Habibi I Love You" (Ahmwed Chawki feat. Pitbull) [Tommy Rocks Club Radio Remix] (3:35)
3. "Habibi I Love You" (Ahmed Chawki feat. Pitbull) [Tommy Rocks Club Remix] (6:07)
4. "Habibi I Love You" (Ahmed feat. Pitbull) [DJ Idriss Radio Remix] (3:34)

Track list – remixes – single

1. "Habibi I Love You" (Radio Edit) [Ahmed Chawki feat. Pitbull] (3:40)
2. "Habibi I Love You" (Tommy Rocks Remix Radio Edit) [Amed Chawki feat. Pitbull] (3:35)
3. "Habibi I Love You" (DJ Idriss Radio Remix) [Ahmed Chawki feat. Pitbull] (3:34)

Track list – French version

1. "Habibi I Love You" (feat. Kenza Farah & Pitbull) [100 Hits été 2013] (3:31)

Track list – Spanish version

1. "Habibi I Love You" (feat. Pitbull) [Spanish Radio Edit] (3:40)
2. "Habibi I Love You" (feat. Pitbull) [Arabic Club Radio Edit] (3:35)
3. "Habibi I Love You" (feat. Pitbull) [Arabic Radio Edit] (3:40)

Track list – Spanish single

1. "Habibi I Love You" (Ahmed Chawki feat. Sophia del Carmen & Pitbull) (3:40)

Track list – Spanish EP

1. "Habibi I Love You" (feat. Sophia del Carmen & Pitbull) – Single – (3:40)
2. "Habibi I Love You (feat. Pitbull) [Arabic Radio Edit] (3:40)
3. "Habibi I Love You (feat. Pitbull) [Arabic Club Radio Edit] (3:35)
4. "Habibi I Love You (feat. Pitbull) [Spanish Radio Edit] (3:40)
5. "Habibi I Love You (feat. Pitbull) [Arabic Radio Edit] Mykonos (3:40)
6. "Habibi I Love You (feat. Pitbull) [Arabic Radio Edit] Crazy Beach (3:40)

Track list – Dutch single

1. "Habibi I Love You" (Chawki feat. Pitbull & Do) (3:40)

== Versions ==
=== Summary of versions by Ahmed Chawki ===
Release date	Version	Song title	Credits	Record Label	Languages	Music video
17 June 2013	Main	"Habibi I Love You"	Ahmed Chawki feat. Pitbull	Universal Music	AR / EN	Video on YouTube
July 2013	French version	"Habibi I Love You (Mon amour, I Love You"	Ahmed Chawki feat. Kenza Farah & Pitbull	Jo & Co. (downloads)	FR / AR / EN	Video on YouTube
July 2013	Spanish version	"Habibi I Love You"	Ahmed Chawki feat. Sophia del Carmen & Pitbull	Warner Music (Spain)	ES / AR / EN	Video on YouTube
22 November 2013	Dutch version	"Habibi I Love You"	Chawki feat. Pitbull & Do	Sony Music	NL / ES / AR / EN	Video on YouTube
17 December 2013	Romanian version	"Habibi I Love You"	Chawki feat. Pitbull & Mandinga	Roton	RO / ES / AR / EN	Video on YouTube
1 February 2014	Greek version	"Habibi I Love You"	Chawki feat. Pitbull & Fani Drakopoulou	Planetworks	GR / ES / AR / EN	

=== French version ===
The song became a hit in France and other French-speaking markets after a trilingual Arabic/French/English version was launched with additional lyrics by John Mamann sung by Chawki and French-Algerian singer Kenza Farah. Titled "Habibi I Love You (Mon amour, I Love You" it was credited to Ahmed Chawki featuring Kenza Farah & Pitbull. The music video was re-edited with additional footage of Kenza Farah. The song was presented live during "Fête de la Musique à Marseille 2013" and was presented on various French television stations.

=== Greek version ===
With the song already big in Greece and Cyprus, a Greek version was released in January 2014 featuring Pitbull and Greek singer Fani Drakopoulou (in Greek Φανή Δρακοπούλου) "Habibi I Love You" and subtitled "Χαλάλι Σ'αγαπώ". Chawki's main renditions in this version are in Spanish whereas Drakopoulou sings in Greek.

=== Spanish version ===
Simultaneously, a Hispanic version (trilingual Arabic/Spanish/English) was released with additional lyrics in Spanish composed by Armando Perez. The track was recorded with additional vocals by Sophia del Carmen. The Hispanic version was released by Warner Music Spain and was credited to Ahmed Chawki featuring Sophia del Carmen & Pitbull. Both Ahmed Chawki and Sophia del Carmen sing the Spanish verses. The Miami, Florida music video was re-edited, adding footage by del Carmen.

=== Dutch version ===
On 22 November 2013, a Dutch version was released which is a quadrilingual release in Arabic/Spanish/Dutch/English with the participation of the Dutch singer Do who sings parts in Dutch whereas Ahmed Chawki sings most of the lyrics in Spanish. It was released on Sony Music with the single appearing at number 10 in its first week of release on the official Dutch Single Top 100 charts, and climbed to number 5 (peak position). A separate new music video was released rather than a re-edit of the existing music video.

=== Versions by other artists ===
Romanian artists Nek and Blondu de la Timişoara have released a track title "Habibi", a remake of the song with an all-Romanian lyrics and new musical arrangement. The duo released a music video to accompany the sing. This non-official version gained popularity long before the official Romanian version featuring Mandinga.

== Charts ==
Ahmed Chawki featuring Pitbull

Peak (2013)	Highest position
France (SNEP)	153
Israel International Airplay (Media Forest)	1
Poland (Dance Top 50)	43

Chawki featuring Pitbull & Do

Peak (2013)	Highest position
Netherlands (Single Top 100)	5
Netherlands (Dutch Top 40); Tipparade*	42

*Did not chart in main Dutch Top 40 chart, but was #2 on the "bubbling under" Tipparade Chart

== See also ==
- "Habibi (I Need Your Love)"
