= Ghaddara Ya Dounya =

2021 single by Myriam Fares

Single by Myriam Faris
- Genre: Arabic Pop
- Length: 3:10
- Label: Myriam Music
- Songwriter: Rola Fares
- Producer: Idriss Rouchiche

Myriam Fares singles chronology
"Zahra (Hala Helwa)" (2021)	"Ghaddara Ya Dounya" (2021)	"Maalesh" (2022)

"Ghaddara Ya Dounya" (Arabic: "غدارة يا دنيا", English: "Difficult Life") is a song by Lebanese singer Myriam Fares. It was released on June 3, 2021, in Fares's Netflix documentary, Myriam Fares: The Journey, and later on June 4, 2021, on YouTube by her own label Myriam Music. The song served as the lead single from her upcoming sixth studio album. It was written by her sister Rola Fares and was produced by Idriss Rouchiche.

== Background ==
In the documentary, Fares announced that every once in a while a song from the album will be released and not all at once due to the difficult situations that the world is going through, especially her country Lebanon. The song's official music video received 6 million views in the first week of its release.

== Charts ==
Chart performance for "Ghaddara Ya Dounya"
Chart (2021)	Peak position
Lebanon (The Official Lebanese Top 20)	10
