= Gloryland World Cup USA 94 =

Gloryland Soccer Rocks the Globe: World Cup USA 94

Compilation album by Various artists
- Released: 1994
- Recorded: 1994
- Genres: Pop, rock
- Labels: Mercury Records (United States); PolyGram Records/Phonogram (Worldwide)
- Producer: Various producers

Various artists chronology
Gloryland; Soccer Rocks the Globe: World Cup USA 94 (1994)	Allez! Ola! Ole! (1998)

Singles from Gloryland World Cup USA 94
- 1. "Gloryland" Released: 30 March 1994

Global edition
- Global edition

Professional ratings
Review scores
Source	Rating
Music Week	3/5 stars

Gloryland World Cup USA 94 is a compilation album with various artists, released in 1994. This album is the official music album of the 1994 FIFA World Cup held in the United States, the first ever World Cup official music album. It has been also published under titles such as Soccer Rocks the Globe: World Cup USA 94. The Global album contains a slightly different set of songs flavored by European-language songs and arrangements not found on Soccer Rocks the World.

A Latin American version of the album was also released.

== Track listing ==
1. Queen — "We Are the Champions" (Producer: Queen)
2. Daryl Hall & Sounds of Blackness — "Gloryland" (Producer: Charlie Skarbek)
3. James — "Goal, Goal, Goal" (Producer: Brian Eno)
4. Tears for Fears — "New Star" (Producer: Alan Griffiths, Roland Orzabal)
5. The Moody Blues — "This Is the Moment" (Producer: Dennis Lambert)
6. Fleetwood Mac — "Blow by Blow" (Producer: Fleetwood Mac)
7. Jon Bon Jovi — "Blaze of Glory" (Producer: Danny Kortchmar, Jon Bon Jovi)
8. Tina Turner — "The Best" (Producer: Dan Hartman, Tina Turner)
9. Gary Glitter — "Rock & Roll '94"
10. Scorpions — "Under the Same Sun" (Producer: Bruce Fairbairn, Scorpions)
11. Kool & the Gang — "Celebration '94 (Remix)" (Producer - Eumir Deodato) (Remix Producer: Darryl James)
12. Santana — "Luz, Amor Y Vida" (Producer: Carlos Santana)
13. The Crowd — "Anthem (Alé, Alé, Alé, Alé)" (Producer: Charlie Skarbek)
14. "Gloryland (Instrumental)"

=== European edition ===
1. Queen — "We Are the Champions" (Producer: Queen)
2. Daryl Hall & Sounds of Blackness — "Gloryland"
3. Vazelina Bilopphøggers — "Duellen I L.A." (Producer: Ole Evenrude)
4. James — "Goal, Goal, Goal" (Producer: Brian Eno)
5. The Crowd — "Anthem (Olé, Olé, Olé, Olé/Aida)" (Producer: Charlie Skarbek)
6. Tears for Fears — "New Star"
7. Jahn Teigen — "På Vei Til USA" (Producer: Rolf Graff)
8. The Moody Blues — "This Is the Moment"
9. Fleetwood Mac — "Blow by Blow"
10. Stelle Azzurre — "Italia Ancora (Italy Once More)" (Producer: Tex, Ringo, Zippo)
11. Jon Bon Jovi — "Blaze of Glory"
12. Tina Turner — "The Best"
13. Kool & the Gang — "Celebration '94 (Remix)"
14. Scorpions — "No Pain, No Gain"
15. Santana — "Luz, Amor y Vida"
16. Daryl Hall — "Move on Up" (Producer: Joe Nicolo)
17. Peter Koelewijn & Gerry Marsden — "You'll Never Walk Alone" (Producer: Charlie Skarbek)
18. Glory featuring Snake Davis — "Gloryland (Emotion mix)" (Producer: Charlie Skarbek)

=== Asian edition ===
1. Queen — "We Are the Champions" (Producer: Queen)
2. Daryl Hall & Sounds of Blackness — "Gloryland"
3. James — "Goal, Goal, Goal" (Producer: Brian Eno)
4. The Crowd — "Anthem (Olé, Olé, Olé, Olé/Aida)" (Producer: Charlie Skarbek)
5. Tears for Fears — "New Star"
6. The Moody Blues — "This Is the Moment"
7. Fleetwood Mac — "Blow by Blow"
8. Stelle Azzurre — "Italia Ancora (Italy Once More)" (Producer: Tex, Ringo, Zippo)
9. Jon Bon Jovi — "Blaze of Glory"
10. Tina Turner — "The Best"
11. Gary Glitter — "Rock & Roll '94"
12. Kool & the Gang — "Celebration '94 (Remix)"
13. Scorpions — "No Pain, No Gain"
14. Santana — "Luz, Amor y Vida"
15. Daryl Hall — "Move on Up" (Producer: Joe Nicolo)
16. Peter Koelewijn & Gerry Marsden — "You'll Never Walk Alone" (Producer: Charlie Skarbek)
17. Glory featuring Snake Davis — "Gloryland (Emotion mix)" (Producer: Charlie Skarbek)

=== Charts ===
Chart (1994)	Peak position
Argentinian Albums	1
German Compilation Albums (Offizielle Top 100)	21

== See also ==
- List of FIFA World Cup songs and anthems
