= Magic in the Air =

Single by Magic System featuring Chawki

from the album Africainement vôtre
- Language: French, English
- Released: March 17, 2014
- Recorded: 2014
- Genre: Pop
- Length: 3:53
- Label: Parlophone; Warner
- Songwriters: Magic System; RedOne; Bilal Hajji; John Mamann; Alex P; Chawki
- Producers: RedOne; Bilal Hajji; John Mamann; Alex P; Magic System

Magic System singles chronology
"Mamadou" (2013)	"Magic in the Air" (2014)	"Tu es fou" (2014)

Chawki singles chronology
"Habibi I Love You" (2013)	"Magic in the Air" (2014)	"Time of Our Lives" (2014)

Music video
- "Magic in the Air" on YouTube

"Magic in the Air" is a 2014 single by Ivorian musical group Magic System, featuring Moroccan singer Chawki and produced by Moroccan producer RedOne. The track also appears on Magic System's album Africainement vôtre, released on 19 May 2014.

== Content ==
The association football themed song focusing on African football was produced by Swedish-Moroccan producer RedOne. Part of the lyrics say:

On t'invite à la magie, y a pas de raccourci,
Oublie tes soucis, viens faire la folie
Feel the magic in the air, allez allez allez,
Levez les mains en l'air, allez allez allez.
We invite you to the magic, and there are no shortcuts
Forget your worries, and come and join the madness
Feel the magic in the air, go on, go on, go on
Raise your hands in the air, go on, go on, go on.

The song was released in March 2014 to coincide with preparations for the 2014 FIFA World Cup scheduled for 12 June to 13 July of the same year. Despite the English title of the song, its lyrics are in French except for the phrase "Feel the magic in the air".

The single became a commercial hit in France and Belgium, earning significant airplay in stadiums during football matches.

It was played every time France scored a goal at the 2018 FIFA World Cup, which saw them win the whole tournament.

== Music video ==
A music video was also shot and released online on Magic System official YouTube account on 17 March 2014.

Pathé Mboup, the young boy in a yellow jersey showing off football skills at the beginning of the music video later became a professional footballer and played for the Senegal national team.

== UNESCO literacy initiative ==
As part of its literacy initiative, UNESCO launched a campaign for celebrity signing of FIFA-sanctioned footballs to be used in the 2014 World Cup. Many celebrities from the sports world, artists and politicians signed various balls to be sold in public auction between 4 and 14 June 2014, with all the proceeds from selling of these signed balls going to the alphabetization programme of the organization.

A promotional music video was also made in promoting the charity initiative with various participants signing the balls or playing football or symbolically "passing the ball" to other participants who would sign in their turn. Magic System official website posted direct links to individual signed balls to help in bidding for them.

The celebrities taking part included:

- Sports players / coaches: Javier Pastore, David Luiz, Yaya Touré, Olivier Giroud, Marion Bartoli, Clément Grenier, Brandao, Bacary Sagna, Arsène Wenger, Amaury Leveaux, Adrien Rabiot, Bafétimbi Gomis, Laurent Koscielny, Jérôme Alonzo, Gaëtane Thiney, Florent Malouda, Eric Carrière, Patrick Vieira, Olivier Missoup, Olivier Dacourt, Robert Pires, Rio Mavuba, Raymond Domenech, Sylvain Wiltord, Luis Fernandez
- Music artists: M Pokora, Soprano, Youssoupha, Zaho
- Media personalities and sportswriters / hosts: Astrid Bard, Sébastien Cauet, Cyril Hanouna, Nathalie Iannetta, Isabelle Ithurburu, Pierre Ménès, Patrick Sébastien, Darren Tulett
- Others: Arnaud "Séan" Garnier

"Asalfo" (Salif Traoré) of Magic System is an Ambassador of Goodwill for UNESCO's literacy programme.

== Charts ==
=== Weekly charts ===
Chart (2014)	Peak position
Belgium (Ultratop 50 Flanders)	10
Belgium Dance Bubbling Under (Ultratop Flanders)	6
Belgium (Ultratop 50 Wallonia)	1
Belgium Dance (Ultratop Wallonia)	3
France (Club 40)	1
France (SNEP)	3
Germany (GfK)	64
Lebanon (Lebanese Top 20)	1
Luxembourg (Billboard)	3
Poland Airplay (ZPAV)	20
Poland Dance (ZPAV)	3
Poland (Video Chart)	5
Switzerland (Schweizer Hitparade)	23

=== Year-end charts ===
Chart (2014)	Position
Belgium (Ultratop Flanders)	73
Belgium (Ultratop Wallonia)	8
France (SNEP)	17

== Certifications ==
Region	Certification	Certified units/sales
Belgium (BRMA)	Gold	15,000^{*}
France (SNEP)	Diamond	333,333^{‡}
^{*} Sales figures based on certification alone.^{‡} Sales+streaming figures based on certification alone.
