= Tukoh Taka =

Single by Nicki Minaj, Maluma and Myriam Fares

from the album FIFA World Cup Qatar 2022 Official Soundtrack
- Language: English; Spanish; Arabic
- Released: November 18, 2022
- Genre: Reggaeton; pop; house-rap
- Length: 2:58
- Label: Universal Arabic; Republic
- Songwriters: David Alberto Macias; David Macias; Diamante Anthony Blackmon; Donny Flores; Gary Walker; Illimite; Juan Luis Londoño Arias; Juan Salinas; Monique Fonseca-Luchese; Myriam Fares; Nicki Minaj; Oscar Salinas; Raul Antonio Treviño; Sari Abboud; Steven Cespedes; Wassim Salibi
- Producers: Play-N-Skillz; Gordo; Sari Abboud

Nicki Minaj singles chronology
"Love in the Way" (2022)	"Tukoh Taka" (2022)	"WTF" (2023)

Maluma singles chronology
"Ojala" (2022)	"Tukoh Taka" (2022)	"La Fórmula" (2023)

Myriam Fares singles chronology
"Adiha Enbisat" (2022)	"Tukoh Taka" (2022)	"North Coast" (2023)

Music video
- "Tukoh Taka" on YouTube

"Tukoh Taka" is the 2022 FIFA Fan Festival anthem performed by Trinidadian rapper Nicki Minaj, Colombian singer Maluma and Lebanese singer Myriam Fares. It was released by FIFA for the 2022 FIFA World Cup soundtrack on November 18, 2022, through Universal Arabic Music and Republic Records along with an accompanying music video.

== Composition ==
The song features the three artists' languages in the lyrics: Minaj's English, Maluma's Spanish, and Fares' Arabic, becoming the first world championship anthem to feature all three languages. Fares said in a statement: "'Tukoh Taka', the song that I was honored to participate in its composition, arrangement, and choreography, made me more passionate about it, in addition to working alongside two of my favorite international artists, Nicki Minaj and Maluma. I truly wish that 'Tukoh Taka' will be transmitting the Eastern culture and Arabian music to the whole world.”

The song has reggaeton, Pop and house-rap sounds.

The name of the song is said to be Arabic for "knock-knock", with fans and commenters also recognising it to sound like "tiki-taka", a style of football play.

== Critical reaction ==
Forbes's writer Chris Malone Méndez said the pairing of the two international artists with the Arab singer "was a natural choice for optimal global reach" however while song was praised for representing diversity, it also received criticism. The song received negative reactions in the Arab world. Fans and critics accused Myriam Fares of imitating Shakira's dancing style and overall aesthetics. According to Haaretz, numerous online critics said the song had "annoying lyrics".

== Controversy ==
After the announcement of their collaboration for the World Cup anthem, the three artists were criticised for choosing to be paid to sing a song in an Emirate whose internal policies violate LGBT rights and support perceived slavery. Singer Maluma replied to the charge by declaring: "it's something I can't resolve; [...] It's not something that I actually have to be involved with. I'm here enjoying my music and the beautiful life, playing soccer too". FIFA has also been under fire online for featuring Fares considering her blackface stunt in her "Goumi" (2018) music video.

== Music video ==
The music video, directed by Edgar Esteves and Juan Felipe Zuleta, features Maluma and Fares performing in the Qatari desert, while Minaj performs her verses aboard a bus, all alternating with some clips of soccer players cheering after goals.

== Charts ==
Chart performance for "Tukoh Taka"
Chart (2022–2023)	Peak position
Canada CHR/Top 40 (Billboard)	49
Central America Anglo (Monitor Latino)	1
Croatia (HRT)	63
Global 200 (Billboard)	106
Greece International (IFPI)	88
Japan Hot Overseas (Billboard Japan)	7
Lebanon (Lebanese Top 20)	1
MENA (IFPI)	11
New Zealand Hot Singles (RMNZ)	15
Turkey (Radiomonitor Türkiye)	6
UK Singles Downloads (Official Charts)	100
US Digital Song Sales (Billboard)	13
US Hot Latin Songs (Billboard)	18
US Rhythmic Airplay (Billboard)	28
US World Digital Song Sales (Billboard)	2

== Certifications ==
Certifications for "Tukoh Taka"
Region	Certification	Certified units/sales
Poland (ZPAV)	Gold	25,000^{‡}
^{‡} Sales+streaming figures based on certification alone.
