= Trinidad Cardona =

American singer, songwriter and social media personality (born 1999)

- Born: May 23, 1999 (age 27); Phoenix, Arizona, U.S.
- Genres: West Coast hip-hop; R&B; Latin fusion
- Occupations: Singer; songwriter
- Instrument: Vocals
- Label: Def Jam

Trinidad Cardona (born May 23, 1999) is an American singer, songwriter and social media personality. He first went viral for his song "Jennifer" released in 2017. His single, "Dinero", peaked at 46 on the Billboard Global 200 after becoming viral on TikTok. In 2022, he released the song "Love Me Back". His 2022 song, "Hayya Hayya (Better Together)" (with Davido and Aisha), was included on the 2022 FIFA World Cup Soundtrack.

== Early life ==
Cardona was born on May 23, 1999, in Phoenix, Arizona. He is of mixed Mexican and African-American ancestry. When he was 4, his father was imprisoned. Cardona lived with his grandmother in Michoacan, Mexico and was raised by her most of his early life. At an early age, he became interested in music and rapping, often posting them online. In early 2017, he went viral for a video freestyling the chorus to his song later titled "Jennifer" in the bathroom of his high school in Glendale, Arizona.

== Career ==
Cardona first rose to prominence in 2017 with the release of “Jennifer,” which led to a deal with labels including Island Records. The song was made after the freestyle recorded in his high school bathroom went viral on Facebook, later spreading to other social media platforms. He released more singles, but none of them generated another hit leading him to be dropped from the label. After his initial success died down, Cardona found himself delivering food and working other odd jobs to support himself.

In early 2021, Cardona's 2017 single "Dinero" resurfaced on TikTok, gaining massive popularity. The track quickly became the No. 1 song on TikTok’s viral chart, amassing over 65 million streams across platforms and landing on the Billboard Global 200 chart. This resurgence provided Cardona with a momentum to relaunch his career as he rejoined Island Records. He expressed a desire to release Latin fusion music, as an ode to his heritage.

In 2022, he released "Love Me Back", which accumulated millions of streams and success on TikTok. He was included on "Hayya Hayya (Better Together)", released in 2022 for the FIFA World Cup. He released the single "Hurt Me" in 2024. Since then, the popularity of his music has declined, although he still has almost 5 million monthly listeners on Spotify as of February 2026.

== Discography ==
=== Mixtapes ===
Title	Mixtape details
Humble Beginnings	Released: September 14, 2018; Label: Run-It-Up; Format: Digital download, streaming
I Understand	Released: December 18, 2018; Label: Foundation; Format: Digital download, streaming
Por Favor	Released: December 3, 2021; Label: Run-It-Up; Format: Digital download, streaming

=== Extended plays ===
Title	EP details
Jennifer	Released: April 24, 2017; Label: Self-released; Format: Digital download, streaming
Love	Released: February 14, 2019; Label: Foundation; Format: Digital download, streaming
Aventura	Released: May 3, 2019; Label: Foundation; Format: Digital download, streaming

=== Singles ===
Title	Year	Peak chart positions										Certifications	Album
Title	Year	US Bub.	CAN	FRA	GER	IRE	NLD	SWE	SWI	UK	WW	Certifications	Album
"Dinero"	2017	—	—	—	—	—	—	—	—	—	—		Non-album single
"Jennifer"	2017	—	—	—	—	—	—	—	—	—	—		Jennifer
"Dinero" (re-release)	2018	18	40	25	23	62	21	67	11	50	46	RIAA: Gold; BPI: Silver; SNEP: Platinum	Non-album singles
"Even If" (solo or remix with Layton Greene)	2018	—	—	—	—	—	—	—	—	—	—		Non-album singles
"Hayya Hayya (Better Together)" (with Davido and Aisha)	2022	—	—	—	—	—	—	—	—	—	—		2022 FIFA World Cup soundtrack
"Love Me Back (Fayahh Beat)" (with Robinson)	2022	—	—	—	—	—	—	—	—	—	—		Non-album single
"Christmas with You"	2022	—	—	—	—	—	—	—	—	—	—		Def the Halls
