= Ahmed Chawki =

Moroccan singer

Ahmed Chawki أحمد شوقي
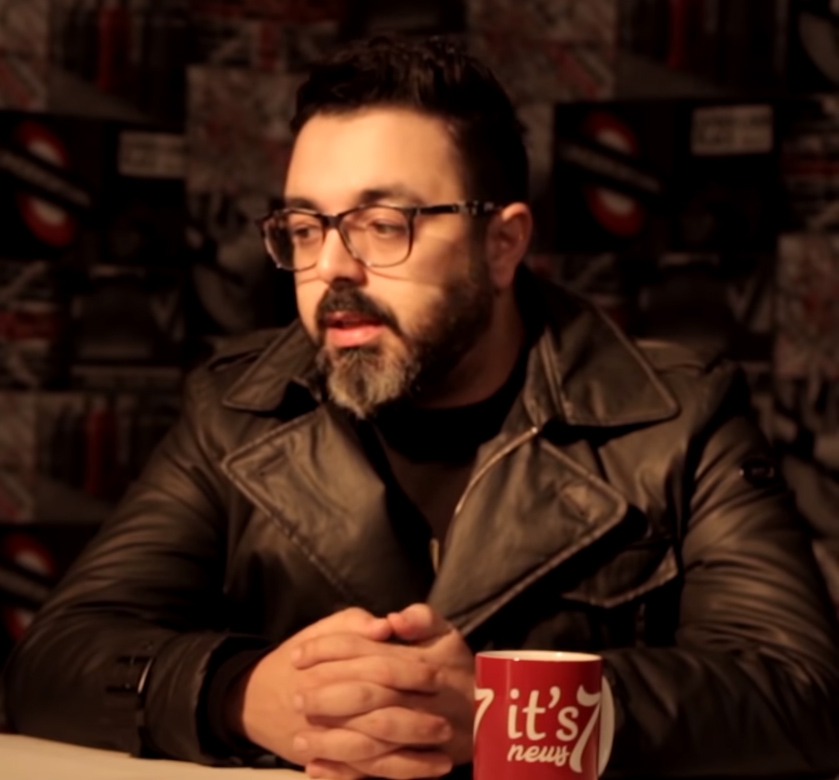
- Chawki in 2019

Background information
- Born: 31 December 1982 (age 43); Tétouan, Morocco
- Genres: Pop; Moroccan pop
- Occupations: Singer; songwriter; producer
- Years active: 2008–present

Ahmed Chawki (Arabic: أحمد شوقي; born 31 December 1982), known professionally by his stage name Chawki, is a Moroccan singer, songwriter, and producer. Chawki began his career in the early 2000s. He had a music band named La Paloma which mainly focused on Arabic and Moroccan music. On occasion of the 2014 World Cup, he was featured in a football-themed song "Magic in the Air" by Magic System, a hit in France and Belgium. He is currently signed to RedOne Records, an international record label founded and owned by the producer.

== Early life ==
Ahmed Chawki was born on 31 December 1982 in the town of Jbeldersa, Tétouan in Morocco. He has been composing and singing poems since childhood. He studied at the National School of Theatre and Singing in Tétouan, and took part in a number of events and won several awards. He then enrolled at the Institute of Fine Arts in Tétouan, specializing in classical and Western singing, while studying musical theory.

== Music career ==
=== Early career ===
In 2000, Chawki took the first prize at the Arab Music Festival, organized by "Maison du Littoral" in Tetouan. He then formed his musical band La Paloma alongside other young musicians. La Paloma that made a fusion sound based on Arab, Moroccan and flamenco music participated for years to come on several national and international festivals, with big success and media coverage. As a result, he became a regular guest on television shows and on radio channels, including 2M via the program Nasima and Chanel One. His hit songs included "Ya Lmima", "La Paloma" and "Sinine", the latter in collaboration with the Spanish band Librejano.

2009 and 2010 saw release of further hits by Chawki including "Inta Lya", "Ya Nassini", "Ghaly" and "La Paloma" with moderate success, despite lack of support by record labels.

=== 2013: Breakthrough ===
Chawki caught the attention of RedOne during the production of the collective pan-Arab operetta work "Bukra" (in Arabic بكرة meaning tomorrow) in cooperation with Quincy Jones. Eventually Chawki was included alongside a great number of Arab artists in the project. Ahmed Chawki's breakthrough came in 2012, when he teamed up with RedOne. At that time, RedOne had produced Khaled's latest album C'est la vie and the title track "C'est la vie" opening the door for further collaborations with Middle East acts including Ahmed Chawki with "Habibi I Love You", a multilingual crossover song with Arabic elements and western dance tunes. In 2013, his collaboration with Moroccan–Swedish producer RedOne in the international hit "Habibi I Love You" (meaning "darling, I love you") featuring the American rapper Pitbull was a huge success. The song became a big summer hit on the Middle Eastern charts as well as charting Europe, including France and the Netherlands.

The main version of "Habibi I Love You" by Ahmed Chawki featuring Pitbull became a big hit during the summer of 2013, with a live performance during the closing ceremonies of Festival Mawazine 2013 in Rabat and topping the charts in Lebanon, Egypt and the Persian Gulf area during summer 2013.

The song was notably a hit in France charting in SNEP, the official French Singles Chart with additional French lyrics as "Habibi I Love You (Mon Amour I Love you)" with vocals featuring French-Algerian singer Kenza Farah. The French trilingual version was launched with a live performance in Marseille during the "Fête de la Musique" on 21 June 2013. It was popularized in Spain and all Hispanic markets with additional Spanish lyrics interpreted both by Ahmed Chawki and singer Sophia Del Carmen, and rap by Pitbull. The song was a summer hit in the Netherlands through a Dutch version that included Dutch singer Do van Hulst, The Dutch version, actually a multilingual Dutch, Spanish, English and Arabic version was credited to Chawki featuring Pitbull & Do. It was performed by Chawki and Do on RTL Late Night. The song also sold quite well in Scandinavian markets owing to involvement of RedOne, who had started his career in Sweden. Chawki's song has been covered including in Romanian as "Habibi" by Nek si Blondu de la Timișoara. Ahmed Chawki released an official Romanian version that features Mandinga with additional Romanian lyrics. Chawki performs his parts in Arabic and Spanish.

The song has been subject to great number of remixes and appears in a number of compilations. It also remains greatly popular with zumba fitness exercise adherents.

Chawki released his second single "Ana Bahwak" (I Adore You) also produced by RedOne

=== 2014: Further success ===
On occasion of the 2014 World Cup, Ahmed Chawki – now going with the mononym Chawki – was featured in a football-themed song "Magic in the Air" by Magic System, in preparation for the 2014 FIFA World Cup in Brazil. The song was a hit in France and Belgium and many other European charts. As in the case of "Habibi I Love You", its track was produced by RedOne.

He simultaneously released his solo single "Time of Our Lives" again produced by RedOne and released on RedOne Records. A French-language version as "Time of Our Lives (Notre Moment)" and an Arabic version "Farhat al 'Aalam" were also released.

== Awards and nominations ==
=== Africa Music Video Awards ===
Year	Nominee / work	Award	Result	Ref
2016	Tsunami	African Video of the Year	Nominated	
2016	Tsunami	Best North African Video	Nominated	
2016	Tsunami	Best African Dance Video	Nominated	

== Discography ==
=== Singles ===
Year	Singles	Peak positions				Notes
Year	Singles	FRA	BEL (Wa)	NED Dutch Top 40	NED Single Top 100	Notes
2013	"Habibi I Love You" (featuring Pitbull) (France) (featuring Pitbull & Do) (Netherlands)	153	–	2 (Note: Did not chart in the main Belgian Ultratop chart, but on the "bubbling under" Belgian Ultratip chart) (Tip)	5	Versions of "Habibi I Love You": Ahmed Chawki featuring Kenza Farah & Pitbull; Ahmed Chawki featuring Sophia del Carmen & Pitbull; Ahmed Chawki featuring Pitbull & Do; Ahmed Chawki featuring Mandinga & Pitbull
2014	"Time of Our Lives"	15	13 (Note: Did not chart in the main Dutch 40 chart, but on the "bubbling under" Dutch Tipparade chart) (Ultratip)	–	–	Versions of "Time of Our Lives": "Time of Our Lives (Notre Moment)" (mainly French); "Farhat al 'Aalam" (mainly Arabic)
2014	"It's My Life (Don't Worry)" (featuring Dr. Alban)	187	–	–	–	

Non charting single releases

- 2009: "Inta liya"
- 2010: "Ya Nasini Ya Habibi" (in Arabic يا ناسيني يا حبيبي)
- 2010: "Ghaly" (in Arabic غالي)
- 2014: "Ana Bahwak" (in Arabic أنا بهواك)
- 2014: "Come Alive" (featuring RedOne)
- 2015: "Kayna Wla Makaynach" (in Arabic كاينة ولا ماكيناش)
- 2016: "Tsunami" (in Arabic تسونامي)
- 2017: "Qahwa" (in Arabic قهوة)
- 2017: "Sin Tee" featuring Seeya (in Arabic سين تي)
- 2017: "Insaha" featuring Omar (in Arabic إنساها)
- 2018: "Amirah" (in Arabic أميرة)
- 2019: "Sofia" (in Arabic صوفيا)
- 2020: “Together We Rise”
- 2020: “Jawbni Lillah” Arabic جاوبني لله)

==== Featured in ====
Year	Album	Peak positions						Certification	Album
Year	Album	BEL (Vl)	BEL (Wa)	FRA	GER	NED Single Top 100	SWI	Certification	Album
2006	"Head Bussas" (Pitbull feat. Ahmed Chawki)	-	-	-	-	-	-		Unleashed, Vol. 4 Pitbull
2014	"Magic in the Air" (Magic System feat. Chawki)	10	1	3	64	-	23		Magic System album Africainement vôtre
2018	"Amsterdam Marrakech" (Ali B feat. Ahmed Chawki, Soufiane Eddyani & Brahim Darri)	-	-	-	-	153	-		Magic System album Africainement vôtre
