= Ramenez la coupe à la maison =

Single by Vegedream

from the album Marchand de sable
- Language: French
- Released: 19 July 2018
- Length: 3:55
- Songwriters: Ken "Evasion" Bora; Sachtela Evrard Djedje
- Producer: Ken "Evasion" Bora

Vegedream singles chronology
"La rue" (2018)	"Ramenez la coupe à la maison" (2018)	"Ma go sure" (2019)

Music video
- "Ramenez la coupe à la maison" on YouTube

"Ramenez la coupe à la maison" ("Bring the Cup Back Home") is a song by French musician Vegedream. It was released on 19 July 2018, a few days after the France national football team won at the 2018 FIFA World Cup. The song reached number one on the French Singles Chart in its second week of release.

== Charts ==
=== Weekly charts ===
Weekly chart performance for "Ramenez la coupe à la maison"
Chart (2018–2021)	Peak position
Austria (Ö3 Austria Top 40)	7
Belgium (Ultratop 50 Wallonia)	27
Denmark (Tracklisten)	17
France (SNEP)	1
Germany (GfK)	9
Hungary (Single Top 40)	10
Hungary (Stream Top 40)	22
Ireland (IRMA)	52
Netherlands (Single Top 100)	26
Norway (VG-lista)	12
Portugal (AFP)	38
Spain (PROMUSICAE)	51
Sweden (Sverigetopplistan)	13
Switzerland (Schweizer Hitparade)	3
UK Singles (Official Charts)	60
UK Hip Hop/R&B (Official Charts)	17

=== Year-end charts ===
Year-end chart performance for "Ramenez la coupe à la maison"
Chart (2018)	Position
France (SNEP)	7
Chart (2019)	Position
France (SNEP)	70
Chart (2021)	Position
Sweden (Sverigetopplistan)	79
Switzerland (Schweizer Hitparade)	53

== Certifications ==
Certifications for "Ramenez la coupe à la maison"
Region	Certification	Certified units/sales
Denmark (IFPI Danmark)	Platinum	90,000^{‡}
France (SNEP)	Diamond	333,333^{‡}
Germany (BVMI)	Gold	200,000^{‡}
Italy (FIMI)	Gold	50,000^{‡}
Norway (IFPI Norway)	Platinum	60,000^{‡}
Poland (ZPAV)	Platinum	50,000^{‡}
Portugal (AFP)	Platinum	10,000^{‡}
Spain (Promusicae)	Platinum	40,000^{‡}
United Kingdom (BPI)	Silver	200,000^{‡}
Streaming
Greece (IFPI Greece)	Gold	1,000,000^{†}
Sweden (GLF)	Platinum	8,000,000^{†}
^{‡} Sales+streaming figures based on certification alone.^{†} Streaming-only figures based on certification alone.
