= Gloryland (FIFA World Cup) =

1994 song

"Gloryland (Instrumental)"

Single by Glory

from the album Gloryland
- Released: 1994
- Recorded: 1994
- Label: Mercury (USA); PolyGram (worldwide)
- Songwriter: Traditional

"Gloryland" was the official song of the 1994 FIFA World Cup held in the United States.

== Instrumental version ==
The instrumental version, largely based on the traditional spiritual song "Glory, Glory (Lay My Burden Down)", was performed by a formation named "Glory" with Charles John Skarbek as producer, Richard Simon Blaskey as executive producer with Snake (Chris) Davis featured prominently playing on the saxophone.

It was released on Mercury Records for American distribution and PolyGram Records Inc. worldwide. The instrumental appears in the 1994 album released under the album entitled Soccer Rocks the Globe.

Tracks:

1. "Gloryland"
2. "Gloryland (Action Mix)"
3. "Gloryland (Emotion Mix)"
4. "In Gloria (Spanish Version)"

== Vocal version ==
"Gloryland"
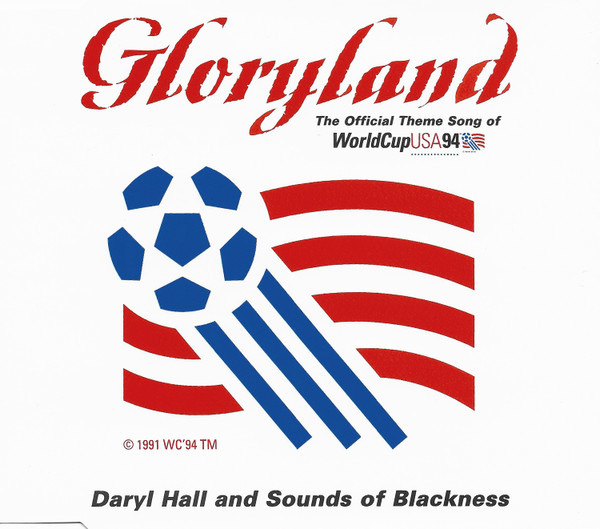

Single by Daryl Hall and Sounds of Blackness

from the album Gloryland World Cup USA 94
- Released: 1994
- Recorded: 1994
- Genre: Pop-R&B; gospel
- Label: Mercury; PolyGram; Phonogram
- Songwriter: Traditional

With added lyrics for the World Cup occasion, "Gloryland" became a 1994 song by American singer Daryl Hall and the vocal and instrumental ensemble Sounds of Blackness. The song also appears on the official FIFA World Cup album Gloryland World Cup USA 94 under the title Soccer Rocks the Globe.

Daryl Hall and Sounds of Blackness also sang it at the opening ceremonies of the FIFA World Cup with lyrics. It was also used as the theme to ITV's coverage of the tournament. Hall told Music & Media in 1994, "I think we worked together well because we have the same background. I did my first singing in gospel choirs."

The accompanying music video was directed by Morgan Lawley and produced by Nicci Power. Steve Chivers directed photography.

=== Critical reception ===
Larry Flick from Billboard magazine wrote, "Patterned after 'The Battle Hymn of the Republic', single from the just-issued Soccer Rocks the World is awash in dewy-eyed sincerity. With Hall trading off lead lines with various members of S.O.B., this sweet and slow pop/R&B track builds to a blasting, gospel-like climax. Expect this one to connect with the same folks who tear up during Whitney Houston's 'One Moment in Time'." Music & Media noted, "The official theme of the World Cup Finals this summer in the US is a modern gospel hymn. If the players on the pitch generate a similar enthusiasm, the championships will be superb." Dele Fadele from NME said, "'Gloryland' is sentimental, self-regarding and overblown in excelsis — true adult-orientated mush." Alex Kadis from Smash Hits gave it two out of five, viewing it as "a big, patriotic American tune which is overblown, overemotional and, erm, over the hill."

=== Charts ===
Chart (1994)	Peak position
Netherlands (Dutch Top 40)	32
Netherlands (Dutch Single Tip)	10
Switzerland (Schweizer Hitparade)	37
UK Singles (OCC)	36

== See also ==
- List of FIFA World Cup songs and anthems
