= Gloryland (Raymond Cilliers album) =

Studio album by Raymond Cilliers
- Released: 1994
- Recorded: 1993–1994
- Venue: South Africa
- Genre: Contemporary christian; gospel
- Label: Brettian Productions

Raymond Cilliers chronology
Gloryland (1994)	Lord I Thank You (1997)

Gloryland is the debut studio album by the contemporary Christian and gospel singer Raymond Cilliers.

== Track listing ==
1. "Glory Land"
2. "Mourning into Dancing"
3. "I Call Him Lord"
4. "Jericho"
5. "Mensekind"
6. "Prayer Is the Key to Heaven"
7. "Jesus Will Hold Me"
8. "Just a Little"
9. "Straatpredikant"
10. "Always be a Child"
11. "Verbly jou in die Here"
12. "Standing by"

== Certifications ==
Region	Certification	Certified units/sales
South Africa (RISA)	Gold	20,000^
