= Myriam Fares =

Lebanese singer, dancer and actress (born 1983)

Myriam Fares ميريام فارس
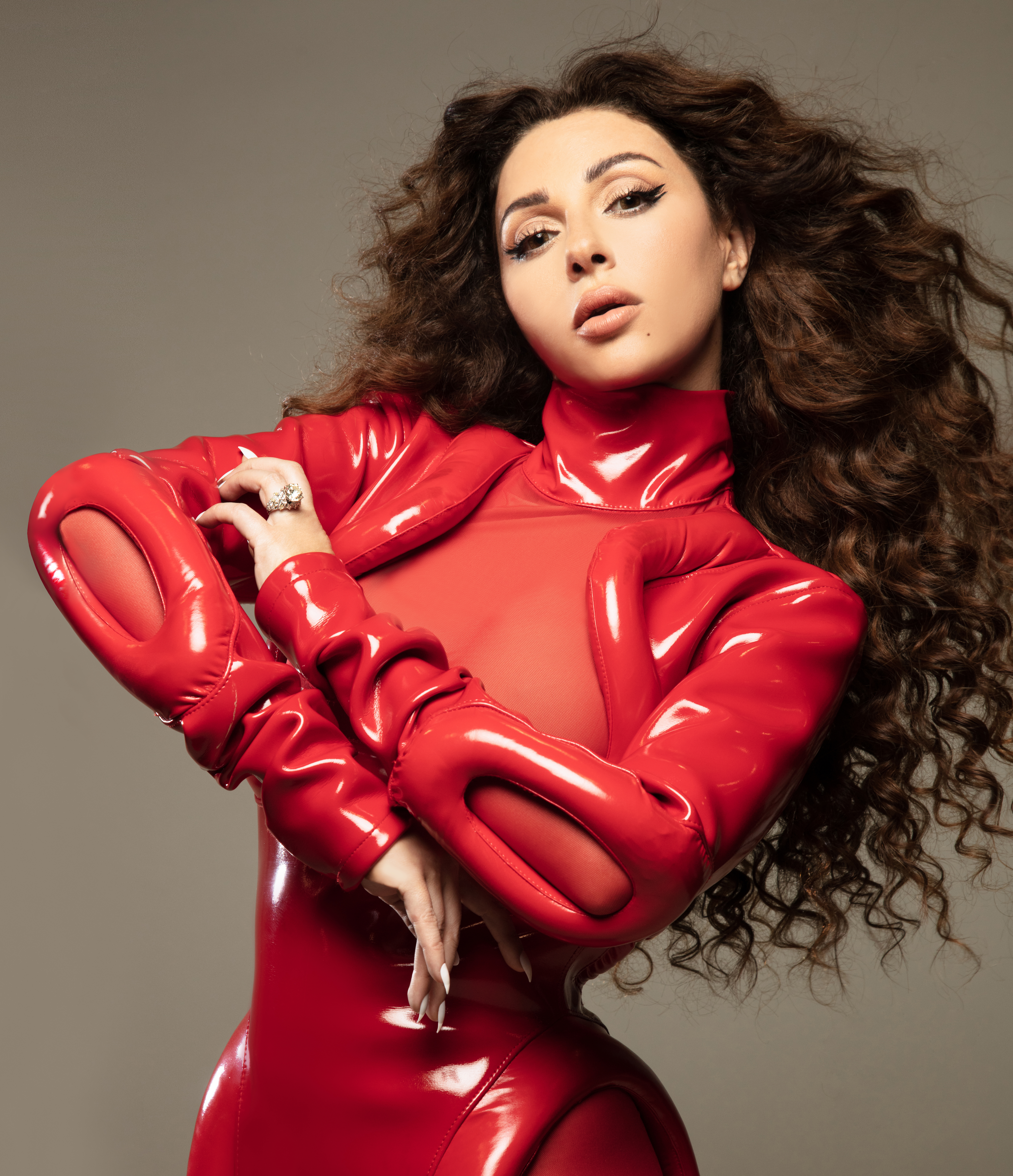
- Fares in 2019

Background information
- Born: 3 May 1983 (age 43); Kfar Chellal, South Governorate, Lebanon
- Genres: Arabic pop; EDM
- Occupations: Singer, performer, and singerwriter
- Years active: 2003–present
- Label: Myriam Music
- Spouse: Dany Metri (m. 2014)
- Website: myriamfares.com

Myriam Fares (Arabic: ميريام فارس, mīryam fāris; born 3 May 1983) is a Lebanese singer, actress, and entertainer. She began her career in 2003, and released her debut single "Ana Wel Shoq". Following the success of that single, she released her self-titled debut studio album Myriam (2003). She is known in the Arab world as the "Queen of The Stage" for her unique choreographed dance routines and performances.

Fares made her acting debut with the television series Itiham. The following year, her fifth studio album Aman broke the record for being the most played album on the streaming service Anghami. In 2021, Fares starred in her own Netflix documentary film Myriam Fares: The Journey, which made her the first Middle Eastern and Arab artist to release a documentary on Netflix, with it ranking at number 1 in several countries worldwide. Her 2018 single "Goumi" gained popularity on TikTok after a viral dance challenge Fares created surpassed 10 billion total views. Fares also collaborated with other musicians Nicki Minaj and Maluma in 2022 on the official FIFA World Cup single, "Tukoh Taka".

== Life and career ==
=== 1983–2005: Early life, beginnings and Nadini ===
Myriam Arbal Fares was born on May 3, 1983 in Kfar Chellal, a small village in Southern Lebanon. Her journey in the world of arts began at the age of five when she started learning classical ballet. At the age of nine, she exhibited her talents on the television program Al Mawaheb Al Saghira and was honored with the first prize in oriental dancing by the Lebanese Public Television. Fares joined the Lebanese National Conservatory at the age of fifteen, dedicating four years to learning the foundations of oriental singing. At the age of 16, Myriam achieved the top position at the Festival of the Lebanese Song under the management of UNESCO in Lebanon. At the age of seventeen, she made her mark on the television talent program Studio El Fann in the Lebanese Song Category, winning the title of best singer in the South of Lebanon, Beirut, and Mount Lebanon. Soon after, Fares signed a contract with Music Master Records and released her debut song titled "Ana Wel Shog" as part of her debut album, Myriam. The album achieved success, with multiple songs hitting the charts, including the song "La Tes'alni" which topped the charts for two months. The track "Ghamarni" was especially popular in Eastern Europe and was translated into more than four languages including Russian, Ukrainian, and Chechen. Following the album release, Fares started touring globally. She also launched her own fragrance line, featuring scents such as "Ana Wel Shog".

In 2005, Myriam released her second album titled "Nadini Myriam," in both Lebanese and Egyptian. The album consisted of 10 songs, including "Aanadiya," "Hasisni Beek," "Leih Habibi," "Maarafsh Had Bel Esmi Da," "Hasat Bi Aman," "Khalini Teer," "Zaalan Menni," "Nadini," "Haklik Rahtak," and "Waheshny Eah." From this album she filmed three music videos for the songs "Nadini," "Haklik Rahtak," and "Waheshny Eah." The music video for "Haklik Rahtak," was shot in Theatre Gymmase Marie Belle in Paris. The song "Nadini" charted for approximately two months. The music video for "Waheshny Eah," had a racing theme, with Fares performing some stunts along with a professional stunt driver. The song was translated into several languages, including Syriac, Turkish and Persian. She also launched her second fragrance line, called "Nadini".

Myriam has collaborated with a multitude of global brands. In 2007, she engaged in her successful collaboration with the globally renowned telecommunications company, "Vodafone Egypt", as she starred as the face of this company.

In 2008, Myriam released her highly anticipated first single in the Khaleeji dialect, accompanied by a music video titled "Moukanoh Wein." Myriam integrated the rich Eastern heritage of the Gulf Area with its modernity, presenting it to her generation. Following the success of her song, she embraced the concept of fusing civilizations and cultures through music, presenting a new approach. By blending tradition with modernity, Myriam not only appealed to a wide audience but also showed her artistic ability to create a unique musical experience. It garnered success in the Arab world and especially in the Gulf Area. Subsequently, in a concert in Kuwait in the largest festival of the Arab World, "Hala February", she was given the title "Queen of the Stage", which she is known for to this day.

=== 2007–2011: Bet'oul Eih, Silina and Min Oyouni ===
In 2007, Fares released the song titled "Moukanoh Wein" which served as the lead single from her third studio album Bet'oul Eih. The next year, she released music videos for the second and third singles "Mouch Ananiya" and "Eih Elly Byehsal" and the album was released in April 2008. She spent the year promoting the album and it became one of her most successful albums to date, she also released two more music video from the album that were "Ayyam El Sheety" and "Betrouh". In 2009, Myriam starred in the movie Silina.

=== 2018–present: Goumi, Myriam Fares: The Journey, and Tukoh Taka ===
Fares released Goumi in 2018, a song that encouraged girls to stand up and dance. Following a dance challenge that Fares launched on her Instagram, the song went viral around the world. To date, the "Goumi" challenge has surpassed over 10.2 billion views. Following the successes of "Goumi" and "Tukoh Taka," Fares garnered significant attention and was invited for numerous international interviews on television and in magazines. One notable interview was with Fox 5DC, where she discussed the meaning behind "Tukoh Takah" and her feelings about becoming an international singer.

In 2021, Netflix chose Fares as the first Arab artist to make a documentary film on her personal life. The documentary recounts experiences in Myriam's personal and professional life. Myriam Fares: The Journey was intentionally released during the COVID-19 pandemic. Since people all over the world were not able to connect socially, Fares wanted to share for the first time how she and her family coped with this situation. The documentary achieved great success revealing her personal life for the first time, from pregnancy and delivery to music and studio preparations. Immediately after its release, the documentary ranked number 1 for 2 weeks in the Arabic and International films category, as well as Netflix documentaries, and series, remaining in the top 10 list for 2 months. Myriam Fares: The Journey consistently ranked among the top searched titles on Netflix in the region, for the duration of its broadcast. Fares ended the documentary with a music video for her new release Ghaddara Ya Dounya.

In 2022, Fares was chosen by the FIFA panel to be the performing artist representing the Arab world for the official FIFA Fan Festival anthem of the Qatar World Cup. Alongside global artists Nicki Minaj and Maluma, she performed the song "Tukoh Taka." Fares played a significant role in the song's development: contributing to the arrangement, composing the Arabic part, and designing the choreography for the music video herself. Upon its release, "Tukoh Taka" quickly rose to the top of the music charts in both the region and the world. The song and its music video incorporated three different languages: English, Spanish, and Arabic. In the Arabic part, Fares aimed to send a message to promote peace in Arab countries, especially Lebanon. The music video was shot in Los Angeles. The FIFA Fan Festival's opening in Qatar witnessed an elaborate performance by Fares, featuring 50 dancers, 50 musicians, 400 costumes, 40 technicians and graphics. The performance elevated Fares' career beyond the Arab region, establishing her as an international artist. The song kept trending at number 1 for three weeks on "Trending For" Music and two weeks on "Global Music Videos".

== Personal life ==
Fares married Lebanese-American businessman Danny Mitri in a Cyprus ceremony in August 2014. They have two sons born in February 2016 and October 2020. In an interview with Nishan, she stated that she is a supporter of civil marriage and is not against interfaith relationships.

== Discography ==
=== Studio albums ===
- Myriam (2003)
- Nadini (2005)
- Bet'oul Eih (2008)
- Min Oyouni (2011)
- Aman (2015)

=== Singles ===
List of singles as lead artist, with selected chart positions, showing year released and album name
Title	Year	Peak chart positions	Album
Title	Year	LBN	Album
"Ana Wel Shoq"	2003	—	Myriam
"La Tes'alni"	2003	—	Myriam
"Ahebak Heal"	2003	—	Myriam
"Nadini"	2005	—	Nadini
"Haklik Rahtak"	2005	—	Nadini
"Waheshny Eah"	2005	—	Nadini
"Moukanoh Wein"	2007	—	Bet'oul Eih
"Mouch Ananiya"	2008	—	Bet'oul Eih
"Ayyam EL Sheety"	2008	—	Bet'oul Eih
"Betrouh"	2008	—	Bet'oul Eih
"Eh Elli Behsal"	2008	—	Bet'oul Eih
"Lala Yaba Lala"	2010	—	Non-album single
"Min Oyouni"	2010	15	Min Oyouni
"Khalani"	2011	—	Min Oyouni
"El Gasayed"	2011	—	Min Oyouni
"Chou Bheb"	2012	1	Aman
"Ana Gheir"	2012	—	Aman
"Halla Halla Ya Sabaya"	2013	—	Aman
"Kifak Enta"	2013	2	Aman
"Deggou El Toboul"	2014	—	Aman
"Nifsi Aoulhalak"	2015	1	Aman
"Aman"	2015	—	Aman
"Chouf Halak Aalayi"	2017	2	Non-album singles
"Goumi"	2018	2	Non-album singles
"Habibi Saudi"	2019	—	Non-album singles
"Zahra (Hala Helwa)" (with Asser Yassin)	2021	—	Non-album singles
"Ghaddara Ya Dounya"	2021	10	TBA
"Maalesh"	2022	3	TBA
"Hatha El Helo"	2022	9	Non-album single
"Zahra (Lesa Hala Helwa)" (with Ahmed Hatem and Abu)	2022	—	Non-album single
"Adiha Enbisat"	2022	1	TBA
"Tukoh Taka" (with Nicki Minaj and Maluma)	2022	1	FIFA World Cup 2022™ Official Soundtrack
"North Coast" (with Mohamed Mounir)	2023	1	Non-album single
"Tezalzelha"	2023	1	TBA
"—" denotes a recording that did not chart or was not released in that territory.

=== Other charted songs ===
List of singles as lead artist, with selected chart positions, showing year released and album name
Title	Year	Peak chart positions	Album
Title	Year	LBN	Album
"Artah"	2011	11	Min Oyouni
"Bizemmetak"	2015	1	Aman
"Ghafi"	2015	4	Aman
"—" denotes a recording that did not chart or was not released in that territory.

== Filmography ==
- 2009: Silina (Movie)
- 2010: Fawazeer Myriam Fares (TV program)
- 2014: Itiham (TV series)
- 2021: Myriam Fares : The Journey (Netflix documentary)

== Awards ==
In the 2023 Murex D'or Awards in Lebanon, Fares was awarded the "First Lebanese International Star".
