= The Real Me (Future album) =

Studio album by Future
- Released: July 10, 2026
- Genres: Trap; hip-hop
- Length: 58:56
- Labels: Freebandz; Epic
- Producers: ATL Jacob; AyeTM; BabyWave; C$D Sid; Dez Wright; DJ Spinz; Dre Moon; D. Rich; FnZ; Inferno; Juke Wong; Krazymob; MikeWavvs; Sean Momberger; MTYMusic; Allen Ritter; RushDee; Shndo; SimmyAuto; Smatt; Southside; Taurus; Test; TM88; Wheezy; Will-a-Fool; Pharrell Williams

Future chronology
Mixtape Pluto (2024)	The Real Me (2026)

Singles from The Real Me
- 1. "Radio" Released: June 26, 2026; 2. "California Girls" Released: July 21, 2026; 3. "Konnichiwa" Released: September 29, 2026

The Real Me is the tenth studio album by American rapper Future. Released on July 10, 2026, through Freebandz and Epic, it is Future's first solo studio album in four years, following I Never Liked You (2022), and his first full-length solo project since Mixtape Pluto (2024). The album was produced by Allen Ritter, ATL Jacob, DJ Spinz, Dre Moon, FnZ, Pharrell Williams, RushDee, Sean Momberger, Southside, TM88, and Wheezy, among others. Similarly to his last project, Mixtape Pluto, it contains no features.

The lead single "Radio" was released on June 26, 2026. "California Girls" was sent to rhythmic contemporary radio on July 21, 2026, as the second single, followed by "Konnichiwa" as the third single.

== Background ==
The Real Me is Future's first solo album since his back-to-back collaborative albums with Metro Boomin, We Don't Trust You (2024) and We Still Don't Trust You (2024), which both debuted at number one on the Billboard 200. The album also marks his first release since the death of his longtime friend and collaborator Young Scooter in 2025. In March 2026, Future announced via social media that he was in "album mode".

Future first teased the project in January 2026, asking fans on his Instagram Story to help name his forthcoming album. In an Instagram Story posted on July 1, 2026, Future discussed the album's title over dinner with a companion, explaining that he wanted listeners to understand his acceptance of unconditional love despite his lifestyle, and that he felt he could finally be candid about who he is.

Ahead of the album, Future had a busy year: in early 2026 he appeared on J. Cole's The Fall-Off, reunited with Drake on the latter's Iceman track "Ran to Atlanta", which peaked at number two on the Billboard Hot 100, and joined Tyla for the song "Game Time" from the official 2026 FIFA World Cup album, which the pair performed live at the tournament's United States opening ceremony at SoFi Stadium on June 12, 2026, alongside performances by Lisa, Anitta, and Rema. He also reunited with DJ Khaled and Lil Baby in April 2026 for "One of Them", which entered the Hot 100 at number 70 and appeared on Khaled's album Aalam of God.

== Release and promotion ==
The album was announced alongside a Spotify promotional campaign featuring artwork of the title in blotted black ink on a red background; billboards initially displayed only the acronym "T.R.M.", prompting speculation among fans about the project's identity before Future confirmed the title.

On June 25, 2026, the release date for the album was announced as July 10, alongside the first single and eleventh track, "Radio", released the following day. In promoting the release, Future described the project on social media as the "album of the century".

Two days ahead of release, on July 8, 2026, Future unveiled the official cover art and full track list. The artwork depicts Future shirtless with bleach-blonde twists against a black backdrop. Accompanying the reveal, Future posted a since-clarified message asking fans to guess who was featured on the album, though the LP ultimately contains no guest appearances.

== Critical reception ==
Professional ratings
Aggregate scores
Source	Rating
Metacritic	62/100
Review scores
Source	Rating
AllMusic	3.5/5 stars
Consequence	C+
Pitchfork	5.9/10
Rolling Stone	3/5 stars
Slant	3.5/5 stars

According to the review aggregator Metacritic, The Real Me received "generally favorable reviews" based on a weighted average score of 62 out of 100 from four critic scores.

In a C+ review for Consequence, Kiana Fitzgerald wrote that despite Future opening the album with signals suggesting a newly introspective approach, including a clip of comedian Afroman and commentary from André 3000, the project largely finds Future returning to familiar territory rather than offering genuine self-examination. The reviewer found that Future largely avoids introspection, sticking to a well-worn commercial mode rather than revealing something new about himself. Fitzgerald also questioned Future's credibility around the album's confessional premise, pointing to his history of downplaying past collaborations and controversies.

Writing for Stereogum, Tom Breihan similarly noted that despite the absence of features being an unusual move for one of rap's most prolific collaborators, the album mostly sounds consistent with Future's established style rather than marking a dramatic departure. Breihan highlighted several production detours, including a synth-funk-influenced "If I Could", a Weeknd-indebted synth-pop turn on "Hollywood", a squeaking, altered-voice performance on "2018", and a Pharrell Williams-produced closer, "Alice", that draws on early-1990s house music.

Reviewing the album for Shatter the Standards, a writer under the byline Phil gave the album three and a half out of five stars, calling it "Solid" and noting that Future delivers some of his sharpest writing since the 2010s in patches, particularly on "Radio," "If I Could," and "Big Moment," which were cited as favorite tracks.

Billboard ranked all twenty-two tracks on the album, placing "If I Could" at number one and the Dre Moon-produced "Cast a Spell" last, with critic Armon Sadler noting that the closing track's higher vocal register felt mismatched with the beat. In a separate ranking of Future's full studio discography, Billboard placed The Real Me twelfth out of his twelve albums (including his two collaborative projects with Metro Boomin), writing that stretches of the project drag in the absence of outside collaborators, while still praising individual moments such as the nursery-rhyme-interpolating flow on "One Two", the character-building "Build a Bitch", and the pitched-up "King's Dead"-style delivery on "2018".

== Commercial performance ==
According to Luminate data reported by Billboard, the album earned 131 ,000 album-equivalent units in its first week in the United States, comprising 13 thousand album sales, 118 thousand streaming-equivalent albums (from 120.29 million on-demand official streams), and "a negligible sum" of track-equivalent albums. It debuted at number one on the Billboard 200, making it Future's twelfth album to do so, and making Future the artist with the fifth-most number-one albums on the chart at the time, surpassing Eminem (eleven) while being behind Jay-Z (fourteen), Drake (fifteen), Taylor Swift (fifteen), and the Beatles (nineteen). The album also debuted at number nine on Top Album Sales and number one on Top Streaming Albums. Seventeen of the album's twenty-two tracks appeared on the Billboard Hot 100 following the album's release.

According to Hits data, the album earned 131,367 album-equivalent units in its first week in the United States, comprising 14,249 album sales, 116,819 streaming-equivalent albums, and 299 track-equivalent albums.

== Track listing ==
The Real Me track listing
No.	Title	Writer(s)	Producer(s)	Length
1.	"Fukk a Interview"	Nayvadius Wilburn; Wesley Glass; Jacob Canady; Michael Mulé; Isaac De Boni	Wheezy; FnZ; ATL Jacob; Caleb Bryant	2:37
2.	"One Two"	Wilburn; Matthew-Kyle Brown; Asim Dowell; Charles Bernstein	Smatt Sertified; SimmyAuto	1:59
3.	"No Misery"	Wilburn; Jason Boyd; W. Glass; Luis Martinez	Wheezy; Shndo; Bryan Yepes	2:48
4.	"California Girls"	Wilburn; Boyd; Farra Blake; Thomas Moore; Joel Montgomery	AyeTM; Test	2:29
5.	"Tank Top Pluto"	Wilburn; Dwan Avery; Jonny; TP	KrazyMob	1:50
6.	"Weight Up"	Wilburn; Bryan Simmons; Sidney Tapaquon; Roman Mironchenko; Kondo; Inferno; Dennis Lambert; Brian Potter	TM88; C$D Sid; Swamiq; Kondo; Inferno	2:54
7.	"Konnichiwa"	Wilburn; W. Glass; Canady; RushDee Williams; Michael Bailey	Wheezy; ATL Jacob; RushDee; Mikewavvs	2:33
8.	"Trench Coat"	Wilburn; Canady	ATL Jacob	1:46
9.	"Snow in Skyami"	Wilburn; W. Glass; Taurus Currie	Wheezy; Taurus; Mtymusic	2:42
10.	"Build a Bitch"	Wilburn; Boyd; Blake; Montgomery; Andre Proctor; Allen Ritter	Dre Moon; Ritter	2:43
11.	"Radio"	Wilburn; W. Glass; Dylan Cleary; Currie; Justin Glass	Wheezy; Dez Wright; Taurus; BabyWave	2:40
12.	"2018"	Wilburn; Gary Hill	DJ Spinz	3:43
13.	"Money Over Everything"	Wilburn; Canady	ATL Jacob	2:14
14.	"Off the Hinge"	Wilburn; W. Glass; Joshua Luellen	Wheezy; Southside	2:51
15.	"If I Could"	Wilburn; Avery; Cedric Jobe	KrazyMob	3:11
16.	"Big Moment"	Wilburn; W. Glass; Luellen; Lucas DePante	Wheezy; Southside; Juke Wong	3:15
17.	"Cast a Spell"	Wilburn; Proctor	Dre Moon	3:27
18.	"Kick"	Wilburn; W. Glass; Sean Momberger; Dwayne Richardson	Wheezy; Momberger; D. Rich	2:15
19.	"Hollywood"	Wilburn; W. Glass; Luellen; Momberger; Sarah Jane Wood; Ben Laver	Wheezy; Southside; Momberger	2:59
20.	"Feeling I Give"	Wilburn; Canady	ATL Jacob	2:36
21.	"Alice"	Wilburn; Boyd; Pharrell Williams	Williams	2:51
22.	"Eye to Eye"	Wilburn; Willie Byrd	Will A Fool	2:24
Total length:				58:56

Sample credits

- "One Two" contains a sample of the soundtrack from A Nightmare on Elm Street, composed by Charles Bernstein.
- "Weight Up" contains a sample of "The Bottom Line", written by Dennis Lambert and Brian Potter, and performed by Glen Campbell.
- "Hollywood" contains a sample of "Winter Sun", written by Sarah Jane Wood and Ben Laver, and performed by Juniper Vale and Ah. BLOOM.
- The songs "2018" and "Money Over Everything" were replaced with the songs "Match My Speed" and "Pluto's Ballad" on early physical CDs. Early CDs also did not include the song "Eye to Eye".
- Early physical vinyls also have a shortened 13-song tracklist with the same first 13 songs as the CDs, but have none of the rest of the album.

== Personnel ==
These credits have been adapted from Spotify and Tidal.

- Sven Grummel – engineering assistance (tracks 1, 20, 22)
- Joe LaPorta – mastering (all tracks)
- Miguel "Wav Surgeon" Correa – mixing (tracks 1–3, 5–6, 8–10, 13–22); recording (tracks 1–7, 9–11, 13–21)
- Dylan Spence – engineering assistance (tracks 2, 9, 15–16, 19)
- James Dunn – engineering assistance (tracks 2, 9, 15–16, 19)
- Ethan Stevens – mixing (tracks 2–3, 5, 7–9, 11, 14–16, 18)
- Francesco Di Giovanni – engineering assistance (tracks 4, 6, 10, 12–13, 17, 19–20, 22)
- Ramiro Fernandez-Seoane – engineering assistance (tracks 4, 6, 10, 12–13, 17, 19–20, 22)
- Manny Marroquin – mixing (tracks 4, 6, 10, 12–13, 17, 19–22)
- Joel Olivier Vaval – engineering assistance (track 5)
- Marvin Henri – engineering assistance (track 7)
- Eric Manco – recording (tracks 8, 12–13, 22)
- Poo Bear – background vocals (tracks 10, 14)
- Mike Larson – mixing, programming, recording (track 21)
- Pharrell Williams – mixing (track 21)
- Benjamin Thomas – recording (track 21)

== Charts ==
Chart performance for The Real Me
Chart (2026)	Peak position
Australian Albums (ARIA)	23
Australian Hip Hop/R&B Albums (ARIA)	2
Austrian Albums (Ö3 Austria)	11
Belgian Albums (Ultratop Flanders)	43
Belgian Albums (Ultratop Wallonia)	35
Canadian Albums (Billboard)	6
Czech Albums (ČNS IFPI)	18
Danish Albums (Hitlisten)	23
Dutch Albums (Album Top 100)	12
French Albums (SNEP)	26
German Albums (Offizielle Top 100)	20
German Hip-Hop Albums (Offizielle Top 100)	4
Hungarian Albums (MAHASZ)	15
Irish Albums (IRMA)	58
Italian Albums (FIMI)	50
Japanese Hot Albums (Billboard Japan)	96
Lithuanian Albums (AGATA)	14
New Zealand Albums (RMNZ)	10
Nigerian Albums (TurnTable)	8
Norwegian Albums (IFPI Norge)	30
Polish Albums (ZPAV)	77
Portuguese Albums (AFP)	17
Scottish Albums (Official Charts)	58
Slovak Albums (ČNS IFPI)	6
Swedish Hip-Hop Albums (Sverigetopplistan)	18
Swiss Albums (Schweizer Hitparade)	4
UK Albums (Official Charts)	27
UK R&B Albums (Official Charts)	1
US Billboard 200	1
US Top R&B/Hip-Hop Albums (Billboard)	1
