= Lighter (Jelly Roll and Carín León song) =

Single by Jelly Roll and Carín León

from the album Official FIFA World Cup 2026 Album
- Language: English; Spanish
- Released: March 20, 2026
- Genre: Pop; rock; country
- Length: 2:59
- Label: Universal Music
- Composers: Jason DeFord; Jon Randall; Jessi Alexander; Jessie Jo Dillon; Manuel Lorente; Édgar Barrera; Daniel Rondón
- Lyricists: Jason DeFord; Óscar Díaz de León
- Producer: Cirkut

Jelly Roll singles chronology
"Amen" (2025)	"Lighter" (2026)	"Hands Up" (2026)

Carín León singles chronology
"Love to Be Loved" (2026)	"Lighter" (2026)

2026 FIFA World Cup singles chronology
"Lighter" (2026)	"Por Ella" (2026)

Music video
- "Lighter" on YouTube

"Lighter" is a song by American singer Jelly Roll and Mexican singer Carín León. It is the first single from the official album of the 2026 FIFA World Cup. The track was produced by Canadian producer Cirkut and was released on March 20, 2026.

"Lighter" is a pop and rock song with country influences. The song was met with heavy critical outrage from fans and reviewers and failed to chart on major music charts. The song was largely sidelined following the promotion of "Dai Dai" and "World Cup (Champions)" as the major single releases ahead of the tournament and "DNA (More Than a Game)" as the official anthem.

== Critical reception ==
The song has faced heavy criticism, mockery and backlash and was universally panned by both fans and critics, with it being compared to music seen in car commercials.

Brent Keough of The Conversation criticized the song's heavy religious theming, a hallmark of Jelly Roll's works, stating "[you] could be forgiven for questioning whether this song was about football at all, or whether it is more reflective of Jelly Roll’s own personal conversion story".

The release of "Lighter" as the first single from the official World Cup album was a source of confusion, with many falsely assuming that it was the tournament's official song or anthem; "Dai Dai" by Shakira and Burna Boy was released as the official song of the tournament in May 2026, followed by David Guetta's "DNA (More Than a Game)" as the "official anthem" in June.

== Credits and personnel ==
- Jelly Roll – lyrics, composition, vocals
- Carín León – lyrics, composition, vocals
- Cirkut – composition, production, arrangement, background vocals

== Charts ==
Chart performance
Chart (2026)	Peak position
Czech Republic Airplay (ČNS IFPI)	4
Ecuador Anglo Airplay (Monitor Latino)	9
El Salvador Anglo Airplay (Monitor Latino)	5
Honduras Anglo Airplay (Monitor Latino)	3
Nicaragua Anglo Airplay (Monitor Latino)	5

== See also ==
- List of FIFA World Cup songs and anthems
