= Ya Hit =

2026 single by Future featuring Drake, Travis Scott, and Loe Shimmy

Single by Future featuring Drake, Travis Scott, and Loe Shimmy

from the album Infinity
- Released: November 6, 2026
- Genre: Trap
- Length: 3:34
- Label: Epic
- Producer: ATL Jacob

Future singles chronology
"Radio" (2026)	"Ya Hit" (2026)

Music video
- "Ya Hit" on YouTube

"Ya Hit" is a song by American rapper Future featuring Drake, Travis Scott, and Loe Shimmy. Future dropped it on November 6, 2026, as the lead single from his next album, with production by ATL Jacob and ad-libs from Sexyy Red. The song was previewed at Drake's 40th birthday party with only Future, Scott, and Loe Shimmy on it, and Drake later jumped on it. Drake and Scott had not landed on a song together since "Meltdown" (2023). The song drew divided reactions.

== Background ==
Drake and Future's relationship soured in 2024 after Future and Metro Boomin released We Don't Trust You. The album took several veiled shots at Drake and included the single "Like That", on which Kendrick Lamar ripped into Drake and launched a feud. Earlier in 2026, Drake and Future came together on "Ran to Atlanta", from Drake's album Iceman. The Fader wrote that Drake and Scott had seemingly been at odds since Scott encouraged Future and Metro Boomin to play "Like That" on stage at Rolling Loud. Days before "Ya Hit", the two appeared together in Houston, including at Kanye West's concert, which surprised fans.

Loe Shimmy is a Florida rapper who had already worked with Drake. He appeared on "I'm Spent", a track from Drake's 2026 album Habibti. The two filmed a music video for it in Toronto, dressed up as Iron Man, which debuted as part of Drake's short film FOMO. "I'm Spent" reached number 34 on the Billboard Hot 100, becoming his first top-40 entry. His album Pretty Girlz Run the World arrived a few weeks after Habibti.

== Composition and lyrics ==
"Ya Hit" is a trap song. ATL Jacob produced it, and Mike Dean is credited as its mastering engineer. The Fader said the production is built on enormous distorted synths and thumping 808s, and Rolling Stone wrote that the opening could soundtrack the beginning of a battle sequence in a film. The four rappers trade verses. Loe Shimmy leads the chorus, and Sexyy Red ad-libs over Drake's verse.

The Fader described the lyrics as straight contempt, aimed at rappers with unimpressive label advances and at women who might see a gifted Hermès bag or G-Wagon taken back after acting out. It added that a playful streak softens the song and that Scott shouts out the video game Grand Theft Auto VI. In his verse, Future raps about taking back a car from a woman and tells her to find a new "daddy". In his second verse, Drake raps to an unspecified target that their album is done and they should submit it. HotNewHipHop called the line too broad to pin on one person and suggested it could apply to A$AP Rocky or Jay-Z, while some fans brought up Lamar or DJ Khaled.

== Release and promotion ==
The song was previewed at a party in New York City for Drake's 40th birthday in October 2026, when it featured Loe Shimmy, Future, and Scott. Drake was reportedly such a fan of it that he jumped on it afterward. Loe Shimmy debuted a snippet on November 5. DJ Akademiks confirmed that Drake would appear on the song but said he did not have a verse when it was previewed. Future announced the song on Instagram earlier that week and referred to the collaborators as the Avengers in the caption. He also hinted at new music on X, writing "Bringin the static back #INFINITY". Jim Joe & Lewy created the cover art.

"Ya Hit" was released for digital download and streaming through Epic Records on November 6, 2026. HotNewHipHop, citing the account Kurrco, reported that it is the lead single from Future's follow-up to The Real Me, reportedly titled Infinity.

== Reception ==
Vivian Medithi of The Fader wrote that "Ya Hit" feels almost anachronistic, since posse cuts like it were routine on major-label rap albums in the late 2010s and early 2020s before they fell out of favor. She attributed that to the economics of splitting streams. She wrote that the song signals a return to business as usual for hip-hop's A-listers and continues a 2026 trend of big stars finding inspiration in rising ones.

HotNewHipHop reported that fans questioned and scolded the song as well as praised it. Some loved the star-powered link-up and called it a return to form for blockbuster rap, while others found it formulaic or forced. Fans also speculated about whether Drake and Future were really on good terms, pointing to videos of the collaborators together in which the two stood apart.

== Charts ==
Chart performance for "Ya Hit"
Chart (2026)	Peak position
Canada Hot 100 (Billboard)	23
Global 200 (Billboard)	83
New Zealand Hot Singles (RMNZ)	4
South Africa Streaming (TOSAC)	16
UK Singles (Official Charts)	83
US Billboard Hot 100	38
US Hot R&B/Hip-Hop Songs (Billboard)	5
US R&B/Hip-Hop Airplay (Billboard)	48
