= Agua (Maluma and Shakira song) =

Single by Maluma and Shakira
- Language: Spanish
- English title: "Water"
- Released: 18 September 2026
- Genre: Tropical; merengue
- Length: 3:11
- Label: Paris LG; Sony Latin
- Songwriters: Shakira Mebarak; Juan Luis Londoño Arias; Alejandro Ramirez Suarez; Yon Mad; Yan Mad; Polo Parra; Alexander Castillo; Martín Rodríguez Vicente
- Producers: MadMusick; Sky Rompiendo; Polo Parra; Cromo X; Yon Mad; Yan Mad; Maluma

Maluma singles chronology
"Las Meningitis (Remix)" (2026)	"Agua" (2026)

Shakira singles chronology
"Dai Dai" (2026)	"Agua" (2026)

Music video
- "Agua" on YouTube

"Agua" (lit. 'Water') is a tropical merengue song by Colombian singers Maluma and Shakira. It was released on 18 September 2026, through Paris LG and Sony Music Latin.

== Background and release ==
The collaboration was announced on 9 September 2026 by Maluma. The song was written by the artists themself with Sky Rompiendo, Yon Mad, Yan Mad, Polo Parra, Alexander Castillo and Martín Rodríguez Vicente. The song marks the fifth collaboration between the two artists, coming ten years after their first collaborations, "La Bicicleta (Remix)" and "Chantaje" in 2016, and their first since "Trap" and "Clandestino" in 2018. The song was released on 18 September 2026, with Maluma celebrating the release with the words "Nos fuimos mundial con la reina" (We went global with the queen) on social media.

== Composition ==
"Agua" is a sensual merengue song. It is produced with a contemporary tropical edge, blending Caribbean-rooted rhythms with sleek pop production. It features Maluma’s playful, confident verses, which add a layer of flirtation, alongside Shakira’s distinctive vocals that bring both sensuality and command to the song. The lyrics use water and thirst to show heavy craving, with the duo singing that their connection can either ignite or extinguish a fire between them: "Porque cuando me miras se hace agua la boca / Calmá’ mi sed desde que estás aquí" (Because when you look at me, my mouth waters / You’ve quenched my thirst since you’ve been here).

== Reception ==
LatiNation describes "Agua" as a vibrant and catchy song that masterfully avoids repetitive formulas for a fresh, modern musical style built around an irresistible metaphor of thirst and fire. Billboard notes that the track succeeds by blending Maluma’s playful, confident verses with Shakira's unmistakable vocal command and sensuality.

== Accolades ==
"AGUA"
Year	Ceremony	Award	Result	Ref.
2026	Los 40 Music Awards	Mejor Video Musical	Pending	

== Music video ==
The music video for the song, directed by Hannah Lux Davis, was released alongside the single through the singers' YouTube channel. Featuring a cantine-style setting, the visual creates a polished, tropical atmosphere centered around the song's theme of water. Liquid surfaces, reflections, glowing lights and smooth choreography of the video highlight the strong chemistry and natural attraction between Shakira and Maluma.

== Charts ==
=== Weekly charts ===
Weekly chart performance
Chart (2026)	Peak position
Argentina Hot 100 (Billboard)	3
Argentina Airplay (Monitor Latino)	1
Bolivia Airplay (Monitor Latino)	3
Central America Airplay (Monitor Latino)	11
Chile Airplay (Monitor Latino)	4
Colombia Hot 100 (Billboard)	3
Colombia Airplay (National-Report)	2
Colombia Airplay (Monitor Latino)	1
CIS Airplay (TopHit)	193
Costa Rica Airplay (Monitor Latino)	9
Croatia International Airplay (Top lista)	90
Ecuador Airplay (Monitor Latino)	12
El Salvador Airplay (ASAP EGC)	2
Guatemala Airplay (Monitor Latino)	13
Israel TV Airplay (Media Forest)	4
Italy Airplay (EarOne)	60
Italy Latin Airplay (EarOne)	2
Kazakhstan Airplay (TopHit)	155
Lithuania Airplay (TopHit)	24
Nicaragua Airplay (Monitor Latino)	15
North Macedonia Airplay (Radiomonitor)	3
Panama International (PRODUCE)	14
Panama Airplay (Monitor Latino)	9
Peru Airplay (Monitor Latino)	11
Puerto Rico Airplay (Monitor Latino)	2
Romania Airplay (Media Forest)	7
San Marino Airplay (SMRTV Top 50)	46
Spain (Promusicae)	12
Spain Airplay (Promusicae)	8
Suriname (Nationale Top 40)	23
Uruguay Airplay (Monitor Latino)	1
US Hot Latin Songs (Billboard)	17
US Hot Tropical Songs (Billboard)	3
US Tropical Airplay (Billboard)	1
Venezuela Airplay (Record Report)	13
Venezuela Airplay (Monitor Latino)	8

=== Monthly charts ===
Monthly chart performance
Chart (2026)	Peak position
Lithuania Airplay (TopHit)	32
Romania Airplay (TopHit)	44

== Release history ==
Release history for "Agua"
Region	Date	Format	Label	Ref.
Various	18 September 2026	Digital download; streaming	Sony	
Italy	25 September 2026	Radio airplay	Sony	
