= List of Dutch Top 40 number-one singles of 2026 =

This is a list of the Dutch Top 40 number-one singles of 2026. The Dutch Top 40 is a chart that ranks the best-performing singles of the Netherlands. It is published every week by radio station Qmusic.

== Chart history ==
List of Dutch Top 40 number-one singles of 2026
| Issue date | Song | Artist(s) | Ref. |
|---|---|---|---|
| 3 January | "The Fate of Ophelia" | Taylor Swift | |
| 10 January | "The Fate of Ophelia" | Taylor Swift | |
| 17 January | "The Fate of Ophelia" | Taylor Swift | |
| 24 January | "I Just Might" | Bruno Mars | |
| 31 January | "I Just Might" | Bruno Mars | |
| 7 February | "I Just Might" | Bruno Mars | |
| 14 February | "I Just Might" | Bruno Mars | |
| 21 February | "I Just Might" | Bruno Mars | |
| 28 February | "I Just Might" | Bruno Mars | |
| 7 March | "I Just Might" | Bruno Mars | |
| 14 March | "I Just Might" | Bruno Mars | |
| 21 March | "I Just Might" | Bruno Mars | |
| 28 March | "I Just Might" | Bruno Mars | |
| 4 April | "I Just Might" | Bruno Mars | |
| 11 April | "Fever Dream" | Alex Warren | |
| 18 April | "Fever Dream" | Alex Warren | |
| 25 April | "Fever Dream" | Alex Warren | |
| 2 May | "Fever Dream" | Alex Warren | |
| 9 May | "Fever Dream" | Alex Warren | |
| 16 May | "Fever Dream" | Alex Warren | |
| 23 May | "Fever Dream" | Alex Warren | |
| 30 May | "Cheerio" | Justen de Wildt | |
| 6 June | "Cheerio" | Justen de Wildt | |
| 13 June | "Cheerio" | Justen de Wildt | |
| 20 June | "Cheerio" | Justen de Wildt | |
| 27 June | "Dai Dai" | Shakira and Burna Boy | |
| 4 July | "Dai Dai" | Shakira and Burna Boy | |
| 11 July | "Dai Dai" | Shakira and Burna Boy | |
| 18 July | "Dai Dai" | Shakira and Burna Boy | |
| 25 July | "Dai Dai" | Shakira and Burna Boy | |
| 1 August | "Dai Dai" | Shakira and Burna Boy | |
| 8 August | "Dai Dai" | Shakira and Burna Boy | |
| 15 August | "Dai Dai" | Shakira and Burna Boy | |
| 22 August | "Dai Dai" | Shakira and Burna Boy | |
| 29 August | "Dai Dai" | Shakira and Burna Boy | |
| 5 September | "Dai Dai" | Shakira and Burna Boy | |
| 12 September | "Dai Dai" | Shakira and Burna Boy | |
| 19 September | "Dai Dai" | Shakira and Burna Boy | |
| 26 September | "Dai Dai" | Shakira and Burna Boy | |
| 3 October | "Dai Dai" | Shakira and Burna Boy | |
| 10 October | "Pijnstiller" | Suzan & Freek | |
| 17 October | "Pijnstiller" | Suzan & Freek | |
| 24 October | "Mi Chico" | DJ Goja | |
| 31 October | "Mi Chico" | DJ Goja | |
| 7 November | "Babydoll" | Jamie Miller | |
| 14 November | "Babydoll" | Jamie Miller | |
| 21 November | "Babydoll" | Jamie Miller | |

== Number-one artists ==
| Position | Artist | Weeks No. 1 |
|---|---|---|
| 1 | Shakira | 15 |
| 1 | Burna Boy | 15 |
| 2 | Bruno Mars | 11 |
| 3 | Alex Warren | 7 |
| 4 | Justen de Wildt | 4 |
| 5 | Taylor Swift | 3 |
| 5 | Jamie Miller | 3 |
| 6 | Suzan & Freek | 2 |
| 6 | DJ Goja | 2 |

== See also ==
- 2026 in music
