= 2026 FIFA World Cup opening ceremonies =

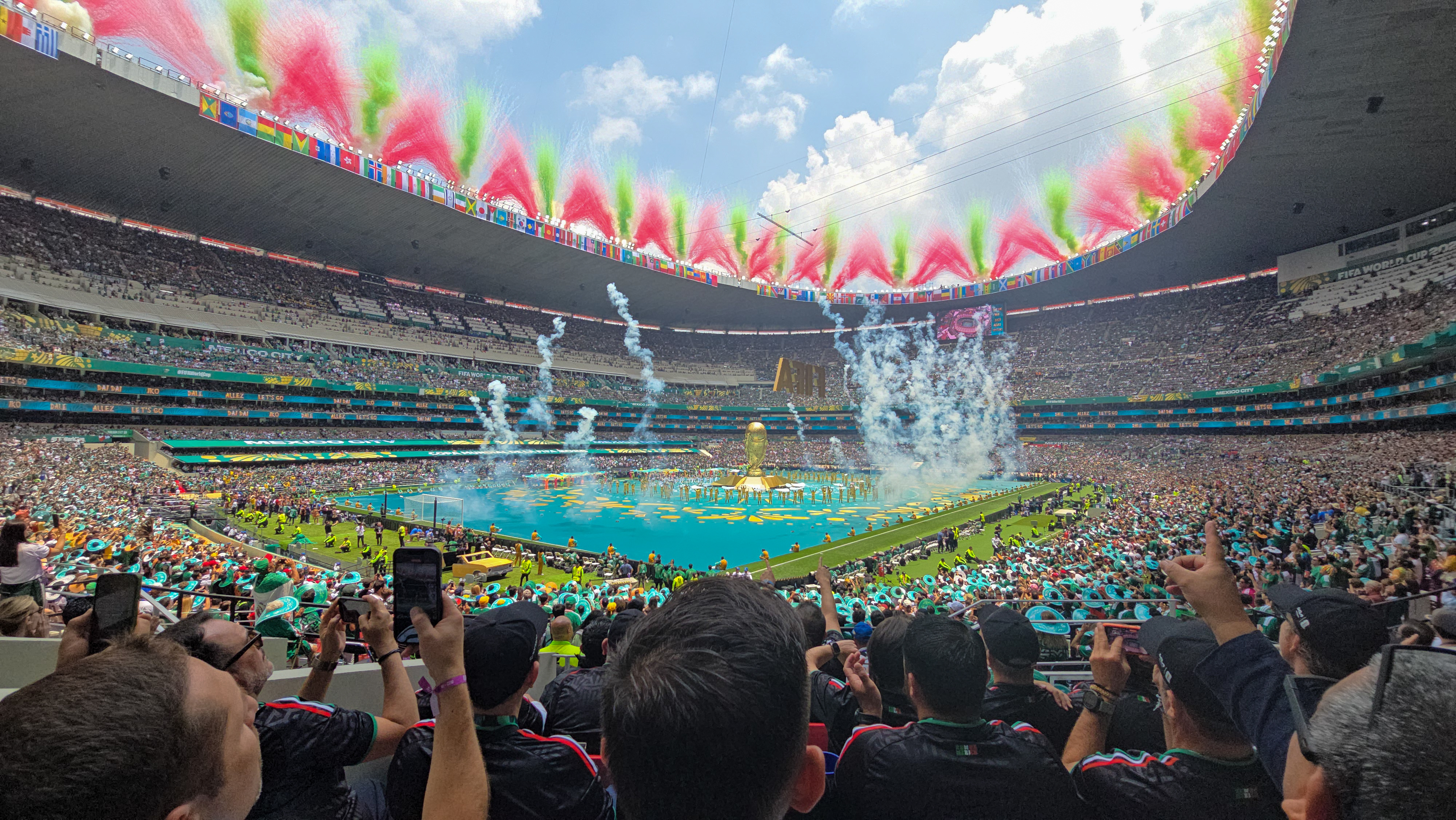
- Opening ceremony for Mexico at Estadio Azteca
- Date: June 11, 2026 and June 12, 2026
- Time: 12:30 PM CT (UTC–6) (Mexico; 11th); 1:30 PM ET (UTC–4) (Canada; 12th); 4:30 PM PT (UTC–7) (United States; 12th)
- Location: Los Angeles Stadium for the United States Mexico City Stadium for Mexico Toronto Stadium for Canada

The 2026 FIFA World Cup opening ceremonies took place in three parts, one for each host nation (the United States, Mexico, and Canada) of the 2026 FIFA World Cup hosting their respective opening match on June 11 and 12, 2026.

The Mexican opening ceremony was the first and main ceremony featuring the flag parade and the performance of the official World Cup song "Dai Dai" by Shakira and Burna Boy, and took place on Thursday, June 11, 2026 at the Mexico City Stadium in Mexico City ahead of the opening match of the tournament. The Canadian and American opening ceremonies took place at Toronto Stadium, Toronto and Los Angeles Stadium, Los Angeles on Friday, June 12, 2026 respectively.

The ceremonies were produced by Italian creative director Marco Balich, with each capturing aspects of the host country's history and culture.

== Opening ceremony in Mexico ==
The ceremony in Mexico lasted around fifteen minutes and began with a showcase of indigenous Mexican dancers in various clothing as well as dancers dressed in silver and gold surrounding an inflated version of the World Cup trophy with Mexican motifs as messages of unity and diversity were announced. Following the opening, Maná performed "Oye Mi Amor" with the indigenous dancers surrounding the stage. Afterwards, Danny Ocean performed "Partidazo" surrounded by female dancers dressed in china poblana dresses. This was followed by Los Ángeles Azules and Belinda performing "Por Ella" surrounded by male dancers dressed in charro outfits and performing a stylized version of the jarabe with the female dancers. Two Labubus appeared holding a plush of the World Cup trophy followed by J Balvin and Ryan Castro performing a medley of songs including "Qué Calor", "Una a la Vez", and "I Like It", surrounded by dancers in suits matching the color scheme of the tournament. Shakira and Burna Boy closed the opening ceremony with a performance of the tournament's official song "Dai Dai" followed by flairs in the colors of the Mexican flag and a fireworks display. The ceremony was followed by the flag ceremony where all 48 flags of the participating teams were displayed and their names were announced in both English and Spanish. Andrea Bocelli and Ejae then performed the tournament's official anthem "DNA (More Than a Game)". After that, Tyla performed the national anthem of South Africa while Alejandro Fernández sang the Mexican national anthem.

=== Songs ===
- "Oye Mi Amor" – Maná
- "Partidazo" – Danny Ocean
- "Por Ella" – Los Ángeles Azules and Belinda
- "Qué Calor" / "Una a la Vez" / "I Like It" – J Balvin and Ryan Castro
- "Dai Dai" – Shakira and Burna Boy
- "DNA (More Than a Game)" – Andrea Bocelli and Ejae

== Opening ceremony in Canada ==
The ceremony in Canada lasted around fifteen minutes and began with William Prince delivering a land acknowledgement as well as a welcome message highlighting the bridge between Indigenous Canadians and the diversity of Canadians followed with a performance of Indigenous Canadians dancers. Afterwards, Alessia Cara performed a medley of "Wild Things" and "Fire" as dancers with maple leaf mosaics as well as a stylized moose, polar bear, and humpback whale surrounded the stage to highlight animals native to Canada. This was followed by Nora Fatehi, Vegedream, and Sanjoy performing "Siir Siir" and Jessie Reyez and Elyanna performing "Illuminate" as the inflated trophy with Canadian motifs was raised while falling apart and additional dancers in red and white outfits surrounded the stage. Following this, the flag ceremony took place where the flags of all 48 participating teams were displayed and their names were announced in both English and French. Following this, Michael Bublé and The Sole Power Choir performed a cover of "Bring It On Home to Me". Alanis Morissette sang the Canadian national anthem and Aleksandar Gajić, a Yugoslav violinist, performed the Bosnian and Herzegovinan national anthem on a violin. After that, a flyover was conducted by the Canadian Forces Snowbirds.

=== Songs ===
- "Wild Things" / "Fire" – Alessia Cara
- "Siir Siir" – Nora Fatehi, Vegedream, and Sanjoy
- "Illuminate" – Jessie Reyez and Elyanna
- "Bring It On Home to Me" – Michael Bublé and The Sole Power Choir

== Opening ceremony in the United States ==
The opening ceremony in the United States lasted around fifteen minutes and began with a costumed representation of George Washington and a drumline dressed in red and blue with a gold star as well as a speech highlighting the diversity, culture and principles of the United States as well as acknowledging the United States Semiquincentennial. Afterwards, Future and Tyla performed "Game Time" surrounded by dancers dressed in red, white, blue as well as gold while the inflated trophy with American motifs was raised. Afterwards Lisa, Anitta, and Rema performed "Goals" surrounded by dancers as well as landmarks of Los Angeles and other American cities. Afterwards, the flag ceremony took place displaying the flags and reading the names of all 48 participating teams in English and was followed with a performance of "Wonder" by Katy Perry and Tius Luka. Finally, Dan + Shay performed the American national anthem while Purahéi Soul performed the Paraguayan national anthem before the match, concluding the ceremony which portrayed the global appeal of the American culture and its entertainment industry.

=== Songs ===
- "Game Time" – Future and Tyla
- "Goals" – Lisa, Anitta, and Rema
- "Wonder" – Katy Perry and Tius Luka

== Dignitaries in attendance ==
Unlike previous World Cups, the leaders of each host country did not attend their opening ceremonies for various reasons. Mexican president Claudia Sheinbaum gave her ticket away to a fan amidst the controversy with high ticket prices and protests against several of her policies, Canadian prime minister Mark Carney did not attend due to plans to head to the 52nd G7 summit in France, and American president Donald Trump did not attend due to plans and preparation surrounding mixed martial arts event UFC Freedom 250 in Washington, D.C.. Former Canadian prime minister Justin Trudeau attended the American opening ceremony at SoFi Stadium in an unofficial capacity. This decision was criticized as being disrespectful by some Canadian fans for choosing to attend the American ceremony over the Canadian one.

- President of FIFA – Gianni Infantino and all members of the FIFA Council
- President of Paraguay – Santiago Peña
- United States Secretary of State – Marco Rubio
  - United States Secretary of Transportation – Sean Duffy
  - United States Secretary of Homeland Security – Markwayne Mullin

== See also ==
- 2026 FIFA World Cup final halftime show
