= RushDee =

American record producer, songwriter, and recording artist

RushDee Williams
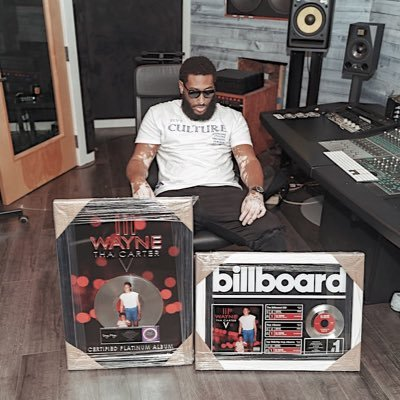

Background information
- Born: RushDee Williams; August 19, 1987 (age 39)
- Origin: North side of Saginaw, Michigan
- Genres: Hip hop; R&B
- Occupations: record producer; recording artist; songwriter
- Instruments: drums; saxophone; bass guitar; keyboards; vocals
- Years active: 2008–present
- Label: BeGenius Records
- Website: www.rushdeeofficial.com

RushDee McCoy Williams (born August 19, 1987), known professionally and mononymously as RushDee, is an American record producer, songwriter, and recording artist from Saginaw, Michigan. As a songwriter and producer, RushDee has contributed to projects released by recording artists such as Chris Brown, Lil Wayne, Lil Baby, Nicki Minaj, Nipsey Hussle, ATL Jacob, Fabolous, Currensy, Serayah, and Ace Hood. He is the founder of entertainment, management, and publishing company BeGenius.

== Activism ==
In March 2021, Williams assisted in organizing a protest that took place outside of a Saginaw pizzeria days after a dispute transpired between Williams and the manager of the business. After attempted correspondence on behalf of local news media, the owner of the company issued a statement and the manager was fired.

== Musical career ==
Via coordination with film producer Randall Emmett, Williams procured his first credits for film score composition with Reprisal and later Hard Kill, both productions of Lionsgate Films. Williams would later move on to working on Television productions such as Love and Hip-Hop: Miami, Black Ink: Chicago, House Hunters, Top Elf, David Makes Man, and the NBA 2K video game series.

Williams operates in the capacity of artist management and has a history of lending his expertise to upcoming recording artists including student attendees of Sylvester Broome Empowerment Village within the Flint Community Schools district.

== Artistry ==
=== Musical influences ===
Recording artists such as Jay-Z, Master P, DMX, Tupac and producers Pharrell Williams, Timbaland, Metro Boomin, Quincy Jones, and Rick Rubin have been cited to be inspirations to Williams' musical development.

Williams also accredits his musical influence to his grandmother, a singer and director of her church choir and his father an instrumentalist playing the conga drums and saxophone.

== Production and writing discography ==
=== 2026 ===
Chris Brown – Brown

- 10. "Red Rum" (featuring YoungBoy Never Broke Again)

Courtney Bell featuring Royce Da 5'9" and Benny The Butcher – Wounded Healer

- 8. "Bang" (songwriter)

Future – The Real Me

- 7. "Konnichiwa" (with ATL Jacob, MikeWavvs, and Wheezy)

=== 2025 ===
Lil Wayne – Tha Carter VI

- "Momma Don't Worry" (featuring Future and Lil Baby) (with ATL Jacob)

Ace Hood – S.O.U.L.

- 1. "S.O.U.L."
- 2. "Mister Hood"
- 4. "Righteous Sin"
- 7. "Triggered"
- 8. "Had To"
- 11. "Shed"
- 13. "Georgia Lyric"
- 14. "Make It Home"

Alabama Barker – Cry Bhabie

- 1. "Cry Bhabie" (with ATL Jacob and Jordan K. Johnson)

=== 2024 ===
Serayah – Archives (Extended Version)

- "Damaged Goods" (featuring Hylan Starr) (songwriter)

=== 2023 ===
Nicki Minaj – Pink Friday 2

- "Last Time I Saw You" (songwriter)

Serayah – Flutter

- "Feel Something" (songwriter, producer)
- "Real" (featuring Lady London) (songwriter, producer)
- "Danger" (songwriter, producer)
- "F.B.B." (songwriter, producer)
- "Should I Stay" (songwriter, producer)

=== 2017 ===
'Fabolous & Jadakiss – Friday On Elm Street

- 11. "Nightmares Ain't As Bad"

=== 2018 ===
Reprisal (film) – Original Soundtrack

- "Armor Hero"

=== 2019 ===
Currensy, Trademark Da Skydiver Young Roddy – Plan of Attack

- 12. "Still Coolie in the Cut"

=== 2021 ===
Yung Mal – 1.5 Way or No Way

- 13. "1.5 Way or No Way"

Mozzy – "Untreated Trauma"

- 5. "Reeboks"
