= Elyanna =

Palestinian singer (born 2002)

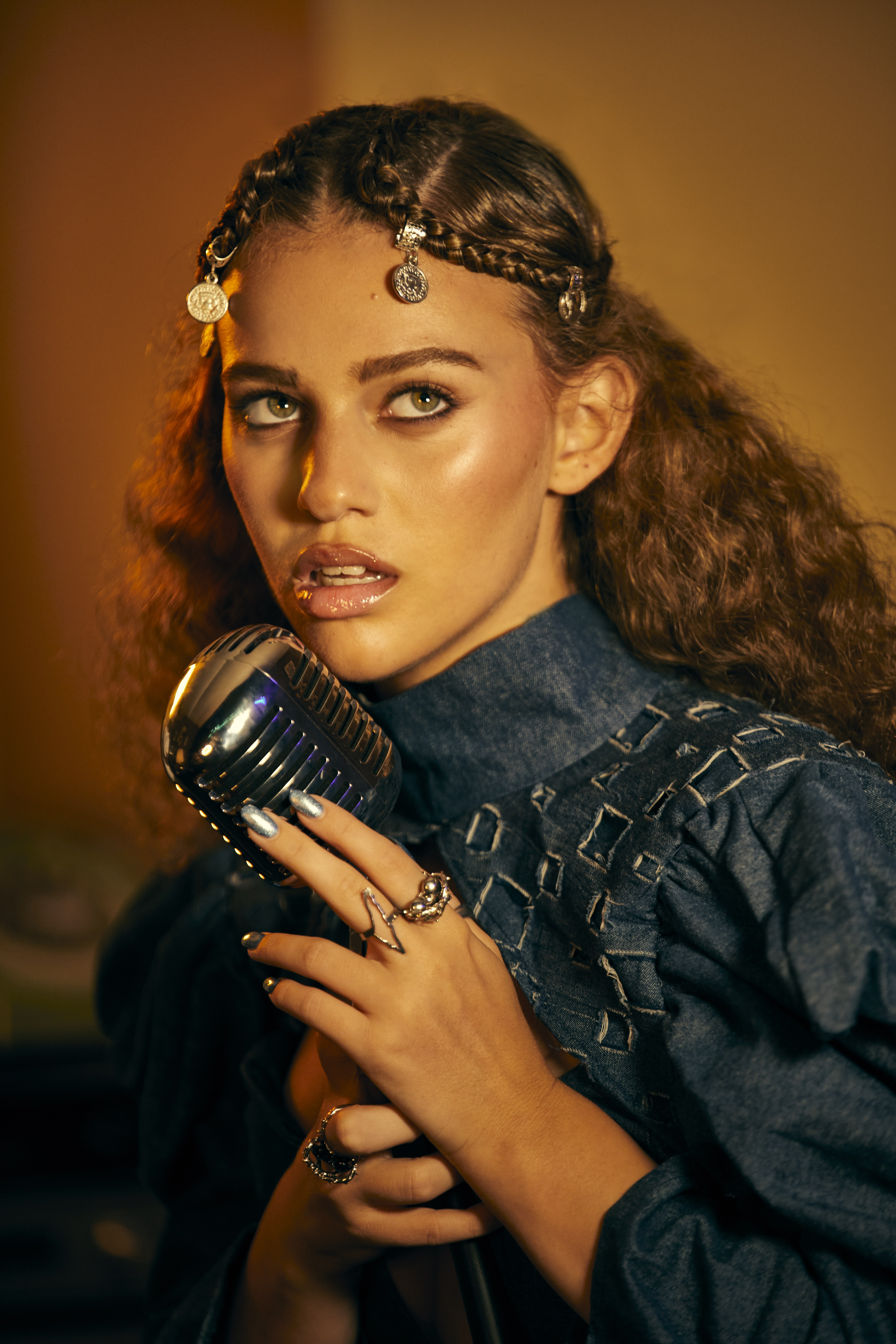
- Elyanna in 2022

Background information
- Also known as: Elian Margieh
- Born: Elian Amer Marjieh; January 22, 2002 (age 24); Nazareth, Israel
- Genres: Alternative pop; Arabic pop; Arabic traditional music; urban
- Occupations: Singer; songwriter
- Years active: 2019–present
- Label: Universal Arabic Music
- Website: elyanna.com

Elian Amer Marjieh (sometimes credited as Margieh; Arabic: إليان عامر مرجية; born January 22, 2002), known professionally as Elyanna (إليانا), is a Palestinian and Chilean singer-songwriter. She merges Arabic music with Latin rhythms to create an experimental Arab-pop sound. Born in Nazareth, Israel, her musical talents were nurtured by her family, with early influences including iconic figures like Julio Iglesias and Sabah Fakhri, Elyanna's career took a significant turn when she was discovered at age 15 by Grammy-winner Nasri Atweh.

She has released two EPs: Elyanna (2020) and Elyanna II (2022), and one studio album: Woledto (2024). She is currently signed to Universal Arabic Music. Her singles "Ana Lahale", "Ghareeb Alay", "Ala Bali", and "Mama Eh" have all charted on The Official Lebanese Top 20. Elyanna is the first artist to sing in Arabic on The Late Show with Stephen Colbert. During her 2024 tour promoting Woledto she sold out The Wiltern in Los Angeles and KOKO in London.

== Early life ==
Elian Marjieh was born and raised in Nazareth, Israel, and is of Palestinian descent. Her paternal grandmother is of Chilean descent. Her mother is a Palestinian poet, and her maternal grandfather is a Palestinian poet and singer who used to perform zajal at Palestinian weddings. Her paternal grandmother is a pianist from Chile, who she frequently visited as a child. She was born into a Palestinian Christian family.

Elyanna began singing at age seven and started posting covers of songs on SoundCloud as a teenager while participating in singing and talent competitions at school. She gained popularity in her community alongside her brother, Feras, who was by her side as a pianist. Feras is now Elyanna's pianist, producer, and creative director. Her sister, Tali, handles her styling.

In 2017, at the age of 15, she and her family moved to San Diego, California, (eventually settling in Los Angeles) to further pursue her musical career after coming across Wassim "Sal" Slaiby on TV. After arriving in the United States, she began posting covers on her Instagram, where she garnered a following of around 300,000 users, and grabbing the attention of musician and producer Nasri Atweh. Nasri would later introduce Elyanna to Sal, and she would spend weekdays in San Diego while driving up to Los Angeles on weekends to work on music with Nasri and Massari.

== Career ==
Elyanna draws inspiration from jazz and blues alongside many household names for families in the Middle East: Dalida, Fairuz, Sabah Fakhri, Abd El Halim Hafez. In 2018, Elyanna contacted singer and producer, Nasri, who took an interest and connected her to his manager, Wassim Slaiby. She was signed to Slaiby's management company, SALXCO, soon after the two met. She was then mentored by Nasri and fellow singer and producer, Massari. One of her first singles, "Ana Lahale," featured guest vocals from Massari. That track was on her debut self-titled EP released in February 2020 via ElMar Music, an Empire Distribution imprint. In April 2021, Elyanna was announced as one of the first signees of the newly-formed imprint, Universal Arabic Music (UAM), which Slaiby founded in collaboration with Republic Records and the Universal Music Group.

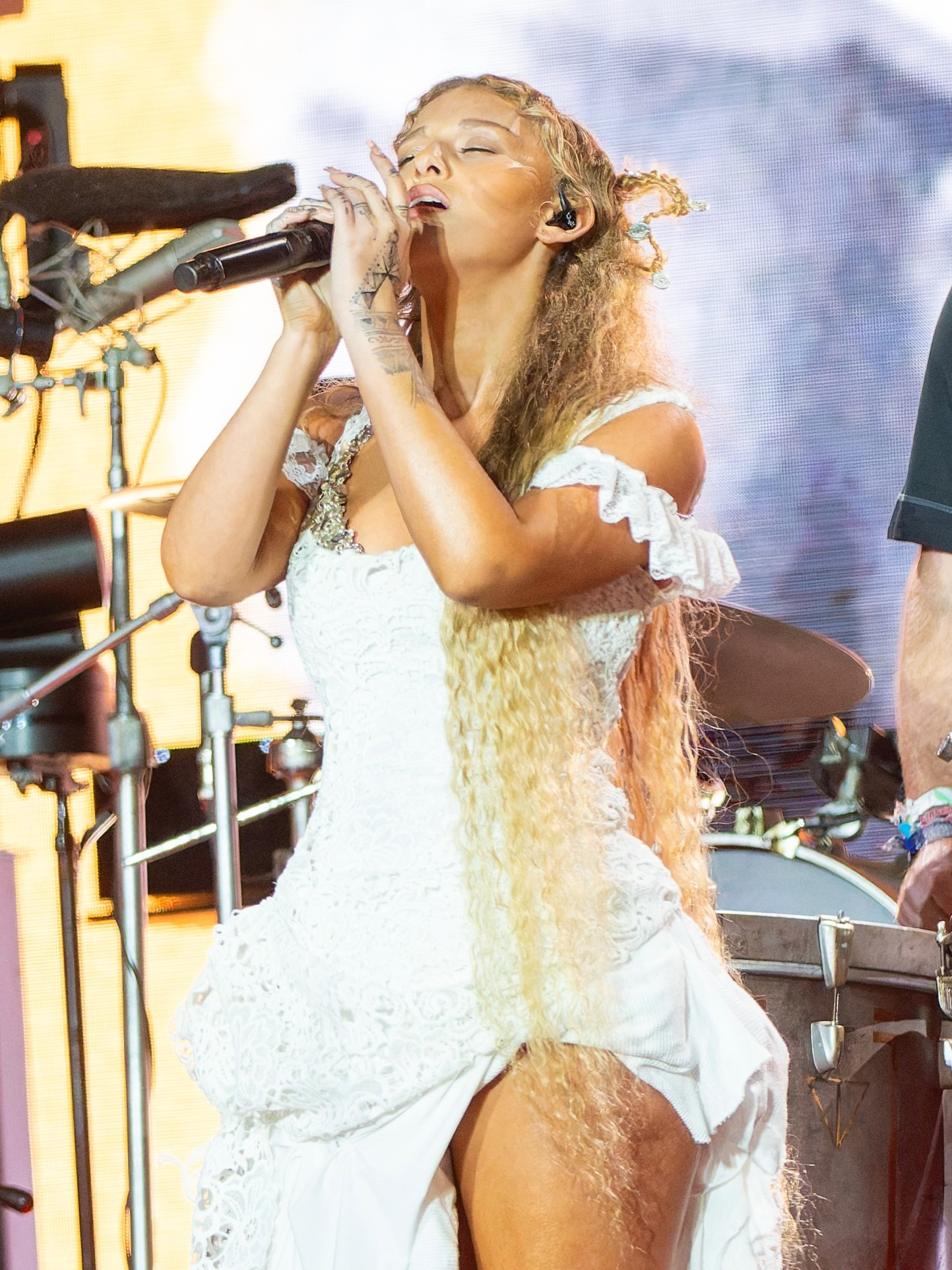
Elyanna performing with Coldplay at the 2024 Glastonbury Festival in 2024

In 2021, she performed alongside Alnajjar at his concert in Amman, Jordan the following month. In January 2022, she collaborated with Tunisian artist, Balti, on the track "Ghareeb Alay." In March 2022, she released her second EP, Elyanna II, via UAM. The collection features the single "Al Kawn Janni Maak" (an Arabic version of "La Vie en rose"). Its music video was directed by Caroline "Chuck" Grant, the sister of Lana Del Rey, who ultimately got involved in the project by styling Elyanna. In 2023, the singer made history as the first artist to perform a set entirely in Arabic at the Coachella Valley Music and Arts Festival.

That the same year, her song "Ala Bali" was featured on Netflix comedy-drama series Mo. She also performed at the El Gouna Film Festival and paid tribute to Palestine with her single "Olive Branch (غصن زيتون)". In 2024, Elyanna sold out her debut North American tour and ended it with the announcement of her debut studio album, Woledto, released on April 12 alongside a music video for "Ganeni".

Boutayna Chokrane praised the record on her review for Pitchfork, stating that it "plays with Arab pop, R&B, EDM, and jazz to express the nuances of love, loss, and longing". She was positive of the "subtle yet poignant references to identity, displacement, and cultural resilience" as well, as those "underscore [Elyanna's] sorrow and ferocity". Moreover, the singer has been featured on the covers of numerous magazines worldwide, including Billboard Arabia, Vogue Arabia, Rolling Stone, Cosmopolitan ME and GQ. On 29 June 2024, she was invited by British rock band Coldplay to perform the songs "We Pray" and "Arabesque" at the 2024 Glastonbury Festival. On July 22, the singer officially announced the Woledto Tour, with concerts in North America and Europe between October and December 2024. Elyanna performed alongside Coldplay for Saturday Night Live on 5 October 2024.

In 2026, Elyanna collaborated with Canadian singer Jessie Reyez on "Illuminate", the fourth single from the 2026 FIFA World Cup soundtrack. Produced by Cirkut. The song was released through SALXCO UAM and Def Jam Recordings. Elyanna also performed at the 2026 FIFA World Cup opening ceremony in Toronto. The line-up for the ceremony at Toronto's BMO Field also included Alanis Morissette, Michael Bublé, and Alessia Cara.

== Discography ==
=== Studio albums ===
List of studio albums with selected details
Title	Details
Woledto	Released: April 12, 2024; Label: Universal Arabic Music; Formats: Digital download, streaming

=== Extended plays ===
List of EPs with selected details
Title	Details
Elyanna	Released: February 7, 2020; Label: ElMar Music, Empire; Formats: Digital download, streaming
Elyanna II	Released: March 4, 2022; Label: Universal Arabic Music; Formats: Digital download, streaming

=== Singles ===
==== As lead artist ====
List of singles as a lead artist, with selected chart positions, showing year released and album name
Title	Year	Peak chart positions		Album
Title	Year	Arab	LBN	Album
"Ta Ta"	2019	—	—	Non-album single
"Ahwak"	2019	—	—	Elyanna
"Enta Eih"	2019	—	—	Non-album single
"Oululee Leh"	2019	—	—	Elyanna
"Shee"	2020	—	—	Elyanna
"Ana Lahale" (featuring Massari)	2020	—	1	Elyanna
"Ghareeb Alay" (featuring Balti)	2022	—	2	Elyanna II
"Al Kawn Janni Maak"	2022	—	—	Elyanna II
"Youm Wara Youm" (with Hijazi)	2022	—	—	Non-album single
"Ala Bali"	2022	—	6	Elyanna II
"Sokkar"	2023	—	—	Non-album single
"Mama Eh"	2023	—	1	Woledto
"Al Sham"	2024	—	—	Woledto
"Good Torture" (with Sevdaliza)	2024	—	—	TBA
"Olive Branch (Ghosn Zeytoun)"	2024	—	—	Non-album single
"Ganeni"	2024	4	3	Woledto
"Wala Ghalta" (with Joseph Attieh)	2024	—	14	Non-album single
"Illuminate" (with Jessie Reyez)	2026	—	—	FIFA World Cup 2026 Official Album
"BOSA"	2026	—	—	Non-album single
"—" denotes a recording that did not chart or was not released in that territory.

==== As featured artist ====
List of singles as a featured artist, with selected chart positions, showing year released and album name
Title	Year	Peak chart positions										Certifications	Album
Title	Year	CAN	FRA	GER	ITA	LBN	NLD	NZ Hot	SWI	UK	US	Certifications	Album
"Hada Ghareeb" (Issam Alnajjar featuring Elyanna)	2021	—	—	—	—	1	—	—	—	—	—		Baree?
"We Pray" (Coldplay featuring Little Simz, Burna Boy, Elyanna and Tini)	2024	92	126	40	71	1	30	7	22	20	87	BPI: Gold; RMNZ: Gold; SNEP: Platinum	Moon Music
"—" denotes a recording that did not chart or was not released in that territory.

== Tours ==
Headlining

- The Woledto World Tour (2024)

North America
Date (2024)	City	Country	Venue
October 5	Austin	United States	Austin City Limits
October 7	Houston	United States	House of Blues
October 9	Dallas	United States	House of Blues
October 12	Austin	United States	Austin City Limits
October 15	Fort Lauderdale	United States	Revolution Live
October 17	Atlanta	United States	Buckhead Theater
October 19	Charlotte	United States	The Underground
October 21	Philadelphia	United States	Theater of Living Arts
October 22	Silver Spring	United States	The Fillmore Silver Spring
October 24	Brooklyn	United States	Brooklyn Paramount
October 25	Boston	United States	Big Night Live
October 27	Montreal	Canada	MTELUS
October 28	Toronto	Canada	REBEL
October 30	Chicago	United States	Riviera Theater
November 1	Detroi	United States	The Fillmore Detroit
November 2	St. Louis	United States	The Pageant
November 6	Minneapolis	United States	Varsity Theater
November 8	Denver	United States	Summit
November 11	Seattle	United States	Neptune Theater
November 13	Vancouver	Canada	Commodore Ballroom
November 15	Sacramento	United States	Ace of Spades
November 17	Oakland	United States	Fox Theater
November 20	San Diego	United States	The Observatory North Park
Europe
Date (2024)	City	Country	Venue
November 26	Amsterdam	The Netherlands	Paradiso
November 28	Barcelona	Spain	Paral.el 62
December 1	Paris	France	La Cigale
December 2	Brussels	Belgium	La Madaleine
December 4	Berlin	Germany	Metropol
December 7	Stockholm	Sweden	Vasateatern
December 16	London	England	O2 Shephard's Bush Empire

Opening act

- Coldplay – Music of the Spheres World Tour (2025)

== Awards and nominations ==
List of awards and nominations
Award	Year	Recipient(s) and nominee(s)	Category	Result	Ref.
Billboard Arabia Music Awards	2024	Herself	Top Arabic Indie Female Artist	Won	
Billboard Arabia Music Awards	2024	Herself	Top New Artist	Won	
