= List of German airplay number-one songs of 2026 =

The Official German Airplay Chart is an airplay chart compiled by MusicTrace on behalf of Bundesverband Musikindustrie (Federal Association of Phonographic Industry).

== Chart history ==
Key
‡	Indicates singles which also reached the top of the German singles chart

Issue date	Title	Artist(s)	Ref.
2 January	"The Fate of Ophelia"‡	Taylor Swift	
9 January	"The Fate of Ophelia"‡	Taylor Swift	
16 January	"Gone Gone Gone"	David Guetta, Teddy Swims, and Tones and I	
23 January	"Don't Worry"	Leony	
30 January	"All Time High"	Nico Santos	
6 February	"Bandaids"	Katy Perry	
13 February	"Opalite"‡	Taylor Swift	
20 February	"I Just Might"	Bruno Mars	
27 February	"Opalite"‡	Taylor Swift	
6 March	"I Just Might"	Bruno Mars	
13 March	"I Just Might"	Bruno Mars	
20 March	"I Just Might"	Bruno Mars	
27 March	"I Just Might"	Bruno Mars	
6 April	"I Just Might"	Bruno Mars	
13 April	"To Love Somebody"	Holly Humberstone	
20 April	"Fever Dream"	Alex Warren	
27 April	"Fever Dream"	Alex Warren	
4 May	"Fever Dream"	Alex Warren	
11 May	"Fever Dream"	Alex Warren	
18 May	"Fever Dream"	Alex Warren	
25 May	"Fever Dream"	Alex Warren	
1 June	"Fever Dream"	Alex Warren	
8 June	"Fever Dream"	Alex Warren	
15 June	"New Religion"	Bebe Rexha and Faithless	
22 June	"Mr. Know It All"	Teddy Swims	
29 June	"Mr. Know It All"	Teddy Swims	
6 July	"Mr. Know It All"	Teddy Swims	
13 July	"Mr. Know It All"	Teddy Swims	
20 July	"Mr. Know It All"	Teddy Swims	
27 July	"Dai Dai"‡	Shakira and Burna Boy	
3 August	"Dai Dai"‡	Shakira and Burna Boy	
10 August	"Dai Dai"‡	Shakira and Burna Boy	
17 August	"Dai Dai"‡	Shakira and Burna Boy	
24 August	"Dai Dai"‡	Shakira and Burna Boy	
31 August	"I Knew It, I Knew You"‡	Taylor Swift	
7 September	"I Knew It, I Knew You"‡	Taylor Swift	
14 September	"I Knew It, I Knew You"‡	Taylor Swift	
21 September	"Why Don't You Stay"	Nico Santos	
28 September	"Why Don't You Stay"	Nico Santos	
5 October	"Why Don't You Stay"	Nico Santos	
12 October	"Animal"	Katseye	
19 October	"Animal"	Katseye	
26 October	"Animal"	Katseye	
2 November	"Animal"	Katseye	
9 November	"Find Me"	Aris Tiffany	
16 November	"Find Me"	Aris Tiffany	
23 November	"Find Me"	Aris Tiffany	
