= Hands Up (Jelly Roll song) =

2026 single by Jelly Roll

Single by Jelly Roll
- Released: June 24, 2026
- Genre: Country
- Length: 3:14
- Label: Bailee & Buddy; This Is Hit; Stoney Creek
- Songwriters: Jason DeFord; Michael Hardy; Chase McGill; Joe Fox; Rocky Block
- Producers: Charlie Handsome; Ben Johnson

Jelly Roll singles chronology
"Lighter" (2026)	"Hands Up" (2026)

Music video
- "Hands Up" on YouTube

"Hands Up" is a song by American singer Jelly Roll. It was released on June 24, 2026, as the lead single from his upcoming eleventh studio album. It was written by Jelly Roll, Michael Hardy, Chase McGill, Joe Fox and Rocky Block and produced by Charlie Handsome and Ben Johnson.

== Background ==
Jelly Roll first performed the song during a surprise appearance at CMA Fest 2026, in early June 2026. On the day before its release, he teased the song on social media along with shared clips of his weight loss journey.

== Composition ==
The song features noodling acoustic guitar, with a driving drum pattern building up before the chorus. Lyrically, Jelly Roll reflects on three pivotal events of his life that have helped shape the person he is today: attending a Rage Against the Machine concert in Nashville in 1999, getting arrested for breaking into someone's house to recover a bag of marijuana, and finding his faith. In each of these experiences, he throws his hands up, although the phrase is used in a different context each time.

== Music video ==
The music video was released on July 17, 2026. It was directed by Anthony Mandler and filmed in black-and-white at the San Quentin Rehabilitation Center in San Francisco. The video opens with Jelly Roll arriving at the prison while reciting a prayer in a voiceover, which continues as he joins a group of inmates holding instruments, who serve as his backing band. He performs a concert inside the facility alongside them, and also enters the canteen, where he greets and shakes hands with incarcerated men. In addition, Jelly Roll helps an inmate find redemption, as the visual shows flashbacks of his past and the crimes that led to his imprisonment.

== Charts ==
Chart performance for "Hands Up"
Chart (2026)	Peak position
Canada Hot 100 (Billboard)	72
Canada Country (Billboard)	5
US Billboard Hot 100	74
US Country Airplay (Billboard)	8
US Hot Country Songs (Billboard)	23
