= Illuminate (song) =

Single by Jessie Reyez and Elyanna

from the album Official FIFA World Cup 2026 Album
- Language: English; Arabic
- Released: May 8, 2026
- Genre: Alternative R&B; Global pop; Arabic pop
- Length: 3:03
- Label: SALXCO UAM; Def Jam
- Songwriters: Jessica Reyez; Elian Amer Marjieh; Feras Marjieh; Abeer Sbiat Marjieh; Sari Abboud; Henry Russell Walter
- Producer: Cirkut

Jessie Reyez singles chronology
"Ain't U Tired" (2026)	"Illuminate" (2026)	"Ur Heartbeat (Who Do U Think About at 2AM?)" (2026)

Elyanna singles chronology
"Yabn El Eh" (2024)	"Illuminate" (2026)	"Bosa" (2026)

FIFA World Cup 2026 singles chronology
"Echo" (2026)	"Illuminate" (2026)	"Dai Dai" (2026)

Original cover

Music video
- "Illuminate" on YouTube

"Illuminate" is a song by Canadian singer Jessie Reyez and Palestinian-Chilean singer Elyanna. It was released on 8 May 2026 through SALXCO UAM and Def Jam Recordings, as the fourth single from the official album of the 2026 FIFA World Cup. It was produced by Cirkut and Feras, both of whom also contributed to the songwriting alongside Massari, and Abeer Sbiat Marjieh.

The song features a combination of alternative R&B, global pop, and Middle Eastern-inspired sounds. FIFA described the song as a celebration of cultural connection through music and sport.

== Background and recording ==
The song developed during a studio session involving Elyanna, her brother Feras Margieh, and producer Cirkut. According to Elyanna, she heard the track for the first time during the session and reacting immediately to the demo and recorded her vocals on the same day. In an interview, she recalled, "[I] recorded it that same day", Elyanna told The Fader over a video call from Los Angeles.

FIFA selected Elyanna and Jessie Reyez to perform the song as part of a collaboration intended to bring together artists from different cultural backgrounds. The project drew on the performers' respective Palestinian-Chilean and Colombian heritage, which was reflected in elements of the song and its accompanying visual presentation. The Arabic-language lyrics were co-written by Elyanna, Massari, and Elyanna's mother, Abeer Sbiat Marjieh.

Elyanna on being part of the Official FIFA World Cup 2026 Soundtracks

I am deeply proud to represent my culture, my country, and the Middle East, North Africa, and the Arab world on such a global stage … through this song "Illuminate", The tournament “brings people from all over the world together to celebrate culture and humanity.

=== Charitable causes ===
The song was also associated with charitable initiatives, with Reyez donating her artist fee from the song and Elyanna expressing plans to support related causes.

== Music and lyrics ==
The song is a combination of Reyez's alternative R&B style with the Arabic, Chilean, and pop fusion by Elyanna. Elyanna moves between the two languages English and Arabic throughout the song. The Arabic part contains lyrics that translate into "Let me hear your voice, the best in the world / Shout out to the champions," as well as the expression "Oh, the night." As for the English parts, these contain confident and persevering statements, with the central word being "illuminate," which serves as a representation of unity beyond cultural barriers.

== Controversy ==
After the release of her album "Illuminate," there was new controversy about whether Elyanna was a representative of Palestinians as an important figure in the Palestinian music community. On the one hand, some observers regarded her fame on the international stage as her cultural representation, while on the other hand, it was argued whether her personal representation as well as artistic one had any connection to the Palestinian culture. In an article for the Israeli newspaper Haaretz, writer Sheren Falah Saab mentioned the comments of Rob Eshman, a writer at "The Jewish Journal" website, where he compared Elyanna with Gigi Hadid and Bella Hadid as Palestinian-Americans, representing themselves as "informal cultural ambassadors" of the Israeli–Palestinian conflict.

== Live performances ==
Reyez and Elyanna performed "Illuminate" at the FIFA World Cup 2026 opening ceremony, which took place on Friday, June 12, at the Toronto Stadium in Canada. This performance occurred during Canada's first match against Bosnia and Herzegovina. The performance made Elyanna the only artist on the FIFA World Cup 2026 soundtrack to represent the MENA (Middle East and North Africa) region.

== Critical reception ==
¡Hola! US described "Illuminate" as "one of the most emotionally driven songs released so far from the Official FIFA World Cup 2026 Album," and noted that the track "doesn't lean entirely into stadium-ready energy, but takes a more intimate and atmospheric direction while still carrying the scale expected from a World Cup soundtrack." A more critical review by Remezcla, where Richard Villegas assessed the full album of FIFA World Cup 2026 releases in a column. Villegas was broadly negative toward the album's approach, arguing that the songs prioritised "TikTok activations" over communal, fan-centred songwriting. he described "Illuminate" as "an EDM track that again resorts to archival footage and scenes of the women belly dancing in a generic studio space," grouping it with other entries in the album that he felt lacked human authenticity.

== Charts ==
Weekly chart performance
Chart (2026)	Peak position
Nigeria Bubbling Under Hot 100 (TurnTable)	23
Nigeria Airplay (TurnTable)	70

== Credits and personnel ==
Credits adapted from the official FIFA press release and The National.

- Jessica Reyez – lead vocals, songwriting
- Elian Amer Marjieh – lead vocals, songwriting
- Feras Marjieh – songwriting
- Abeer Sbiat Marjieh – songwriting
- Sari Abboud – songwriting
- Henry Russell Walter – production, songwriting

== Release history ==
Release dates and formats
Region	Date	Format	Label
Various	May 8, 2026	Digital download; streaming	SALXCO; Def Jam Recordings
