= Supposed to Be Loved =

Single by DJ Khaled, Lil Baby, and Future featuring Lil Uzi Vert

from the album Aalam of God (intended)
- Released: August 11, 2023
- Genre: Trap
- Length: 3:27
- Label: We the Best; Def Jam
- Songwriters: Khaled Khaled; Dominique Jones; Nayvadius Cash; Symere Woods; Bryan Simmons; Quincy Jones; James Ingram
- Producers: DJ Khaled; TM88; C$D Sid; Magnificent; Slo Meezy

DJ Khaled singles chronology
"Big Time" (2022)	"Supposed to Be Loved" (2023)	"Dientes" (2023)

Lil Baby singles chronology
"Family Freestyle" (2023)	"Supposed to Be Loved" (2023)	"Forever" (2023)

Future singles chronology
"Turn Yo Clic Up" (2023)	"Supposed to Be Loved" (2023)	"Hard to Handle" (2023)

Lil Uzi Vert singles chronology
"The End" (2023)	"Supposed to Be Loved" (2023)	"Endless Fashion" (2023)

Visualizer
- "Supposed to Be Loved" on YouTube

"Supposed to Be Loved" is a song by American disc jockey DJ Khaled and American rappers Lil Baby and Future featuring fellow American rapper Lil Uzi Vert. It was released on August 11, 2023 by We the Best Music and Def Jam Recordings, intended as the lead single from the Khaled's upcoming fourteenth studio album, Aalam of God, however it was scrapped prior to a two year album delay. It is Khaled's first release through the Def Jam label.

Produced by Khaled himself and TM88, the song was written by the two alongside its lead performers. As it samples "P.Y.T. (Pretty Young Thing)" by Michael Jackson, Quincy Jones and James Ingram are credited as songwriters from interpolation. Khaled announced the song and album name a day prior to the latter's release. Hints at a collaboration between Khaled and Lil Uzi Vert were given as they were spotted in a recording studio together the previous month.

== Composition and lyrics ==
"Supposed to Be Loved" is an upbeat trap song that contains samples of the single "P.Y.T. (Pretty Young Thing)" by Michael Jackson from his sixth studio album, Thriller (1982). It sees Lil Baby, Future, and Lil Uzi Vert rapping about adoring their significant others in the way they feel they should, with a catchy chorus from the former.

Despite featuring explicit lyrics, it is not officially marked as such, even getting nominated for "Favorite Music Collaboration" at the 2024 Kids' Choice Awards in the process.

== Charts ==
Chart performance for "Supposed to Be Loved"
Chart (2023)	Peak position
New Zealand Hot Singles (RMNZ)	15
US Billboard Hot 100	52
US Hot R&B/Hip-Hop Songs (Billboard)	15
US Rhythmic Airplay (Billboard)	7

== Accolades ==
Awards and nominations for "Supposed To Be Loved"
Year	Award	Category	Result	Ref.
2024	Nickelodeon Kids' Choice Awards	Favorite Music Collaboration	Nominated	

== Release history ==
Release history and formats for "Supposed to Be Loved"
Country	Date	Format	Label	Ref.
Various	August 11, 2023	CD single; digital download; streaming	We the Best; Def Jam	
United States	August 15, 2023	Rhythmic contemporary	We the Best; Def Jam	
