= One of Them (song) =

2026 single by DJ Khaled, Future and Lil Baby

Single by DJ Khaled, Future and Lil Baby

from the album Aalam of God
- Released: April 10, 2026
- Genre: Trap
- Length: 3:24
- Label: We the Best; Republic
- Songwriters: Nayvadius Wilburn; Dominique Jones; Bryan Simmons; Isaiah Quick; Mark Nikolaev; Domrachev Ivan Sergeevich Concentracia
- Producers: DJ Khaled; TM88; Rozay Knockin; Marko Lenz; Concentracia

DJ Khaled singles chronology
"Brother" (2025)	"One of Them" (2026)	"Hvracan" (2026)

Future singles chronology
"Money on Money" (2026)	"One of Them" (2026)	"Game Time" (2026)

Lil Baby singles chronology
"Tuition (Remix)" (2026)	"One of Them" (2026)	"Alicia" (2026)

Music video
- "One of Them" on YouTube

"One of Them" is a song by American record producer DJ Khaled and American rappers Future and Lil Baby, released on April 10, 2026 as the fourth single from Khaled's upcoming fourteenth studio album, Aalam of God. It was produced by Khaled himself, TM88, Rozay Knockin, Marko Lenz and Concentracia.

== Composition ==
The song contains trap production with a piano loop, while the lyrics revolve around high social status and success.

== Critical reception ==
Tallie Spencer of HotNewHipHop stated "Khaled keeps his formula simple here. He pairs two reliable hitmakers who already have chemistry. Future brings his usual effortless delivery, while Lil Baby adds a sharper, more focused edge." Shawn Grant of The Source called the song a "high-intensity record that positions all three artists in top form." Stanisland Magazine gave a negative review, questioning DJ Khaled's involvement in the production. While they commented that Future and Lil Baby's features "boost[s] the prestige of the track to a level that can strengthen its reception", they criticized their performances as predictable, adding "With all the usual hallmarks of a narrow spectrum of banal-sounding chart rap, which at times sounds offbeat and forced. That's the downside of over-processing autotuned vocals atop a production laden with formulaic motifs."

== Music video ==
The music video was released alongside the single. Directed by Kid Art, it has been described as reminiscent of action films. It features fast-paced sequences and dramatic visuals, including hand-to-hand combat and crashing through ceilings.

== Charts ==
Chart performance for "One of Them"
Chart (2026)	Peak position
New Zealand Hot Singles (RMNZ)	25
Nigeria Bubbling Under Hot 100 (TurnTable)	3
Nigeria Airplay (TurnTable)	65
US Billboard Hot 100	70
US Hot R&B/Hip-Hop Songs (Billboard)	17
US Rhythmic Airplay (Billboard)	18
