= Official FIFA World Cup 2026 Album =

Compilation album by various artists
- Released: June 5, 2026
- Recorded: 2023–2026
- Studio: FIFA Sound
- Genre: Various
- Label: FIFA Sound (Universal Arabic/Republic/SALXCO/Def Jam)
- Producers: RedOne; Sal XO; Benny Adam; Adium; Édgar Barrera; Bava; Boaz van de Beatz; BongoByTheWay; Cirkut; Matt Clifford; Luke Dick; Diplo; The Elements; Emilio Estefan; Full Harmony; Zachary Aaron Golden; Albert Hype; Inverness; Ibrahim Maalouf; Connor McDonough; M-Phazes; Pink Slip; Mario Romero; Jota Rosa; Sanjoy; Shakira; Shonci; Tainy; Tropkillaz; Andrew Watt

FIFA World Cup chronology
FIFA World Cup Qatar 2022 Official Soundtrack (2022)	Official FIFA World Cup 2026 Album (2026)

Singles from Official FIFA World Cup 2026 Album
- 1. "Lighter" Released: March 20, 2026; 2. "Por Ella" Released: April 17, 2026; 3. "Echo" Released: April 28, 2026; 4. "Illuminate" Released: May 8, 2026; 5. "Dai Dai" Released: May 15, 2026; 6. "Goals" Released: May 21, 2026; 7. "Game Time" Released: May 29, 2026; 8. "World Cup (Champions)" Released: June 1, 2026; 9. "Siir Siir" Released: June 8, 2026; 10. "México, México" Released: July 4, 2026

Professional ratings
Review scores
Source	Rating
AllMusic	3.5/5 stars
PopMatters	8/10

The Official FIFA World Cup 2026 Album is a compilation album with various artists released on June 5, 2026. This album is the official music album of the 2026 FIFA World Cup held in the United States, Mexico, and Canada.

The album featured severals international artists and included the official song "Dai Dai" by Shakira and Burna Boy and the official anthem "DNA (More Than a Game)" by Andrea Bocelli, David Guetta, Ejae and Megan Thee Stallion.

== Background and development ==
As the case with 2022, a multi-song FIFA World Cup official soundtrack was released, instead of a playlist and a single official song, which was the case in 2018.

In March 2025, sixteen remixes of the theme song were released as separated album, which featured artists from each host city giving their own local spin to the song, including Dallas Austin, Ben Zakharenko, Dayvin and Berklee College of Music, Tre Nagella, Tech N9ne, Mexican Institute of Sound, Toy Selectah, Take a Daytrip, DJ Jazzy Jeff, Dan the Automator, Sango and Hill Kourkoutis.

On June 3, 2026, FIFA released the album's tracklist and announced its release for June 5, 2026. Nadir Khayat and Wassim Slaiby respectively from FIFA/FIFA Sound and SALXCO were the executive producers of the album. The album features international artists, including The Rolling Stones, Nelly Furtado, Lisa, Tyla, Future, Anitta, Rema, Alejandro Fernández, Carlos Vives, Grupo Frontera, J Balvin and French Montana. FIFA president Gianni Infantino stated the aim of the record project in the press release: "The Official FIFA World Cup 2026 Album features artists from across continents, languages and genres in a project designed to unite fans worldwide through the power of music and football".

On June 25, 2026, FIFA released the album's "Bonus Edition," featuring two new songs: Madonna's and Feid's "Read My Lips", ahead of Madonna's performance at the 2026 FIFA World Cup final halftime show, and "DNA (More Than a Game)," recorded by Andrea Bocelli, David Guetta, Ejae and Megan Thee Stallion for the tournament.

== Promotion ==
=== Official song and anthem ===
The official song of the tournament and the theme song for FIFA Education Fund, "Dai Dai", was released on May 15, 2026. It is performed by Shakira and Burna Boy. Its music video was released on May 23, 2026.

The official anthem "DNA (More Than a Game)" by Andrea Bocelli, David Guetta, Ejae and Megan Thee Stallion was released on June 10, 2026.

=== Singles ===
The first song of the album, besides the main theme song, is "Lighter", performed by Jelly Roll and Carín León, released on March 20, 2026, along with the music video. "Por Ella", performed by Belinda and the Mexican cumbia band Los Ángeles Azules, released on April 14, 2026, along with the music video. "Echo", performed by Daddy Yankee and Shenseea, released on April 28, 2026, along with the music video. "Illuminate", performed by Jessie Reyez and Elyanna, released on May 8, 2026, along with the music video.

"Goals", performed by Lisa, Anitta, and Rema, released on May 21, 2026, along with the music video. "Game Time", performed by Future and Tyla, released on May 29, 2026, along with the music video.

The album includes a previously unofficial song by American online streamer IShowSpeed, titled "World Cup (Champions)".

=== Live performances ===
On June 11, 2026, Shakira and Burna Boy performed "Dai Dai" live during the opening ceremony of the FIFA World Cup. Andrea Bocelli and Ejae also performed the official anthem, "DNA (More Than a Game)", during the ceremony. IShowSpeed performed "World Cup (Champions)" live during the closing ceremony of the 2026 FIFA World Cup final.

== Track listing ==
Standard edition
No.	Title	Writer(s)	Producer(s)	Length
1.	"Goals" (Lisa, Anitta, and Rema)	Larissa Machado; Divine Ikubor; Henry Walter; Kyle Buckley; Ava Brignol; Ricardo Fagundo; Andre da Silva; Risa Oribe; Jose de Godoy Pinheiro	Cirkut; Pink Slip; Bava; Tropkillaz^{[c]}	3:00
2.	"Game Time" (Future and Tyla)	Nayvadius Wilburn; Tyla Seethal; Walter; Ariowa Irosogie; Badriia Bourelly; Corey Marlon Lindsey-Keay; Imani Lewis; Jake Torrey; Jessica Agombar; Mark Mbogo; Omer Fedi	Cirkut	3:27
3.	"Illuminate" (Jessie Reyez and Elyanna)	Jessie Reyez; Elian Marjieh; Walter; Connor McDonough; Riley McDonough; Feras Marjieh; Abeer Marjieh; Aziza Brahim; Jesse Fink; Sari Abboud	Cirkut; C. McDonough	3:04
4.	"Echo" (Daddy Yankee and Shenseea)	Ramón Ayala; Chinsea Lee; Ibrahim Maalouf; Abboud; Martin Sinnote; Nathalia Marshall	Tainy; Maalouf; Adium; Albert Hype; Jota Rosa	2:16
5.	"Por Ella" (Belinda and Los Ángeles Azules)	Belinda Peregrín; Diego Bollella; Elias Mejia; Horacio Palencia	Albert Hype; Jota Rosa	3:02
6.	"Three Nations" (21 Savage, Natanael Cano, and French Montana)	Sheyaa Abraham-Joseph; Natanael Cano; Karim Kharbouch; Walter; Rob Nelson; Brignoli	Cirkut; Inverness	3:30
7.	"No Place Like Home" (Major Lazer, Nelly Furtado, and Davido)	Thomas Pentz; America Foster; Nelly Furtado; David Adeleke; Buckley; Boaz de Jong; Joe Reeves; Robert Soukiasyan; Brignol; Jim Lavigne; Reanno Gordon; Stefan Tisminezky; Trinidad Cardona	Diplo; Pink Slip; Boaz van de Beatz; Reeves; Soukiasyan	2:35
8.	"In the Stars" (The Rolling Stones; remix by Cirkut and Andrew Watt)	Jagger–Richards	Matt Clifford; Watt; Cirkut	4:59
9.	"Show Me" (Ayra Starr and Latto)	Oyinkansola Aderibigbe; Alyssa Stephens; Frank Brim; Joel Castillo; Olufeyikemi Osuntokun; Prince Omoferi	The Elements; Ilya^{[a]}	3:28
10.	"Mi Mexico Lindo" (Alejandro Fernández)	Bollella; Palencia; Nathan Galante; Édgar Barrera	Barrera; Mario Romero	2:34
11.	"Blessings" (Stormzy, Fridayy, and Angel)	Michael Omari Jr.; Francis Leblanc; Sirach Charles; Walter; Mark Landon	Cirkut; M-Phazes	3:36
12.	"Energy" (Ava Max and Bia)	Ava Max; Bianca Landrau; Buckley; Casey Smith; Georgia Ku; Joel Castillo; James Abrahart	Pink Slip	3:01
13.	"Lighter" (Jelly Roll and Carín León)	Jason DeFord; Walter; Luke Dick; Jon Randall; Jessi Alexander; Jessie Jo Dillon; Manuel Lorente; Daniel Rondón	Cirkut; Dick	3:00
14.	"Siir Siir" (Nora Fatehi, Vegedream, and Sanjoy)	Nora Fatehi; Satchela Djedje; Jesse Bluu; Russell Ali; Theron Thomas	Sanjoy; Ali^{[a]}	3:06
15.	"Partidazo" (Danny Ocean)	Daniel Morales; Cesar Pulgarin; Jean Carlos; Johann Strauss; Jose Benifez	Full Harmony	2:23
16.	"World Cup (Champions)" (IShowSpeed)	Darren Watkins Jr.; Buckley; Ephrem Lopez Jr.; Shawn Shea; Uforo Ebong; Doobie Newton; Olivier Francois; Vicente Gomez	Pink Slip; RiotUSA; Shonci; Bongo ByTheWay	4:16
17.	"Love Always Wins" (Zema featuring Shaggy and Cimafunk)	Orville Burrell; Erik Iglesias; Emilio Estefan	Estefan	3:08
18.	"Dai Dai" (Shakira and Burna Boy)	Shakira Mebarak; Jon Bellion; Ed Sheeran; Ahmed Saghir; Alexander Castillo	Shakira	3:43
Total length:				58:04

Bonus Edition
No.	Title	Writer(s)	Producer(s)	Length
12.	"DNA (More Than a Game)" (Andrea Bocelli, David Guetta, Ejae, and Megan Thee Stallion)	Andrea Bocelli; David Guetta; Kim Eun-jae; Megan Pete; Giovanni Damiani; Giorgio Tuinfort; Felix Hain; Lucas Hain; Bobby Session Jr.; Ashley Milton; Daniel Goudie; Francesco Pasquero; Norma Jean Martine	Guetta; Timofey Reznikov; Damiani; Conor Ross; Fast Boy; Tuinfort	2:56
13.	"Read My Lips (FIFA Version)" (Madonna and Feid)	Madonna Ciccone; Stuart Price; Marcos Masis; Salomón Villada Hoyos	Madonna; Price; Tainy	2:46

=== Notes ===
- ^{^[a]} signifies an additional producer.
- ^{^[c]} signifies a co-producer.

== Charts ==
Chart performance
Chart (2026)	Peak position
Canadian Albums (Billboard)	42
Dutch Compilation Albums (Compilation Top 30)	3
French Albums (SNEP) Opening Ceremony edition	36
German Compilation Albums (Offizielle Top 100)	4
Japanese Digital Albums (Oricon)	34
Japanese Download Albums (Billboard Japan)	32
Nigerian Albums (TurnTable) Opening Ceremony edition	60
US Billboard 200	124

== See also ==
- List of FIFA World Cup songs and anthems
