= Dai Dai =

Single by Shakira and Burna Boy

from the album Official FIFA World Cup 2026 Album
- Language: English; Spanish; Italian; French; Japanese; Portuguese (Portuguese version)
- English title: "Come on, Come on"
- Released: 15 May 2026; 7 August 2026 (Spanish version); 7 August 2026 (Portuguese version)
- Genre: Afrobeats; world; dance-pop; reggaeton
- Length: 3:43
- Label: Sony Latin
- Songwriters: Shakira Mebarak; Damini Ogulu; Alexander Castillo; Benny Adam; Jonathan Bellion; Ed Sheeran
- Producers: Shakira; A.C.

Shakira singles chronology
"Choka Choka" (2026)	"Dai Dai" (2026)	"Agua" (2026)

Burna Boy singles chronology
"WGFT" (2025)	"Dai Dai" (2026)

2026 FIFA World Cup singles chronology
"Illuminate" (2026)	"Dai Dai" (2026)	"Goals" (2026)

Music video
- "Dai Dai" on YouTube

"Dai Dai" (lit. 'Come on, come on') is a song by Colombian singer Shakira and Nigerian singer Burna Boy. It was released on 15 May 2026, through Ace Entertainment and Sony Music Latin as the official song for the 2026 FIFA World Cup held in the United States, Mexico, and Canada. A Spanish version of the song and a Portuguese version featuring Léo Santana and Felipe Ret were released on 7 August 2026. The song mentions several notable football players, such as Pelé, Diego Maradona, Cristiano Ronaldo, Lionel Messi, Kylian Mbappé, and Mohamed Salah.

Commercially, the song become the fourth FIFA World Cup track to chart on the Billboard Hot 100, and the highest-charting official FIFA World Cup song in UK chart history. (Note: The previous highest-charting official FIFA World Cup song was Shakira's "Waka Waka (This Time for Africa)", featuring Freshlyground, which peaked at number 21 in 2010.) The song also peaked at number one in Argentina, Austria, Belgium, Colombia, Czech Republic, Ecuador, France, Germany, Greece, Hong Kong, Iceland, India, Italy, the Netherlands, Norway, Poland, Portugal, Slovakia, Sweden, Switzerland, and United Arab Emirates as well as within the top three in Canada, Ireland, Spain, Singapore, and the UK.

== Background and release ==
On 7 May 2026, Shakira posted a short video on her Instagram account which featured the singer holding the official soccer ball of the 2026 FIFA World Cup on the football field of Rio de Janeiro's Maracanã Stadium, announcing the song and its title. On 14 May 2026, it was announced that Shakira, Madonna, and K-pop group BTS would co-headline the FIFA's first final halftime show on 19 July 2026, at MetLife Stadium in East Rutherford, New Jersey.

The song was first released on 15 May 2026 in full audio, followed by the release of the song's music video on 23 May 2026. The song marks the fourth official FIFA World Cup song performed by Shakira and the first since "Dare (La La La)" for the 2014 FIFA World Cup in Brazil. The song is also the official anthem of the Global Citizen Fund for Education of the 2026 FIFA World Cup to ensure that children around the world have readily available access to quality education and sporting activities. A Spanish-language version of the song was released on 23 June 2026.

== Composition ==
The song was written by Shakira and Burna Boy, together with Benny Adam, Jon Bellion, Ed Sheeran, and Alexander Castillo, who produced the song with Shakira. The song was written in five languages: English, Spanish, Italian, French, and Japanese. Its musical influences include Afrobeats, dance-pop, world music, and reggaeton.

The title of the song, "Dai Dai", is in Italian and is a slang exclamation meaning "come on", an exhortation to "give it your all" in a sporting performance.

== Critical reception ==
Billboard listed the song as the third-best song for the 2026 FIFA World Cup, stating that it "blends the musical worlds" of the two artists, with "the artists send a motivational and uplifting message to athletes and fans alike". Marni Rose McFall of Newsweek described the song as "a massive, rhythm‑driven anthem" praising "Shakira's unmistakable flair" and "Burna Boy's Afro fusion mastery".

== Accolades ==
Awards and nominations
Award	Year	Category	Result	Ref.
BreakTudo Awards	2026	International Hit of the Year	Pending	
Grammy Awards	2027	Best Global Music Performance	Pending	
Los 40 Music Awards	2026	Best Song	Pending	
MTV Video Music Awards	2026	Best Collaboration	Nominated	
MTV Video Music Awards	2026	Best Latin	Nominated	
Premios Juventud	2026	OMG Collaboration	Won	

== Commercial performance ==
"Dai Dai" has reached and stayed at number one on the Billboard Global 200 for seven non-consecutive weeks (including four consecutive weeks), becoming Shakira's second number-one song on the chart, after "TQG" with Karol G in 2023, and Burna Boy's first one. The song also peaked at number one on several international charts, including Argentina, Austria, Belgium, France, Germany, Lebanon, Italy, the Netherlands, Norway, Poland, Portugal, Sweden, and United Arab Emirates, and within the top five in Ireland, Spain, and the UK.

In the United States, "Dai Dai" debuted at number 75 on the Billboard Hot 100, becoming the fourth official World Cup song to appear on the chart and making Shakira the first artist to have two official anthems appear on the chart, along with "Waka Waka (This Time for Africa)" from 2010 FIFA World Cup. Following the World Cup final, the song peaked at number 17 on the chart dated 1 August 2026, becoming the highest-charting FIFA World Cup anthem in Billboard Hot 100 history. The song also peaked at number one on the Billboard Latin Airplay, extending Shakira's record for the most number-one songs on the chart for a female artist at 25.

In the United Kingdom, "Dai Dai" debuted at number 87 on the Official Singles Chart on 18 June 2026. In its seventh week on the chart, the song reached number five, becoming Shakira's seventh song to enter the top ten, the first since "She Wolf" peaked at number four in 2009, and Burna Boy's fifth top ten song. Following the World Cup final, the song peaked at number two for two consecutive weeks behind Sam Fender and Olivia Dean's collaboration "Rein Me In". It became Shakira's highest placement on the UK Singles Chart since "Beautiful Liar" with Beyoncé in 2007.

In Australia, "Dai Dai" reached the top ten for the week ending 31 July 2026. It became Shakira's highest placement on the chart since she reached number five in 2007 with "Beautiful Liar" with Beyoncé and Burna Boy's first appearance on the chart in his career.

In Germany, the song peaked at number one on the GfK Entertainment charts, becoming Shakira's fifth song to reach the top spot. On 6 August 2026, the song was named as the "Song of the Summer" by the GfK, for topping the official chart for over five weeks.

== Live performances ==
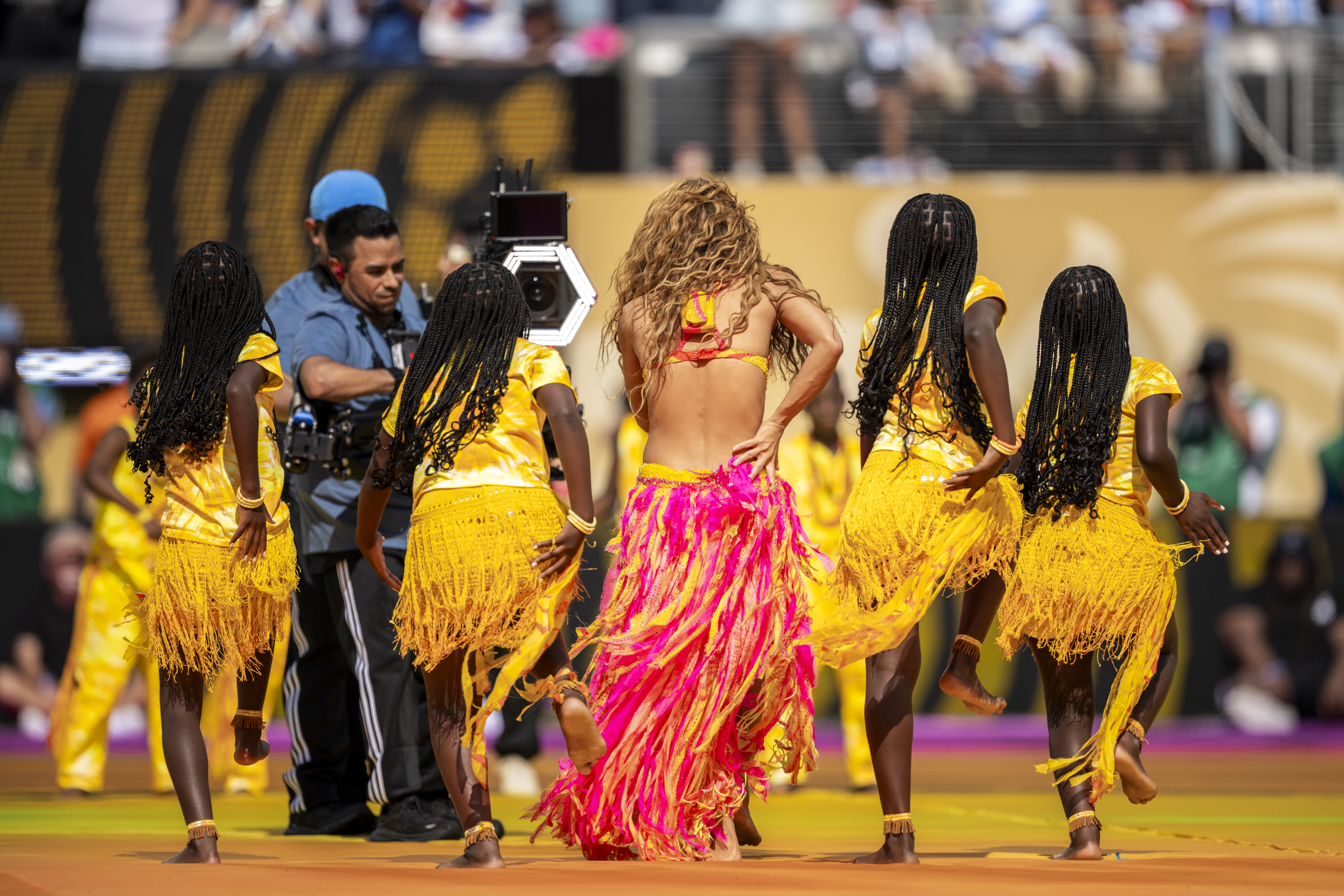
Shakira performing "Dai Dai" with the Ghetto Kids at the 2026 FIFA World Cup final halftime show at MetLife Stadium in New Jersey.

On 11 June 2026, Shakira and Burna Boy performed the song live during the opening ceremony of the World Cup in Mexico City. The song was then added to the setlist of the Las Mujeres Ya No Lloran World Tour, during the second US leg. Shakira and Burna Boy performed the song again on 19 July 2026, at the 2026 FIFA World Cup final halftime show in East Rutherford, New Jersey, outside New York City, with the Ghetto Kids as backup dancers.

== Music video ==
The music video for the song, directed by Hannah Lux Davis, was filmed in Miami, Florida, and released on 23 May 2026, on the singers' YouTube channel. The music video opens with cameos by footballers including Lionel Messi, Kylian Mbappé, and Erling Haaland. The video also features an animated reconstruction of Shakira standing over Mexico City's Angel of Independence, and ends with a view of a graphically designed Manhattan skyline including the Empire State Building.

Throughout the video, Shakira performs choreographed dance routines with groups of dancers, while Burna Boy appears in separate performance scenes. The choreography incorporates Shakira's established dance styles, including fluid hip movements, body isolations, and Latin pop choreography, alongside movements influenced by African dance traditions that complement Burna Boy's musical style. Large ensemble dance sequences and stadium-inspired formations reinforce the video's celebration of football and international unity.

On September 6, 2026, the music video reached 1 billion views on YouTube, becoming the first music video released in 2026 to do so.

== Charts ==
=== Weekly charts ===
Weekly chart performance
Chart (2026)	Peak position
Argentina (CAPIF)	3
Argentina Hot 100 (Billboard)	1
Australia (ARIA)	10
Australia Hip Hop/R&B (ARIA)	2
Austria (Ö3 Austria Top 40)	1
Austria Airplay (MusicTrace)	1
Belarus Airplay (TopHit)	1
Belgium (Ultratop 50 Flanders)	1
Belgium (Ultratop 50 Wallonia)	1
Bolivia (Billboard)	25
Bolivia Airplay (Monitor Latino)	1
Brazil Hot 100 (Billboard)	27
Bulgaria Airplay (PROPHON)	2
Canada Hot 100 (Billboard)	3
Canada AC (Billboard)	14
Canada CHR/Top 40 (Billboard)	36
Canada Hot AC (Billboard)	38
Central America Airplay (Monitor Latino)	1
Central America + Caribbean Airplay (BMAT)	1
Chile (Billboard)	14
Chile Airplay (Monitor Latino)	1
Colombia Hot 100 (Billboard)	1
Colombia Streaming (Promúsica)	2
CIS Airplay (TopHit)	1
Costa Rica Airplay (FONOTICA)	1
Costa Rica Streaming (FONOTICA)	5
Croatia (Billboard)	13
Croatia International Airplay (Top lista)	1
Czech Republic Airplay (ČNS IFPI)	6
Czech Republic Singles Digital (ČNS IFPI)	1
Denmark (Tracklisten)	5
Denmark Airplay (Tracklisten)	2
Dominican Republic Anglo Airplay (Monitor Latino)	1
Ecuador Streaming (Promúsica)	1
El Salvador Airplay (ASAP EGC)	1
Egypt (IFPI)	14
Estonia Airplay (TopHit)	1
Finland (Suomen virallinen lista)	6
France (SNEP)	1
France Airplay (SNEP)	1
Germany (GfK)	1
Germany Airplay (MusicTrace)	1
Global 200 (Billboard)	1
Greece International (IFPI)	1
Guatemala Airplay (Monitor Latino)	5
Honduras Airplay (Monitor Latino)	4
Hungary (Dance Top 40)	8
Hungary (Rádiós Top 40)	4
Hungary (Single Top 40)	8
Iceland (Billboard)	1
India International (IMI)	1
Israel (Mako Hitlist)	5
Ireland (IRMA)	3
Italy (FIMI)	1
Japan Digital Singles (Oricon)	12
Japan Hot 100 (Billboard)	25
Kazakhstan Airplay (TopHit)	6
Latin America Anglo Airplay (Monitor Latino)	1
Latvia Airplay (LaIPA)	5
Latvia Streaming (LaIPA)	5
Lebanon (Lebanese Top 20)	1
Lithuania (AGATA)	5
Lithuania Airplay (TopHit)	1
Luxembourg (Billboard)	1
Malaysia (IFPI)	8
Malaysia International (RIM)	5
Malta Airplay (Radiomonitor)	5
Mexico Airplay (Monitor Latino)	10
Middle East and North Africa (IFPI)	1
Moldova Airplay (TopHit)	1
Netherlands (Dutch Top 40)	1
Netherlands (Single Top 100)	1
New Zealand (Recorded Music NZ)	13
Nicaragua Airplay (Monitor Latino)	6
Nigeria (TurnTable Top 100)	7
Nigeria Airplay (TurnTable)	3
North Africa (IFPI)	3
North Macedonia Airplay (Radiomonitor)	1
Norway (VG-lista)	1
Norway Airplay (IFPI)	1
Panama International (PRODUCE)	1
Panama Airplay (Monitor Latino)	1
Paraguay Airplay (Monitor Latino)	3
Peru Airplay (Monitor Latino)	5
Peru Streaming (Promúsica)	4
Poland Airplay (OLiS)	2
Poland Streaming (OLiS)	1
Portugal (AFP)	1
Puerto Rico Airplay (Monitor Latino)	2
Romania (Billboard)	5
Romania Airplay (UPFR)	1
Romania Airplay (Media Forest)	1
Romania TV Airplay (Media Forest)	9
Russia Airplay (TopHit)	2
Russia Streaming (TopHit)	31
Saudi Arabia (IFPI)	3
Serbia Airplay (Radiomonitor)	7
Singapore (RIAS)	3
Slovakia Airplay (ČNS IFPI)	1
Slovakia Singles Digital (ČNS IFPI)	1
Slovenia Airplay (Radiomonitor)	3
South Africa Airplay (TOSAC)	9
South Africa Streaming (TOSAC)	6
Spain (Promusicae)	2
Spain Airplay (Promusicae)	1
Suriname (Nationale Top 40)	1
Sweden (Sverigetopplistan)	1
Switzerland (Schweizer Hitparade)	1
Switzerland Airplay (MusicTrace)	1
Turkey International Airplay (Radiomonitor Türkiye)	7
United Arab Emirates (IFPI)	1
Ukraine Airplay (TopHit)	1
UK Singles (Official Charts)	2
Uruguay Airplay (Monitor Latino)	2
US Billboard Hot 100	17
US Adult Contemporary (Billboard)	14
US Adult Pop Airplay (Billboard)	35
US Latin Airplay (Billboard)	1
US Pop Airplay (Billboard)	26
US Rhythmic Airplay (Billboard)	1
US World Digital Song Sales (Billboard)	1
Venezuela Airplay (Record Report)	1
Vietnam Hot 100 (Billboard)	93

Weekly chart performance for other versions
Chart (2026)	Peak position
Greece International (IFPI) Instrumental version	5
Greece International (IFPI) Spanish version	79
Greece International (IFPI) Spinall remix	22
Lithuania (AGATA) Instrumental version	16
Poland Streaming (OLiS) Instrumental version	25
Poland Streaming (OLiS) Portuguese version	42
US Latin Pop Airplay (Billboard) Spanish version	3

=== Monthly charts ===
Monthly chart performance
Chart (2026)	Peak position
Belarus Airplay (TopHit)	1
Brazil Streaming (Pro-Música Brasil)	13
CIS Airplay (TopHit)	1
Estonia Airplay (TopHit)	1
Kazakhstan Airplay (TopHit)	25
Latvia Airplay (TopHit)	32
Lithuania Airplay (TopHit)	3
Moldova Airplay (TopHit)	1
Panama Streaming (PRODUCE)	2
Paraguay Airplay (SGP)	1
Romania Airplay (TopHit)	1
Russia Airplay (TopHit)	6
Russia Streaming (TopHit)	48
Ukraine Airplay (TopHit)	7
Uruguay Streaming (CUD)	5

== Certifications ==
Certifications
Region	Certification	Certified units/sales
Austria (IFPI Austria)	Platinum	30,000^{‡}
Belgium (BRMA)	Gold	20,000^{‡}
Canada (Music Canada)	2× Platinum	160,000^{‡}
Denmark (IFPI Danmark)	Gold	45,000^{‡}
France (SNEP)	Diamond	333,333^{‡}
Germany (BVMI)	Gold	300,000^{‡}
Hungary (MAHASZ)	Platinum	4,000^{‡}
Italy (FIMI)	Gold	100,000^{‡}
New Zealand (RMNZ)	Gold	15,000^{‡}
Poland (ZPAV)	Platinum	125,000^{‡}
Portugal (AFP)	3× Platinum	75,000^{‡}
Spain (Promusicae)	2× Platinum	200,000^{‡}
United Kingdom (BPI)	Gold	400,000^{‡}
United States (RIAA)	19× Platinum (Latin)	1,140,000^{‡}
Streaming
Czech Republic (ČNS IFPI)	Platinum	5,000,000^{†}
Greece (IFPI Greece)	Platinum	2,000,000^{†}
Slovakia (ČNS IFPI)	Platinum	1,700,000^{†}
Sweden (GLF)	Platinum	12,000,000^{†}
^{‡} Sales+streaming figures based on certification alone.^{†} Streaming-only figures based on certification alone.

== Release history ==
Release history for "Dai Dai"
Region	Date	Format	Label	Ref.
Various	15 May 2026	Digital download; streaming	Sony	
Italy	22 May 2026	Radio airplay	Sony	

== See also ==
- List of Billboard Global 200 number ones of 2026
- List of top 10 singles for 2026 in Australia
- List of number-one hits of 2026 (Austria)
- List of Ultratop 50 number-one singles of 2026
- List of number-one hits of 2026 (France)
- List of number-one hits of 2026 (Germany)
- List of German airplay number-one songs of 2026
- List of top 10 singles in 2026 (Ireland)
- List of number-one hits of 2026 (Italy)
- List of Dutch Top 40 number-one singles of 2026
- List of number-one singles of 2026 (Poland)
- List of number-one singles of 2026 (Portugal)
- List of number-one hits of 2026 (Switzerland)
- List of UK top-ten singles in 2026
