= Aalam of God =

Studio album by DJ Khaled
- Released: TBA
- Recorded: 2023–2025
- Genre: Hip-hop
- Labels: We the Best; Republic
- Producers: DJ Khaled; TM88; C$D Sid; Magnificent; Slo Meezy

DJ Khaled chronology
God Did (2022)	Aalam of God (2026)

Singles from Aalam of God
- 1. "You Remind Me" Released: August 28, 2025; 2. "Hot Shot" Released: August 28, 2025; 3. "Brother" Released: August 29, 2025; 4. "One of Them" Released: April 10, 2026

Aalam of God is the upcoming fourteenth studio album by American record producer DJ Khaled. It was scheduled to be released through We the Best Music Group and Republic Records on July 17, 2026; the album was not released on that date. The album reportedly features guest appearances from Burna Boy, Cardi B, Tems, Travis Scott, 21 Savage, Future, Lil Baby, Rick Ross, GloRilla, Jay-Z, Rod Wave, Ozuna and G Herbo among others that are yet to be revealed. Serving as the follow-up to DJ Khaled's previous album, God Did (2022), it is his first project since I Changed a Lot to not be released by Epic Records. Its four-year gap since God Did will mark the longest between albums to date in DJ Khaled's entire career.

== Background and promotion ==
On August 10, 2023, DJ Khaled announced that the title of the album would be titled Til Next Time along with a trailer video. One day later, he released a collaboration with Future and Lil Baby titled "Supposed to Be Loved" featuring Lil Uzi Vert, which was originally supposed to be the lead single from the album. Other guest appearances include Burna Boy, Tems, 21 Savage, Rihanna and Jay-Z.

On February 4, 2025, DJ Khaled announced that the name of the album was no longer Til Next Time but rather Aalam of God. This translates to "the world of God" in Arabic, and also refers to the name of Khaled's younger son. In a press release, Khaled stated: "This is not my last album, it's my Black album," referring to Jay-Z's The Black Album, which was advertised as his final album before retirement. Khaled also released a seven-minute album trailer, directed by Eif Rivera, starring himself alongside Mark Wahlberg and Anthony Ramos. The trailer depicts Khaled protecting the files for his upcoming album from assailants. Wahlberg hints also that Khaled had "another 100-bar [verse] from Jay-Z". Khaled also hinted at a collaboration with Rihanna, reiterating this message on Instagram and tagging record producer Ayo Juan. Khaled used an unreleased snippet from a song believed to be titled "God Is on Our Side" as the soundtrack to the trailer's final scene. He also advised listeners of the album to "listen in order too — from the intro to the outro".

In the trailer, Khaled confirmed that Aalam of God would have two Drake collaborations. Later in the comment section of Khaled's Instagram post of the album trailer, Drake denied his involvement with the album and left a message that read, "Must be @drakebell 😶". Khaled then deleted the album announcement following Drake's message. Drake would later diss Khaled on "Make Them Pay" (2026) for not expressing support for Palestinian liberation amid the Gaza war.

== Track listing ==
Aalam of God track listing
No.	Title	Length

Leftover tracks

- "Supposed to Be Loved" (with Lil Baby and Future featuring Lil Uzi Vert)
