= DNA (More Than a Game) =

Single by Andrea Bocelli, David Guetta, Ejae and Megan Thee Stallion

from the album Official FIFA World Cup 2026 Album (Opening Ceremony Edition)
- Language: English; Italian; Korean
- Released: 10 June 2026
- Genre: EDM; pop rap; hip-house
- Length: 2:56
- Label: Universal; What a DJ; FIFA Sound
- Songwriters: Andrea Bocelli; David Guetta; Kim Eun-jae; Megan Thee Stallion; Giovanni Damiani; Giorgio Tuinfort; Felix Hain; Lucas Hain; Bobby Session Jr.; Ashley Milton; Daniel Goudie; Francesco Pasquero; Norma Jean Martine
- Producers: Guetta; Timofey Reznikov; Damiani; Conor Ross; Fast Boy; Tuinfort

David Guetta singles chronology
"Run Run River (Angels Above Me)" (2026)	"DNA (More Than a Game)" (2026)	"Human" (2026)

Andrea Bocelli singles chronology
"Rimani Qui" (2024)	"DNA (More Than a Game)" (2026)

Ejae singles chronology
"Time After Time" (2026)	"DNA (More Than a Game)" (2026)	"Made My Night" (2026)

Megan Thee Stallion singles chronology
"Motion Party" (Remix) (2026)	"DNA (More Than a Game)" (2026)	"Pink Blush" (Remix) (2026)

2026 FIFA World Cup singles chronology
"Siir Siir" (2026)	"DNA (More Than a Game)" (2026)

Music video
- "DNA (More Than a Game)" on YouTube

"DNA (More Than a Game)" is a song by Italian tenor Andrea Bocelli, French DJ and record producer David Guetta, South Korean and American singer-songwriter Ejae and American rapper Megan Thee Stallion. An EDM, power pop and hip hop song with arena rock elements, it was released on 10 June 2026 as the official anthem of the 2026 FIFA World Cup, and is included in the Official FIFA World Cup 2026 Album (Opening Ceremony Edition).

== Background and release ==
The song was released on 10 June 2026 as the anthem for the 2026 FIFA World Cup, the day prior to the start of the tournament, which took place from 11 June to 19 July 2026. The song featured French DJ and record producer David Guetta, Italian tenor Andrea Bocelli, South Korean-American singer Ejae and American rapper Megan Thee Stallion. The song featured English, Korean and Italian languages.

In a press statement, Bocelli explained the decision to participate in the song and the contributions of the various artists to the collaboration:

Football has been in my life for as long as I can remember, and will always hold a very special place in my heart. To be invited to sing the anthem of the FIFA World Cup and to participate in the opening ceremony is an honor that moves me deeply. It also fills me with immense joy and gratitude, to return to Mexico City, a city that has received me with such extraordinary warmth. And to sing on the Official Anthem alongside EJAE and David Guetta is a collaboration I will truly treasure. To FIFA, to the organisers, and to every fan who will gather in stadiums, living rooms and village squares across the globe, it is for you that we sing.

== Live performance ==
On 11 June 2026, Andrea Bocelli and Ejae performed the song live during the opening ceremony of the World Cup. David Guetta appeared via prerecorded video.

== Charts ==
=== Weekly charts ===
Weekly chart performance
Chart (2026)	Peak position
Austria (Ö3 Austria Top 40)	64
Belgium (Ultratop 50 Wallonia)	35
Chile Anglo Airplay (Monitor Latino)	13
Estonia Airplay (TopHit)	21
Germany (GfK)	71
Global Excl. US (Billboard)	138
Lithuania Airplay (TopHit)	12
Netherlands (Single Tip)	3
New Zealand Hot Singles (RMNZ)	12
Nigeria Airplay (TurnTable)	84
Poland (Polish Airplay Top 100)	27
South Korea (Circle)	195
Sweden (Sverigetopplistan)	68
Switzerland (Schweizer Hitparade)	53
UK Singles Sales (OCC)	18
Uruguay Anglo Airplay (Monitor Latino)	10
US Digital Song Sales (Billboard)	17
US Hot Dance/Electronic Songs (Billboard)	9
Venezuela Anglo Airplay (Monitor Latino)	5

=== Monthly charts ===
Monthly chart performance
Chart (2026)	Peak position
Estonia Airplay (TopHit)	33
Lithuania Airplay (TopHit)	20

== Release history ==
Release history and formats for "DNA (More Than a Game)"
Region	Date	Format	Label	Ref.
Various	10 June 2026	Digital download; streaming	Universal; What a DJ; FIFA Sound	
Italy	16 June 2026	Radio airplay	Island	
