= Radio (Future song) =

2026 single by Future

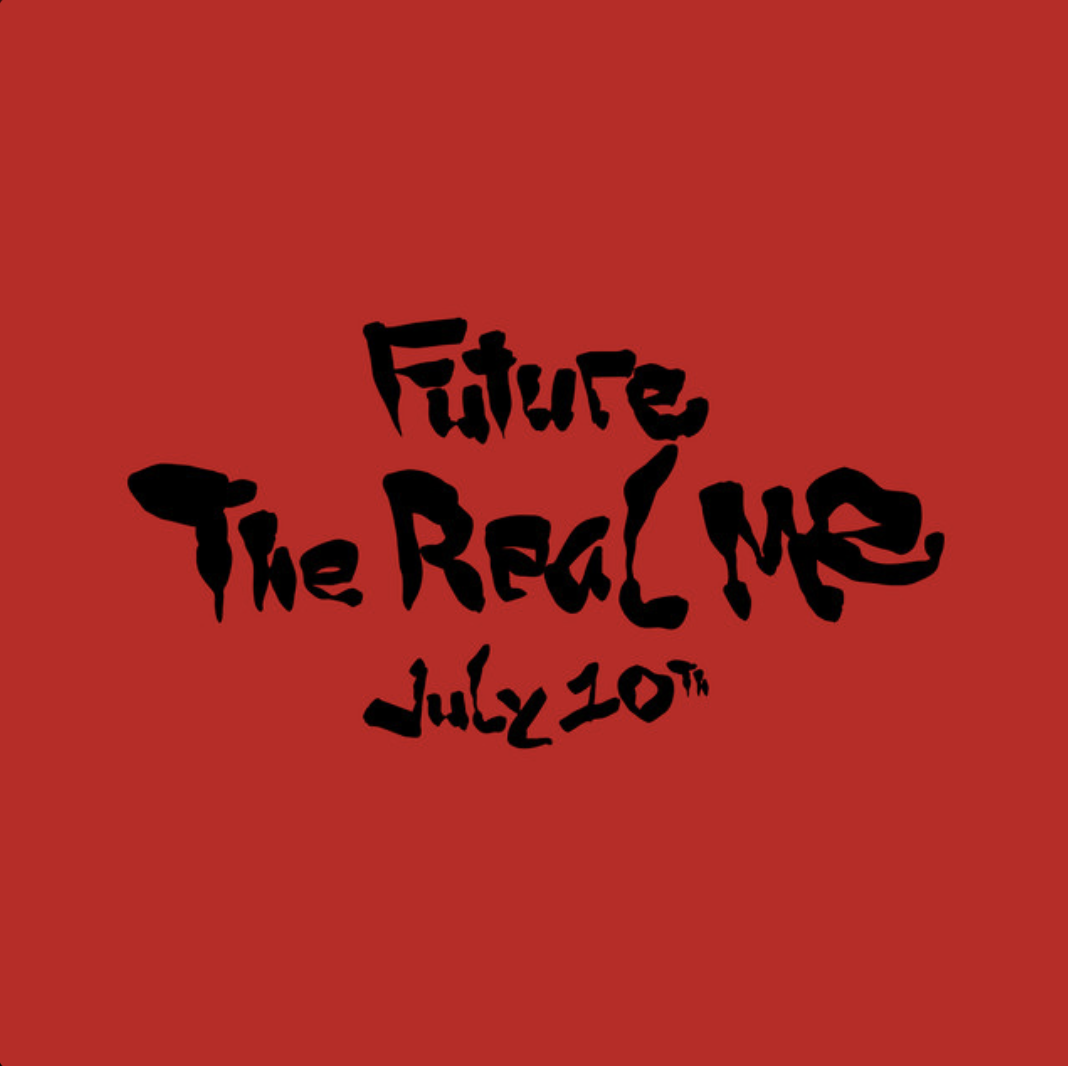

Single by Future

from the album The Real Me
- Released: June 26, 2026
- Length: 2:39
- Label: Freebandz; Epic
- Songwriters: Nayvadius Wilburn; Dylan Cleary; Justin Glass; Taurus Currie; Wesley Glass
- Producers: BabyWave; Dez Wright; Taurus; Wheezy

Future singles chronology
| "Game Time" (2026) | "Radio" (2026) |

Music video
- "Radio" on YouTube

"Radio" is a single by American rapper Future, released as the lead single from his tenth studio album The Real Me (2026), through Freebandz and Epic Records. The single was released alongside a music video on June 26, 2026. The release date for the album was revealed alongside the single's release date, where it was scheduled to be the eleventh track from the album.

== Background ==
On June 25, 2026, Future announced "Radio" as the lead single for The Real Me, with the song releasing the following day and the album scheduled for July 10.

== Charts ==
Chart performance for "Radio"
| Chart (2026) | Peak position |
|---|---|
| New Zealand Hot Singles (RMNZ) | 10 |
| US Billboard Hot 100 | 46 |
| US Hot R&B/Hip-Hop Songs (Billboard) | 18 |
