= Game Time (song) =

Single by Future and Tyla

from the album Official FIFA World Cup 2026 Album
- Released: May 29, 2026
- Genre: Hip-hop; Afrobeats
- Length: 3:27
- Label: SALXCO; Epic; Def Jam
- Songwriters: Nayvadius DeMun Cash; Tyla Laura Seethal; Henry Walter; Jake Torrey; Jessica Agombar; Omer Fedi
- Producer: Cirkut

Future singles chronology
"One of Them" (2026)	"Game Time" (2026)	"Radio" (2026)

Tyla singles chronology
"She Did It Again" (2026)	"Game Time" (2026)	"Is It Love" (2026)

2026 FIFA World Cup singles chronology
"Goals" (2026)	"Game Time" (2026)	"World Cup (Champions)" (2026)

Music video
- "Game Time" on YouTube

"Game Time" is a song by American rapper Future and South African singer-songwriter Tyla, released on May 29, 2026 as the seventh single from the official album of the 2026 FIFA World Cup.

== Background and development ==
It was announced early April that both Tyla and Future will perform at the 2026 FIFA World Cup, opening cerenomy in Los Angeles with Tyla additionally performing in Mexico City. They joined A-list performers like Katy Perry and Shakira amongst others. In early May the FIFA World Cup started announced a compilation soundtrack album featuring artists such as Lisa, Burna Boy and Anitta.

== Promotion ==
In promotion of the song, Tyla teased the collaboration while attending the 2026 Billboard Woman in Music Awards, stating she was working on something big with a one of her favorite rappers. It was later revealed that she and Future would write and perform an original song for the FIFA World Cup Album. An Instagram Reel for the song was posted by FIFA, showing Tyla wearing a soccer jersey with "A-POP" on it with Future rapping in the background.

== Charts ==
Chart performance for "Game Time"
Chart (2026)	Peak position
New Zealand Hot Singles (RMNZ)	11
Nigeria (TurnTable Top 100)	76
Nigeria Airplay (TurnTable)	45
South Africa Streaming (TOSAC)	82
US Bubbling Under Hot 100 (Billboard)	4
US Hot R&B/Hip-Hop Songs (Billboard)	48
US Rhythmic Airplay (Billboard)	37
