= List of FIFA Women's World Cup songs and anthems =

List of anthems of all FIFA Women's World Cups

FIFA Women's World Cup songs and anthems are tunes and songs adopted officially by FIFA (or by official broadcasters and partners selected by FIFA), to be used prior to the event and to accompany the championships during the event. They are also used in advertising campaigns for the World Cup. They are used as theme music in TV broadcast and also used in advertising campaigns for the tournament.

== Official songs and anthems by FIFA ==
Edition	Host country	Title	Language(s)	Performer(s)	Writer(s) and producer(s)
1991	China	"Unknown" or "None"			
1995	Sweden	"Unknown" or "None"			
1999	United States	"Because We Want To"	English	Billie Piper	Dion Rambo, Jacques Richmond, Wendy Page, Jim Marr
2003	United States	"Unknown" or "None"			
2007	China	"世界今天你最美 (Shi Jie Jin Tian Ni Zui Mei/You Are The Most Beautiful In the World Today)"	Chinese	Chen Gang	Chen Gang
2011	Germany	"Happiness (Dave Audé Mix)"	English	Alexis Jordan, Dave Audé	Stargate, Deadmau5
2015	Canada	"Warriors"	English	Imagine Dragons	Alex da Kid
2019	France	"Gloria"	English	Jain	
2023	Australia; New Zealand	"Do It Again" – Official Song	English	Benee (featuring Mallrat)	Josh Fountain and Timon Martin
2023	Australia; New Zealand	"Unity" – Official Anthem	English (Instrumental)	Kelly Lee Owens	Kelly Lee Owens
2023	Australia; New Zealand	"Bring it On!" – Official Pre-Game anthem	English	BIA, Diarra Sylla, Tones And I	RedOne
2027	Brazil	"The Official FIFA Women’s World Cup 2027™ Theme" – Official Anthem	English (Instrumental)	Dennis de Rochemont, Summer San	
2031	Costa Rica; Jamaica; Mexico; United States	TBD	TBD	TBD	TBD
2035	England; Northern Ireland; Scotland; Wales	TBD	TBD	TBD	TBD

== Other notable songs and anthems ==
Edition	Host country	Title	Language(s)	Performer(s)	Writer(s) and producer(s)
1999	United States	"Let's Get Loud" – Closing Ceremony	English	Jennifer Lopez	Emilio Estefan, Kike Santander
2015	Canada	"In Your Shoes" – Opening Ceremony	English	Sarah McLachlan	Sarah McLachlan, Luke Doucet, Pierre Marchand
2015	Canada	"I'm Not Your Hero" – Opening Ceremony	English	Tegan and Sara	Greg Kurstin
2019	France	"Gloria" – Opening Ceremony	English	Jain	Maxim Nucci
2019	France	"Makeba" – Opening Ceremony	French; English	Jain	Maxim Nucci
2019	France	"Heads Up" – Opening Ceremony	English	Jain	Maxim Nucci
2023	Australia; New Zealand	"Vi Gør Det Hele Igen" – Denmark Team Song	Danish	Fräulein, Kvindelandsholdet	Ole Brodersen Meyer
2023	Australia; New Zealand	"Våran sång" – Sweden team song	Swedish	Miss Li	Miss Li, Sonny Gustafsson, Linnea Södahl
2023	Australia; New Zealand	"Copper Queens Anthem" – Zambia team song	Bemba; Nyanja	Xaven, Wezi, Towela	Rachael Victoria Towela
2023	Australia; New Zealand	"Poi Tukua"	Māori; English	Makayla	Makayla Purcell-Mainini, Ji Fraser, Dan Martin
2023	Australia; New Zealand	"Esta X Venir" –Spain team song	Spanish	Farga	Juan Figols, Mario Lázaro, María Talaverano, Elena Farga
2027	Brazil	TBD	TBD	TBD	TBD
2031	Costa Rica; Jamaica; Mexico; United States	TBD	TBD	TBD	TBD
2035	England; Northern Ireland; Scotland; Wales	TBD	TBD	TBD	TBD

== Broadcaster theme music ==
Edition	Host country	Broadcaster	Title	Language(s)	Performer(s)	Writer(s) and producer(s)
1991	China	Global	Untitled or Unknown			
1995	Sweden	Global	Untitled or Unknown			
1999	United States	Global	Untitled or Unknown			
2003	United States	Global	Untitled or Unknown			
2007	China	Global	"Old FIFA Anthem"	Instrumental	Franz Lambert	Franz Lambert
2011	Germany	Global	"Old FIFA Anthem"	Instrumental	Franz Lambert	Franz Lambert
2015	Canada	Global	Untitled or Unknown			
2015	Canada	FOX Sports	"FOX Sports FIFA World Cup Theme"	Instrumental	Pete Calandra	Pete Calandra
2019	France	Global	Untitled or Unknown			
2019	France	BBC	"Remember The Name"	English	Ms. Banks	Takbir Bashir, Ryan Maginn, Mike Shinoda
2019	France	FOX Sports	"FOX Sports FIFA World Cup Theme"	Instrumental	Pete Calandra	Pete Calandra
2019	France	NOS	"Balance ton quoi"	French	Angèle	Angèle Van Laeken
2019	France	NOS	"Ritual"	English	Tiësto, Jonas Blue and Rita Ora	Tiësto, Jonas Blue, Fraser T. Smith, Grace Barker, Stonebank, Wayne Hector
2023	Australia; New Zealand	Global	"Unity"	Instrumental	Kelly Lee Owens	Kelly Lee Owens
2023	Australia; New Zealand	BBC	"Just Move"	English	Pixey	Pixey
2023	Australia; New Zealand	FOX Sports	"FOX Sports FIFA World Cup Theme"	Instrumental	Pete Calandra	Pete Calandra
2023	Australia; New Zealand	ITV	"Into Air"	Instrumental	LUME	LUME
2023	Australia; New Zealand	RTÉ	"Turn the World"	English	Sweetlemondae	Natasha Mbatha, Chris Bubenzer, Percy Chamburuka, Benza
2023	Australia; New Zealand	Telemundo	"Sueño de Campeones"	Spanish	Yoav Goren	Yoav Goren
2027	Brazil	TBD	TBD	TBD	TBD	TBD
2031	Costa Rica; Jamaica; Mexico; United States	TBD	TBD	TBD	TBD	TBD
2035	England; Northern Ireland; Scotland; Wales	TBD	TBD	TBD	TBD	TBD

== Entrance/Pre-Match Protocol music ==
Edition	Host country	Music	Notes
1995	Sweden	"Old FIFA Anthem"	
1999	United States	"Old FIFA Anthem"	
2003	United States	"Old FIFA Anthem"	
2007	China	"Old FIFA Anthem"	
2011	Germany	"Old FIFA Anthem"	
2015	Canada	"Old FIFA Anthem"	
2019	France	"Living Football"	When both teams' national flags and FIFA flag enter the pitch
2019	France	"Seven Nation Army (Instrumental)"	When players and officials enter the pitch
2023	Australia; New Zealand	"Unity"	When both teams' national flags and FIFA flag enter the pitch
2023	Australia; New Zealand	"Bring It On (Ochestral)"	When players and officials enter the pitch
2023	Australia; New Zealand	"Bring It On" (Sweet Dreams Ver.)	Played after the anthems and before-kick off
2027	Brazil	TBD	TBD
2031	Costa Rica; Jamaica; Mexico; United States	TBD	TBD
2035	England; Northern Ireland; Scotland; Wales	TBD	TBD

=== Note ===
This song has two official versions, one that samples Sweet Dreams (Are made of This) and one that doesn't have the samples, the version used for the World Cup had the Sweet Dreams samples

== See also ==
- List of FIFA World Cup songs and anthems
- List of UEFA European Championship songs and anthems
- List of Copa América songs and anthems
- List of Africa Cup of Nations songs and anthems
- List of AFC Asian Cup songs and anthems
- List of Olympic songs and anthems
