= A Tribute to Frank Sinatra =

Studio album by Klaus Wunderlich
- Released: July 15, 1999
- Genres: Traditional pop Jazz
- Label: Conno

A Tribute to Frank Sinatra is a 1999 album by Klaus Wunderlich, that consists of 16 Sinatra tunes.

== Track listing ==
1. "The Lady Is a Tramp" (Richard Rodgers, Lorenz Hart)
2. "Strangers in the Night" (Bert Kaempfert, Charles Singleton, Eddie Snyder)
3. "I Only Have Eyes for You" (Harry Warren, Al Dubin)
4. "Something" (George Harrison)
5. "From Here to Eternity" (Freddy Karger, Robert Wells)
6. "I've Got You Under My Skin" (Cole Porter)
7. "My Way" (Paul Anka, Claude Francois, Jacques Revaux, Gilles Thibaut)
8. "Downtown" (Tony Hatch)
9. "Theme from New York, New York" (Fred Ebb, John Kander)
10. "Something Stupid" (Carson Parks)
11. "Someone to Watch Over Me" (George Gershwin, Ira Gershwin)
12. "What Now My Love" (Gilbert Bécaud, Pierre Leroyer, Carl Sigman)
13. "Autumn in New York" (Vernon Duke)
14. "Night and Day" (Porter)
15. "I'm Getting Sentimental Over You" (George Bassman, Ned Washington)
16. "Just One of Those Things" (Porter)
