= 13th Child =

Thirteenth Child
- Film poster
- Directed by: Thomas Ashley; Steven Stockage
- Written by: Michael Maryk; Cliff Robertson
- Starring: Cliff Robertson; Lesley-Anne Down; Christopher Atkins; Robert Guillaume
- Cinematography: Howard Krupa
- Music by: Peter Calandra
- Distributed by: Unipix Entertainment
- Release date: October 25, 2002
- Running time: 99 minutes
- Country: United States
- Language: English
- Budget: $5,000,000

13th Child (or The 13th Child: Legend of the Jersey Devil) is a 2002 direct-to-video horror film directed by Thomas Ashley and Steven Stockage. It is inspired by the Jersey Devil. The screenplay was written by Michael Maryk and Cliff Robertson, the latter also starring in the film. The story is based on The Jersey Devil by James F. McCloy and Ray Miller Jr. The film was shot in New Jersey at Wharton State Forest, Batsto Village, and Hammonton in the Pine Barrens of New Jersey.

== Cast ==
- Cliff Robertson as Mr. Shroud
- Lesley-Anne Down as District-Attorney Murphy
- Christopher Atkins as Ron
- Robert Guillaume as Riley
- John Wesley as Jones
- Peter Jason as Coroner

== Reception ==
Critical reception for the film has been negative. On Rotten Tomatoes the film has a rating of 40% based on 5 reviews. David N. Butterworth panned the film, as he felt that "Anyone who quickly denounced Madonna's "Swept Away" as being the worst film of 2002 clearly hadn't seen "13th Child."" Charles Tatum from eFilmCritic.com panned the film's script, and character development.
