= John Wesley (actor) =

American actor (1947–2019)

- Publicity Photo of John Wesley
- Born: August 3, 1947; Lake Charles, Louisiana
- Died: September 7, 2019 (aged 72)
- Occupation: Actor
- Years active: 1968–2019

John Wesley (August 3, 1947 – September 7, 2019) was an American actor who worked in many television series, including The Fresh Prince of Bel Air, In The Heat of the Night (TV series) and in Superhuman Samurai Syber-Squad, where he played the role of Principal Pratchert. He also had roles in many feature films as well as theater productions.

He was Mr. Jim on the series Martin for 3 seasons, and was the series regular "Sweets Walker" on Dirty Dancing, the television series. He has also appeared in numerous commercials and voiceovers including "Rafaki". His first main film role was as Franklin in Missing in Action 2: The Beginning starring Chuck Norris but his first credited film role was in the 1968 Clint Eastwood western Hang 'Em High. Wesley was also an award-winning stage actor and a Vietnam veteran.

Wesley earned degrees from the University of California, San Diego graduate acting program and the University of San Diego.

== Death ==
Wesley died on September 7, 2019, from complications of multiple myeloma, five weeks after his 72nd birthday.

== Filmography ==
| Year | Title | Role | Notes |
|---|---|---|---|
| 1968 | Hang 'Em High | Guard #3 | |
| 1968 | Uptight | Larry | |
| 1975 | Bogard | Ira | |
| 1985 | Missing in Action 2: The Beginning | Franklin | |
| 1985 | Perfect | Eddie | |
| 1985 | Highway to Heaven | Ted Tilley Jr. | |
| 1986 | Let's Get Harry | Mercenary #4 | |
| 1987 | Nuts | Holding Cell Guard | |
| 1988 | Moving | Roy Hendersen | |
| 1988 | Jack's Back | Sam Hilliard | |
| 1989 | Out Cold | Cop #2 | |
| 1991 | Nothing but Trouble | Sam | |
| 1991 | Raw Nerve | The Band - New Power | |
| 1992 | Stop! Or My Mom Will Shoot | Tony | |
| 1993 | Born Yesterday | Sen. Welch | |
| 1994 | The Little Rascals | Amish Man #2 | |
| 1998 | I Got the Hook Up | Minister | |
| 1999 | The Wood | Police Officer | |
| 2002 | 13th Child | Jones | |
| 2009 | The Twenty | George | |
| 2010 | Beneath the Blue | Doctor | |
| 2012 | The Undershepherd | Steven Parker | |
| 2016 | The Midnighters | Chester | |
| 2018 | Holly Day | Jerry | |
