= List of UEFA European Championship songs and anthems =

UEFA European Championship songs and anthems are songs and tunes adopted officially to be used as warm-ups to the event, to accompany the championships during the event and as a reminder of the events as well as for advertising campaigns leading the European Championship, giving the singers world coverage.

The songs chosen are usually multilingual using English, the language of the official language of the organising country as well as other world languages, most notably Spanish. The official versions also results in cover versions in many other languages by the original artist or by local artists.

== Official, opening and closing ceremony songs and anthems ==
Championship	Host country	Title	Language	Performer(s)	Writer(s) & producer(s)	Audios & videos	Live performance
1980	Italy	"Goal"	English	Eurokids	Gordon Faggetter, Paolo Dossena, Luigi Lopez, Italo Greco	Music Video	
1984	France	"En avant le foot"	French	Yves de Roubaix	Christian Blachas, Patrick Joly, Paroles Claude Michel	Audio	
1988	West Germany	"Das Tor"	German	Peter Behrens	Tom Dokoupil	Music Video	
1992	Sweden	"More Than a Game"	English	Towe Jaarnek & Peter Jöback	Peter Jöback and Lasse Holm	Music Video	
1996	England	"We're in This Together"	English	Simply Red	Mick Hucknall and Stewart Levine	Official Music Video	
2000	Netherlands; Belgium	"Campione 2000"	English	E-Type	E-Type, Rick Blaskey, Kent Brainerd	Official Music Video	
2004	Portugal	"Força"	English; Portuguese	Nelly Furtado	Nelly Furtado, Gerald Eaton, Brian West	Official Music Video	
2008	Austria; Switzerland	"Can You Hear Me"	English	Enrique Iglesias	Enrique Iglesias, Steve Morales, Frankie Storm; Big Ben Diehl, Carlos Paucar	Official Music Video	
2012	Poland; Ukraine	"Endless Summer"	English	Oceana	Oceana Mahlmann, Marc F. Jackson; Andreas Litterscheid, Blair Mackichan, Hugo Oscar; Reinhard Raith, Mense Reents, Jakobus Siebels	Official Music Video	
2016	France	"This One's for You"	English	David Guetta featuring Zara Larsson	David Guetta, Giorgio Tuinfort, Afrojack, Ester Dean	Official Music Video	Opening Ceremony Closing Ceremony
2020	Europe	"We Are the People"	English	Martin Garrix featuring Bono and the Edge	Martin Garrix, Albin Nedler, Kristoffer Fogelmark; Bono, the Edge, Giorgio Tuinfort, Simon Edmund Carmody	Official Music Video	Opening Ceremony
2024	Germany	"Fire"	English	Meduza, OneRepublic & Leony	Mattia Vitale, Simon de Jano, Luca De Gregorio, Ryan Tedder, Kim Petras, Leonie Burger, Brent Kutzle, Josh Varnadore, VitaliZe & Tyler Spry	Official Music Video	Closing Ceremony
2028	United Kingdom; Ireland	TBD	TBD	TBD	TBD		
2032	Italy; Turkey	TBD	TBD	TBD	TBD		

== Broadcast theme music ==
While usually most music used at the tournament is a UEFA Euro official theme song, in some cases broadcasters will use other songs. The following is a list of these aforementioned songs.

Edition	Host country	Broadcaster	Song title	Languages/instrumental	Performers	Writing and producing
2008	Austria; Switzerland	NOS	"Wänn nit jetzt wänn dä"	Swiss German	Sina	Sina, Pele Loriano
2008	Austria; Switzerland	NOS	"Just For Tonight"	English	One Night Only	George Craig, Daniel Parkin, Jack Sails, Sam Ford, Mark Hayton
2012	Poland; Ukraine	ESPN	"ESPN Soccer Theme"	Instrumental		Lisle Moore, Judd Maher
2012	Poland; Ukraine	BBC	"Escape"	Instrumental		Craig Armstrong
2012	Poland; Ukraine	ITV	"Peter and the Wolf"	Instrumental		Sergei Prokofiev
2012	Poland; Ukraine	NOS	"Happy Jack"	English	Rilan & the Bombardiers	R. Ramhane, M. van der Winkel, N. Broos
2012	Poland; Ukraine	NOS	"Feel the Love"	English	Rudimental ft. John Newman	John Newman, Piers Aggett, Amir Amor, Kesi Dryden
2016	France	ESPN	"ESPN Soccer Theme"	Instrumental		Lisle Moore, Judd Maher
2016	France	BBC	"La Foule"	French	Izzy Bizu, BBC Concert Orchestra	Angel Cabral, Ben Foster
2016	France	ITV	"La Mer"	French	Charles Trenet	Charles Trenet, Albert Lasry
2020	Europe	ESPN	"ESPN Soccer Theme"	Instrumental		Lisle Moore; Judd Maher
2020	Europe	BBC	"Force Majeure"	Instrumental	Gaspard Auge	Gaspard Auge, Victor Le Masne, Michael Declerck
2020	Europe	ITV	"You Ain't The Problem"	English	Michael Kiwanuka	Brian Burton, Dean Josiah Cover, Michael Kiwanuka
2020	Europe	NOS	"The Moment"	English	Remme	Christiaan van der Laan, Gary Go, Isa Azier, Remme ter Haar
2024	Germany	BBC	"Welcome to the DCC" (instrumental)	Instrumental		Dominic Craik, Jonathan Gilmore
2024	Germany	ITV	"The NeverEnding Story"	Instrumental		Giorgio Moroder, Keith Forsey
2024	Germany	Fox Sports	"FOX Sports FIFA World Cup Theme"	Instrumental		Pete Calandra
2024	Germany	NOS	"Mehr davon"	German	Lotte	Charlotte Rezbach, Jens Schneider, Jules Kalmbacher, Philipp Klemz, Joe Walter
2024	Germany	RTVE	"Brillos Platino"	Spanish	Almácor	Arturo Almarcha, Alejandro Capdevila

== Entrance music ==
Championship	Host country	Music	Notes
1992	Sweden		
1996	England		
2000	Netherlands; Belgium		
2004	Portugal		
2008	Austria; Switzerland	"Seven Nation Army"	
2012	Poland; Ukraine	"Heart of Courage"	
2016	France	"This One's for You (Orchestral Version)"	
2020	Europe	"We Are the People (Orchestral Version)"	
2024	Germany	"Fire (Orchestral Version)"	
2028	United Kingdom; Ireland	(to be decided)	
2032	Italy; Turkey	(to be decided)	

== Official albums ==
- 1996 – The Beautiful Game
- 2000 – Euro 2000: The Official Album
- 2004 – Vive O 2004!

== See also ==
- List of FIFA World Cup songs and anthems
- List of Copa América songs and anthems
- List of Africa Cup of Nations songs and anthems
- List of AFC Asian Cup songs and anthems
