= List of AFC Asian Cup songs and anthems =

AFC Asian Cup songs and anthems are songs and tunes adopted officially to be used as warm-ups to the event, to accompany the championships during the event and as a souvenir reminder of the events as well as for advertising campaigns leading for the Asian Cup, giving the singers exceptional universal world coverage and notoriety. However, Asian Cup only started to practice using official songs since 21st century, started in 2004 edition,

Most of the songs representing each Asian Cup tournaments are mainly in English even it can be also multilingual, while some native languages are also used for the song. The official versions also results in cover versions in many other languages by the original artist or by local artists.

Unlike some continental football tournaments such as Copa América or UEFA European Championship, several songs in the Asian Cup might not be official but popular voted and listened, de facto make it official song.

== Official songs and anthems ==
Edition	Host country	Title	Language	Performer(s)	Writer(s) & Producer(s)	Audios & Videos	Live Performance
2004	China	"宣言" (Translated: Declaration): Chinese version	Chinese	Tiger Hu		Audio	
2004	China	"Take Me To The Sky": English version	English	Tiger Hu		Music Video	
2007	Indonesia; Malaysia; Thailand; Vietnam	"I Believe"	English	Tata Young		Official Music Video	
2011	Qatar	"Yalla Asia"	English	Jay Sean; Karl Wolf; Radhika Vekaria	Radhika Vekaria; Max Herman; Zoulikha El Fassi	Official Music Video	
2011	Qatar	Official Song	Arabic, Asian Languages	Group	Abdullah; Al-Mana'ei, Serous	Official Song; Official Music Video	
2015	Australia	"Warrior"	English	Havana Brown	Jonas Saeed, Niclas Kings; Luciana Caporaso; Nick Clow and Sabi	Official Music Video	Opening Ceremony
2019	United Arab Emirates	"Zanaha Zayed" (Roughly translated: Bringing Asia Together)	Arabic; English	Hussain Al Jassmi; Balqees Ahmed Fathi; Eida Al Menhali			Opening Ceremony
2023	Qatar	"Hadaf" (English: A Goal)	Arabic	Humood AlKhudher; Fahad Al Hajjaji		Official Music Video	
2027	Saudi Arabia						

== Entrance music ==
Edition	Host country	Music	Notes
2015	Australia	"AFC Anthem"	Prior to 2015, "FIFA Anthem" was used.
2019	United Arab Emirates	"AFC Anthem"	
2023	Qatar	"Hadaf" (instrumental)	

== See also ==
- List of FIFA World Cup songs and anthems
- List of UEFA European Championship songs and anthems
- List of Copa América songs and anthems
- List of Africa Cup of Nations songs and anthems
