= Warriors (Imagine Dragons song) =

Single by Imagine Dragons
- Released: September 17, 2014
- Genre: Rock; arena rock; industrial rock
- Length: 2:50
- Label: Kidinakorner; Interscope
- Songwriters: A. Grant; Ben McKee; Josh Mosser; Daniel Platzman; Dan Reynolds; Wayne Sermon
- Producers: Imagine Dragons; Alex da Kid

Imagine Dragons singles chronology
"Battle Cry" (2014)	"Warriors" (2014)	"I Bet My Life" (2014)

Music video
- "Warriors" on YouTube

"Warriors" is a song by American pop rock band Imagine Dragons, released on September 18, 2014, designed for the 2014 League of Legends World Championship. The first song designed for a League of Legends World Championship, upon "Warriors", League of Legends began a tradition to release a World Championship song every subsequential year. It also appears on the deluxe edition of the band's second studio album, Smoke + Mirrors (2015). "Warriors" is a rock, arena rock and industrial rock song, written by the band members, Josh Mosser, and Alex da Kid, the latter of whom produced the song along with the band. The lyrics tell a story about "heroes" who built a land "from dust".

The song premiered with its music video on the League of Legends YouTube channel; it showcases a competitive gaming team losing but not giving up until reaching the final. It spent years as the most viewed video on the League of Legends YouTube channel until the music video for "Pop/Stars" by K/DA overtook it. As of 2024, it was the most-viewed League of Legends World Championship music video. "Warriors" is a fan-favorite among the World Championship songs and has placed highly on various rankings of them by publications. It has also been used in various media, including films and TV shows, and was the official anthem for the 2015 FIFA Women's World Cup. In 2020, League of Legends premiered its tenth season by releasing a cover of "Warriors" with 2WEI and Edda Hayes.

== Background ==
"Warriors" was written by Imagine Dragons members Dan Reynolds, Wayne Sermon, Ben McKee, and Daniel Platzman, along with Josh Mosser and British record producer Alex da Kid, and produced by the band and Alex da Kid. It was designed as a collaboration with the multiplayer online battle arena game League of Legends, which was the band's favorite game at the time, while the band was taking a break from working on their second studio album, Smoke + Mirrors (2015). "Warriors" served as the anthem for the game's 2014 World Championship. "Warriors" was the first song designed for a League of Legends World Championship, and upon it, League of Legends began a tradition to release a World Championship song each subsequent year.

"Warriors" was officially released as a single on September 18, 2014, through Kidinakorner and Interscope Records. Upon its release, Riot Games posted on their site regarding the song, "To kick off the start of the action, we set out to craft a war cry to rally behind in a creative collaboration with Imagine Dragons. Whether you're a solo queue warrior or fighting off the LCS jitters –- every moment counts." The song also appears on the deluxe version of Smoke + Mirrors.

In a 2021 interview with NME after the band released "Enemy" as a second collaboration with Riot Games for the League of Legends-adaptive show Arcane, Reynolds said that working with Riot Games "just came out organically" while playing for the 2014 World Championship in Seoul. He also explained that "Nothing was forced, it was just fun. Playing Worlds was some of my favourite memories".

== Composition ==
"Warriors" is an "anthemic" and "constantly building" rock, arena rock, and industrial rock song that is two minutes and 50 seconds long. According to Universal Music Publishing Group's sheet music at Musicnotes.com, it is in E minor with a driving tempo and a 2 feel, with a metronome of 152 beats per minute. Reynolds' vocals range two octaves throughout the song, from B3 to B5. Alan Wen of NME said that it "has the vibe of a tournament anthem", while Ashima Grover of LeisureByte described the song as a "Herculean track". For Diffuser, Chuck Armstrong called the song "grandiose", featuring "hard-hitting" pianos and symphonic orchestral elements and said that it could be a "'let's get pumped up' jam". It is also the only World Championship song to include a guitar solo as of 2024.

Lyrically, "Warriors" tells a story about "heroes" who built a land "from dust". It "speak[s] to and speak[s] about both pro players and League of Legends players", which has been described as what sets itself apart from other World Championship songs. The song opens with the line "As a child, you would wait / And watch from far away", which Amanda "Tania Mae" Tan of ONE Esports called "incredibly powerful". Other lyrics include "We are the warriors that built this town / From dust" and "Will come / When you'll have to rise".

== Music video ==
"Warriors" premiered with the debut of its music video on the League of Legends YouTube channel on September 17, 2014 for the 2014 League of Legends World Championship. The music video showcases a team losing in competitive games but not giving up as they do so until reaching the final. The scene aligned with the second verse of the song was particularly noted for involving two teams competing on opposite sides of a table on Summoner's Rift, "a perfect reflection of 90s LAN gaming culture".

The music video was the most-viewed video on the League of Legends channel for years until April 2019, when it was surpassed by the music video for "Pop/Stars" by K/DA, which had over 215 million views at the time while "Warriors" had over 214 million. By 2021, the music video had received over 336 million views, which at the time, was still the most views on a League of Legends World Championship song, and it was still the most views on a League of Legends World Championship song as of October 2024. As of March 2026, it has over 451 million views.

== Reception ==
"Warriors" is a fan-favorite among the League of Legends World Championship songs. Grover called it one of the game's songs that "still reign supreme", saying that it "sticks the landing" and is "one of the grandest songs to invoke goosebumps". In a 2025 ranking of the World Championship songs, members of the Esports.gg staff ranked it the third-best World Championship song out of the ones from 2014 to 2024, saying that it is "timeless", a "classic", and "an anthem that has stood the test of time", with members praising its build-up, chorus, and lyrics. Cecilia Ciochetti of Dot Esports also ranked it third for the same ranking, highlighting its "brooding undertone" and lyrics, and saying that the song's "spirit never dies".

ONE Esports ranked "Warriors" first in a 2024 ranking of the World Championship anthems, with Kristine "Kurisu" Tuting saying that "Even after more than a decade, admit it you keep coming back to this classic". Tan similarly called it the best World Championship anthem and explained that every following World Championship anthem made her go back to "Warriors". She praised the song's lyrics for being a "true reflection of the League of Legends grassroots scene" when "Warriors" was released.

For Fanbyte, Victoria Rose named "Warriors" the best of the first six World Championship anthems, saying "You absolutely cannot go wrong with something simple and universally powerful. That's what makes 'Warriors' so damn good." She emphasized by calling it "perfectly simplistic" and "a perfect stadium anthem". Esports Insider also ranked the song first place in a 2025 ranking, calling it "iconic" and saying it "suits its role as a LoL Worlds theme [very well]", and saying that its lyrics are "about as epic as they come" and that the song "is enough to get even the most blasé people hyped up". They also praised its music video as "inspirational".

== Usage in media ==
"Warriors" was used in the trailer for the 2015 film The Divergent Series: Insurgent and the final trailer for the 2017 film Wonder Woman. Slate's Matthew Dessem said regarding the latter trailer that "World War I [...] was decidedly less badass than an Imagine Dragons song, perhaps because Wonder Woman wasn't there" and that the Wonder Woman trailer would "seamlessly" blend in with other DC films by using the song in the trailer. The song also appears in the South Korean horror show Sweet Home. Alice O'Connor of Rock Paper Shotgun said that the song worked as "the show's anthem for heroic moments".

"Warriors" was the official anthem for the 2015 FIFA Women's World Cup. WWE Network also used the song as the official theme song for the WWE's Survivor Series 2015. Additionally, the song was used as the soundtrack for the WWE Backlash 2025 between John Cena and Randy Orton.

=== Usage by other artists ===
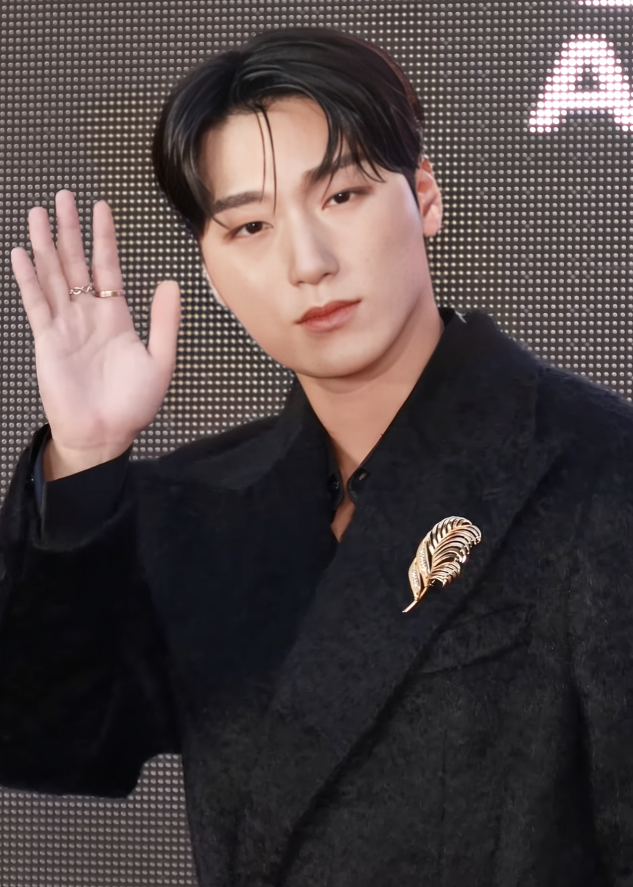
San (pictured) of Ateez released his own dance performance to "Warriors" in 2023.

In October 2023, San of South Korean boy band Ateez released a dance performance to "Warriors" to the group's channel. Choreography for the performance was also provided by BBtrippin and Tarzan. In the performance, San makes "powerful" moves and facial expressions to "establish the vibe and fervour of the song's vibe". The performance was met with praise from the group's fans, who compared his dancing to Ryomen Sukuna of Jujutsu Kaisen and said that it "can stand out as a music video on its own". Grover called it a "ferocious anthem" and remarked that "Even without the ATEEZ members by his side, his power-hungry roar can be heard from a distance". In December 2023, San also called "Warriors" one of his top picks for songs to listen to while traveling.

Chrissy Costanza of Against the Current sung a medley of "Warriors" along with the 2019 World Championship song "Phoenix" and the 2017 World Championship song "Legends Never Die", the latter two of which she both performed in, to open the final of the 2025 World Championship.

== 2WEI and Edda Hayes version ==
In 2020, League of Legends collaborated with German composer team 2WEI and Edda Hayes for a cinematic music video with a cover of "Warriors" to begin the game's tenth season. The cover was described as "grim, choral, and bwampy", as well as "slow and melodramatic".

The music video begins with three concurrent scenes: a battle in a castle, a brawl in a building, and a creature-produced artifact. Throughout, it includes nine prior League of Legends champions with their own mini-stories. The video involves League of Legends characters Jayce, Lux, and Galio teaming up to win against Sylas and his followers. It also sees Marksman Champions Ezreal and Kai'Sa fight against various creatures and Vi be assisted by Cailyn for her sniper skills. Turing called the video "absolutely spine-tingling" and that "Hayes' powerful vocals + 2WEI's composition = eargasm" when writing about the cover for ONE Esports. Despite his minimal experience with League of Legends, Robert N. Adams of GameRevolution praised the video as "some of the finest animation [he had] seen repping a video game in recent memory".

== Credits and personnel ==
Credits adapted from Apple Music and Spotify.

Imagine Dragons

- Dan Reynolds – lead vocals, songwriter, producer
- Wayne Sermon – guitar, songwriter, producer
- Ben McKee – bass guitar, keyboards, songwriter, producer
- Daniel Platzman – drums, percussion, songwriter, producer

Additional personnel

- Christian Linke – string instrument, engineering
- Josh Mosser – songwriter, recording
- A. Grant – songwriter, producer
- Sebastien Najand – orchestrator
- Joe LaPorta – mastering
- Manny Marroquin – mixing
- Robert Root – engineering

== Chart performance ==
=== Weekly charts ===
Chart (2014–2015)	Peak position
Austria (Ö3 Austria Top 40)	56
Canada Hot 100 (Billboard)	60
Czech Republic Singles Digital (ČNS IFPI)	18
France (SNEP)	48
Germany (GfK)	58
Hungary (Single Top 40)	34
Hungary (Stream Top 40)	3
Ireland (IRMA)	80
Lebanon (Lebanese Top 20)	16
Netherlands (Single Top 100)	66
Norway (VG-lista)	27
Sweden (Sverigetopplistan)	7
UK Singles (Official Charts)	54
US Bubbling Under Hot 100 (Billboard)	2
US Hot Rock & Alternative Songs (Billboard)	10

=== Year-end charts ===
Chart (2014)	Position
US Hot Rock & Alternative Songs (Billboard)	68
Chart (2015)	Position
US Hot Rock & Alternative Songs (Billboard)	83

== Certifications ==
Region	Certification	Certified units/sales
Brazil (Pro-Música Brasil)	3× Platinum	180,000^{‡}
Denmark (IFPI Danmark)	Platinum	90,000^{‡}
Germany (BVMI)	Gold	200,000^{‡}
Italy (FIMI)	Gold	25,000^{‡}
New Zealand (RMNZ)	Platinum	30,000^{‡}
Norway (IFPI Norway)	Platinum	10,000^{‡}
Spain (Promusicae)	Platinum	60,000^{‡}
Sweden (GLF)	2× Platinum	80,000^{‡}
United Kingdom (BPI)	Platinum	600,000^{‡}
United States (RIAA)	2× Platinum	2,000,000^{‡}
Streaming
Denmark (IFPI Danmark)	Gold	1,300,000^{†}
^{‡} Sales+streaming figures based on certification alone.^{†} Streaming-only figures based on certification alone.
