= Wersi =

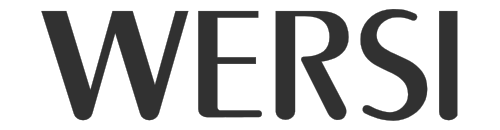
Modern logo of the company

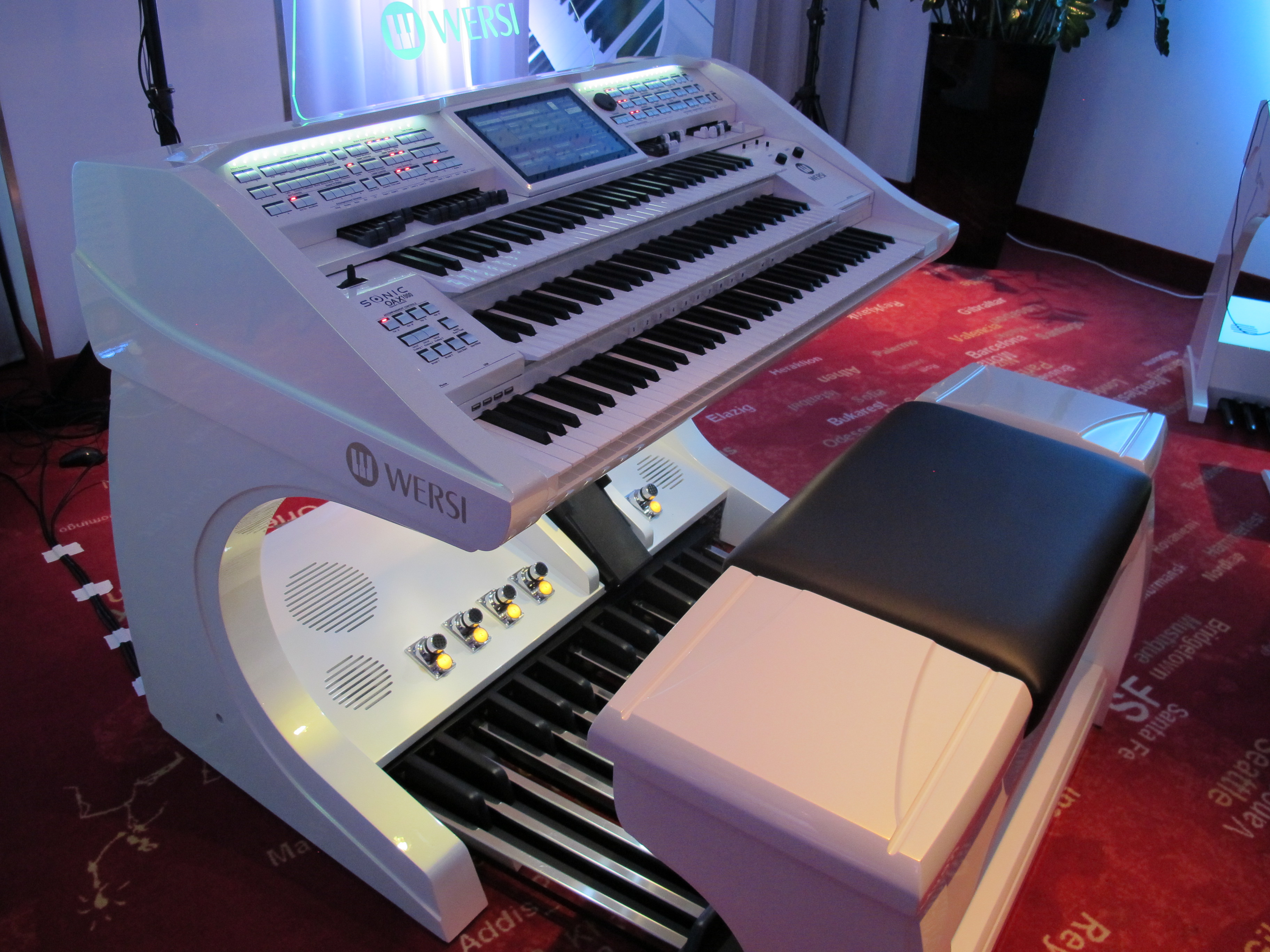
Wersi Sonic OAX1000 (since 2015)

Wersi is a German manufacturer of electronic organs, keyboards, and pianos. It is named after the communes of Werlau and Simmern in Rhineland-Palatinate. They were used by organists such as Franz Lambert and Klaus Wunderlich.

The brand's current range of instruments uses the Open-Architecture-System (OAS), which is a GUI that runs using a Windows XP computer, enabling the keyboard to support third-party programs, such as music notation programs, software synthesizers, and digital audio workstations.

== History ==
Wersi was established in 1969 by two brothers, Wilhelm-Erich Franz and Reinhard Franz, near Rhein-Hunsrück-Kreis, Germany. They built the company's first instruments in the basement of their parents' house. Below is a timeline of the company's development:

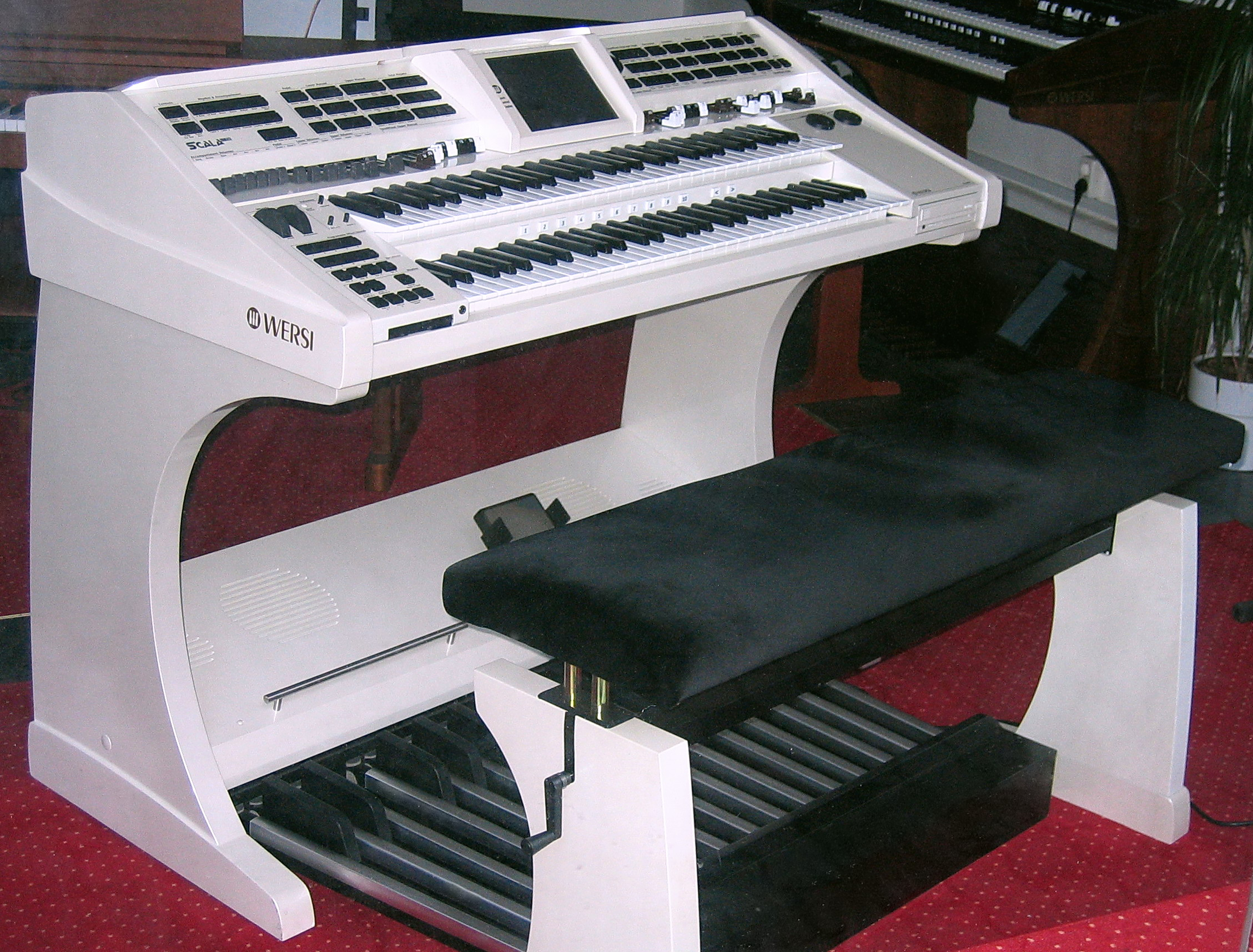
Wersi Scala (OAS series)

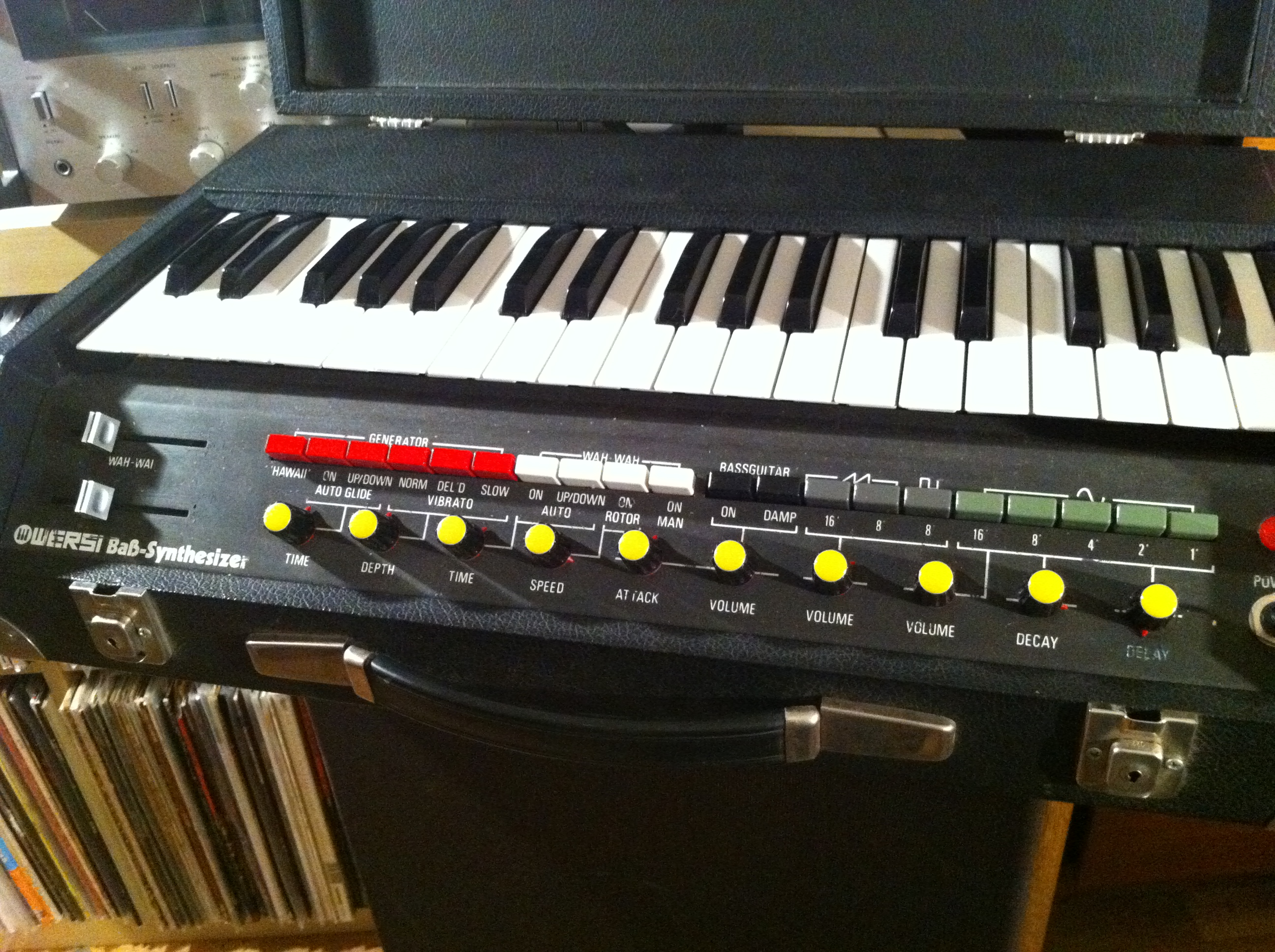
Wersi Baß Synthesizer kit (c.1977)

- In the 1970s, the company established a successful kit development system, which allowed customers to build instruments in their own home.
- In the 1980s, two factories were constructed in the Wersi-hometown of Halsenbach, Rhineland-Palatinate.
- In the 1990s, Wersi developed the digital Grand Piano line as well as digital sample based instruments.
- In the late 1990s, Wersi developed the OX7 drawbar module.
- In 2010, Wersi was purchased by both Medeli (a Chinese musical instruments producer) and Music Store Professional GmbH (the largest music store in Europe), and the latter became the official distributor of Wersi instruments.
- In April 2011, the Pegasus Wing keyboard was launched at the Musikmesse Frankfurt. This event was the world premiere of the new Wersi keyboard line, made in the facilities of Chinese keyboard manufacturer Medeli. Wersi organs are still assembled in Germany, and development has been moved to the Music Store facility in Cologne.
