= List of Copa América songs and anthems =

Copa América songs and anthems are songs and tunes adopted officially to be used as warm-ups to the event, to accompany the championships during the event and as a souvenir reminder of the events as well as for advertising campaigns leading for the Copa América, giving the singers exceptional universal world coverage and notoriety.

== Official songs and anthems ==
Year	Host country	Title	Language	Performer(s)	Writer(s) & producer(s)	Audios & videos	Live performance
2004	Peru	"Más Allá de los Sueños""	Spanish	Gian Marco		Audio; Music Video	
2007	Venezuela	"Gol": Official Song	Spanish	Juan Carlos Luces		Audio	Opening Ceremony
2007	Venezuela	"Baila la Copa": Official Anthem	Spanish	OSE			
2011	Argentina	"Creo en América"	Spanish	Diego Torres		Official Music Video	
2015	Chile	"Al Sur del Mundo"	Spanish	Noche de Brujas		Official Music Video	
2016	United States	"Superstar"	English; Spanish	Pitbull; Becky G		Official Music Video	
2019	Brazil	"Vibra Continente"	Spanish	Léo Santana; Karol G		Official Music Video	
2021	Brazil	"La Gozadera"	Spanish	Gente de Zona		Official Music Video	
2024	United States	"Puntería"	Spanish	Shakira; Cardi B		Official Music Video	

== Entrance music ==
Year	Host country	Music	Notes
2004	Peru		
2007	Venezuela		
2011	Argentina		
2015	Chile		
2016	United States		
2019	Brazil	Conmebol Song	The song doesn't have an official name, but is often used for Copa America and CONMEBOL Sudamericana since 2019 Copa America for Player Entrances, TV Intros and Promos
2021	Brazil	Conmebol Song	The song doesn't have an official name, but is often used for Copa America and CONMEBOL Sudamericana since 2019 Copa America for Player Entrances, TV Intros and Promos
2024	United States	Conmebol Song	The song doesn't have an official name, but is often used for Copa America and CONMEBOL Sudamericana since 2019 Copa America for Player Entrances, TV Intros and Promos

== See also ==
- List of FIFA World Cup songs and anthems
- List of UEFA European Championship songs and anthems
- List of Africa Cup of Nations songs and anthems
- List of AFC Asian Cup songs and anthems
