= Franz Lambert =

German composer and organist

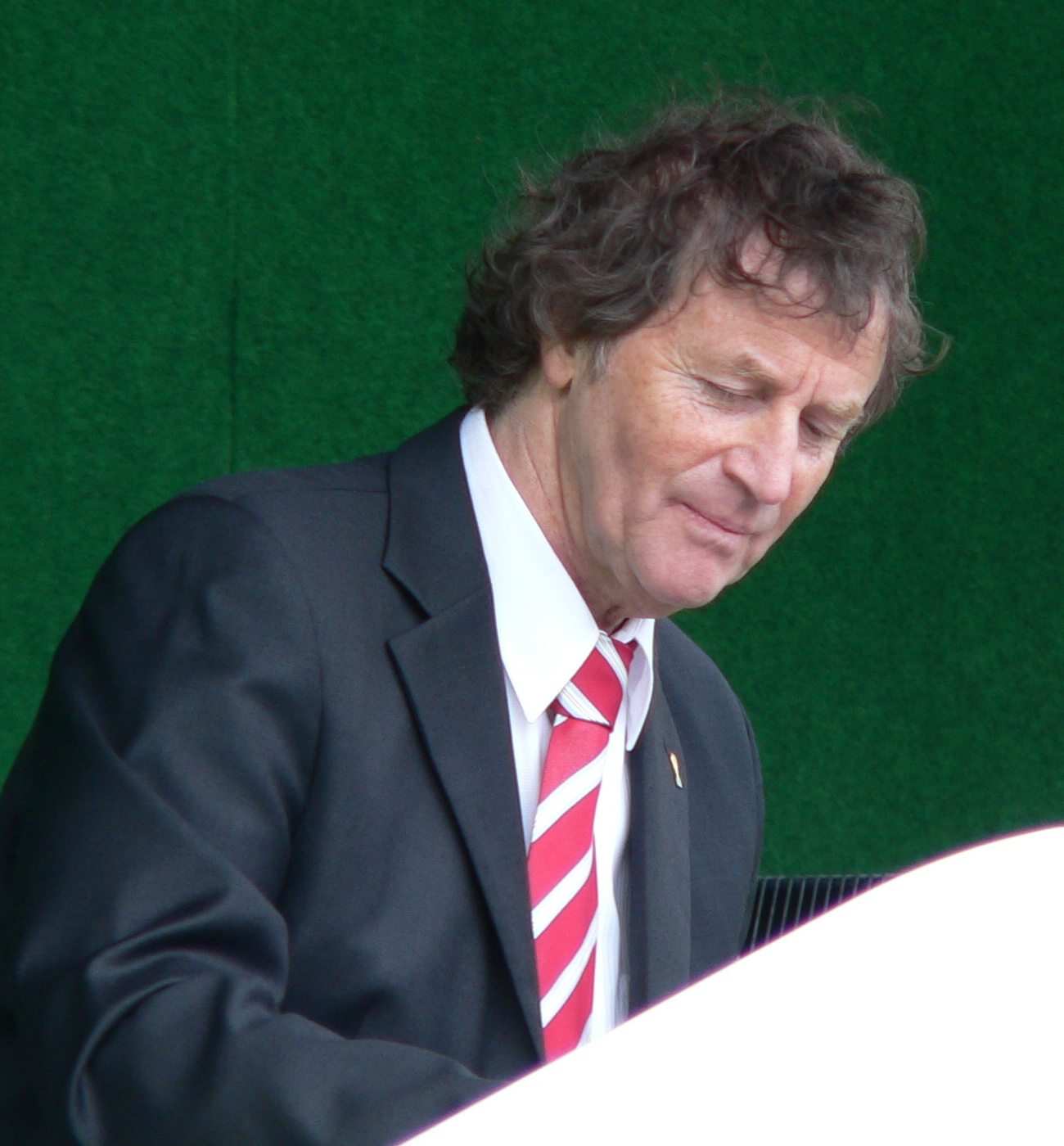
Franz Lambert

Franz Lambert (born 11 March 1948) is a German composer and organist. He is an avid Hammond organ player; however, he is more noted in later years for playing the Wersi range of electronic organs. During his career he has released over 100 albums.

Born in Heppenheim, Germany, his first notable public appearance was in 1969 in the German TV show Zum Blauen Bock, after which he received his first publishing contract. He has played for several celebrities, including King Charles III and Helmut Schmidt.

One of his works is the "FIFA Anthem", which was first played at the 1994 FIFA World Cup. It continues to be played at all FIFA-organized games and tournaments when the teams enter the pitch.

Franz Lambert lives with his wife and two children in Heppenheim-Sonderbach, Hesse, Germany.

== Discography ==
=== 1969-1980 ===
Title	Type	Order number	Label	Year	Cover
Happy Hammond	LP		Fontana	1969	Cover
Happy Hammond	MC		Fontana	1969	
Happy Hammond 2	LP		Fontana	1970	Cover
Happy Hammond 2	MC		Fontana	1970	
Hammond Hitparade	LP		Fontana	1970	Cover
Hammond Hitparade	MC		Fontana	1970	
Hammond Hitparade 2	LP		Fontana	1970	Cover
Hammond Hitparade 2	MC		Fontana	1970	
Hammond Hitparade 3	LP		Fontana	1971	Cover
Hammond Hitparade 3	MC		Fontana	1971	
25 Hammond World Hits	LP		Fontana	1971	Cover
Hammond Hitparade 4	LP		Fontana	1972	Cover
Happy Hammond	MC	819 375-4	Karussell	1972	
Happy Hammond Vol. I	LP		Fontana	1973	Cover
Happy Hammond Vol. II	LP		Fontana	1973	
Happy Hammond Vol. III	LP		Fontana	1973	Cover
Happy Hammond 3	LP		Fontana	1973	Cover
Hammond Hitparade 5	LP		Fontana	1973	Cover
Hammond Hitparade 6	LP	6434146	Fontana	1973	Cover
Hammond Hitparade 6	MC	7172085	Fontana	1973	
The golden Hammond Show	LP		Luxor Gold	1973	Cover
King of Hammond – 56 Evergreens	Album	6623122	Philips	1974	Cover
King of Hammond – 56 Evergreens	LP doppel	9199696–97	Philips	1974	
King of Hammond – 56 Evergreens	MC	7581499	Philips	1974	
Hammond Hitparade 7	LP		Fontana	1974	Cover
Hammond Hitparade 8	LP		Fontana	1974	Cover
Organ in Concert – Franz Lambert an der Wersi-Orgel	LP	9294038	Fontana	1974	Cover
Organ in Concert – Franz Lambert an der Wersi-Orgel	MC	7172206	Fontana	1974	Cover
Organ in Concert – Presents Franz Lambert	LP		Philips	1974	Cover
Hammond fire – 20x Franz Lambert	MC	3475090	Karussell	1974	
Fiesta Brasiliana	LP		Fontana	1975	Cover
Fiesta Brasiliana	MC		Fontana	1975	
Rote Rosen – Klassik Hits	LP		Fontana	1975	Cover
Spotlight on Hammond	LP doppel		Philips	1975	Cover
Ausgewählte Goldstücke	LP	2876014	Karussell	1975	
Ausgewählte Goldstücke	MC	3476014	Karussell	1975	
Hammond Hitparade 9	LP	9294069	Fontana	1975	Cover
Hammond Hitparade 9	MC	7172236	Fontana	1975	
King of Hammond 2	Album	6623064	Philips	1975	Cover
King of Hammond 2	LP doppel	9299832–33	Philips	1975	
King of Hammond 2	MC	7581444	Philips	1975	
Hummelflug	LP	9294073	Fontana	1975	Cover
Hummelflug	MC	7172240	Fontana	1975	
Hummelflug	MC	813883-4	Karussell	1975	
Hammond Olé	MC	3475138	Karussell	1975	
Carneval Brasil	MC	822633-4	Karussell	1975	
Hummelflug	Single		Philips	1975	Cover
Ein Weihnachtsabend mit Franz Lambert an der Wersi Orgel	LP	6830213	Philips	1975	Cover
Ein Weihnachtsabend mit Franz Lambert an der Wersi Orgel	MC	7430132	Philips	1975	
Ein Weihnachtsabend mit Franz Lambert an der Wersi Orgel	LP	9294057	Fontana	1975	
Ein Weihnachtsabend mit Franz Lambert an der Wersi Orgel	MC	7172227	Fontana	1975	
Ein Weihnachtsabend	LP		Philips	1975	(rotes Cover)
King of Hammond 3	Album	6623089	Philips	1976	Cover
King of Hammond 3	LP doppel	9286731–32	Philips	1976	
King of Hammond 3	MC	7581472	Philips	1976	
King of Hammond 4	LP doppel		Philips	1976	
Star für Millionen Franz Lambert – King of Hammond	LP	6305351	Philips	1976	Cover
Star für Millionen Franz Lambert – King of Hammond	MC	7105277	Philips	1976	
56 Holiday Hits Sunny Beach Party	Album	6626020	Philips	1976	
56 Holiday Hits Sunny Beach Party	LP doppel	6449144–45	Philips	1976	
56 Holiday Hits Sunny Beach Party	MC	7598020	Philips	1976	
Hammond Hitparade 10	LP	9294091	Fontana	1976	Cover
Hammond Hitparade 10	MC	7172259	Fontana	1976	
Franz Lambert Hammond Hitparade 56 Schlager-Favoriten	Album	6626033	Philips	1976	
Franz Lambert Hammond Hitparade 56 Schlager-Favoriten	LP doppel	6449017–18	Philips	1976	
Franz Lambert Hammond Hitparade 56 Schlager-Favoriten	MC	7598003	Philips	1976	
Motive	LP	6449055	Philips	1976	
Motive	MC	7143055	Philips	1976	
Keep on Smiling	LP	6803118	Philips	1976	
Franz Lambert spielt beliebte Evergreens	LP+Noten	1C066-32312Y	EMI	1977	Cover
Franz Lambert spielt beliebte Evergreens	Playback-MC	1C238-32313	EMI	1977	
Galaxis 2001	Single		EMI	1977	
Pop-Orgel-Hitparade 1	LP	1C056-32033	EMI	1977	Cover
Pop-Orgel-Hitparade 1	MC	1C256-32033	EMI	1977	
Pop-Orgel-Hitparade 2	LP	1C056-32438	EMI	1977	Cover
Pop-Orgel-Hitparade 2	MC	1C256-32438	EMI	1977	
Welterfolge für Millionen	LP	1C028-32073Y	EMI	1977	Cover
Welterfolge für Millionen	MC	1C228-32073Y	EMI	1977	
Pop-Orgel-Hitparade 3	LP	1C056-32837	EMI	1978	Cover
Pop-Orgel-Hitparade 3	MC	1C256-32837	EMI	1978	
Hits aktuell im Galaxis-Orgel-Sound	LP		EMI	1978	
Horch, was kommt von draußen rein	LP	1C056-32953	EMI	1978	Cover
Horch, was kommt von draußen rein	MC	1C256-32953	EMI	1978	
Pop-Orgel-Hitparade – 40 Superhits	LP		EMI	1978	Cover
Pop-Orgel-Hits	MC		EMI	1978	
Pop-Orgel-Hitparade 4	LP	1C056-45427	EMI	1979	Cover
Pop-Orgel-Hitparade 4	MC	1C256-45427	EMI	1979	
La Parranda Party	LP	1C056-45401	EMI	1979	Cover
La Parranda Party	LP	1C256-45401	EMI	1979	
Pop-Orgel-Hitparade 5	LP	Hörzu 066-45862	EMI	1979	Cover
Pop-Orgel-Hitparade 5	LP	1C066-45862	EMI	1979	
Pop-Orgel-Hitparade 5	MC	1C266-45862	EMI	1979	
Party à la carte	LP		EMI	1979	
Tanzen mit Franz Lambert	LP		EMI	1979	Cover
Pop-Orgel-Hitparade 6	LP	1C066-45976	EMI	1980	Cover
Pop-Orgel-Hitparade 6	MC	1C266-45976	EMI	1980	
Abends an der Wolga	LP	1C066-45998	EMI	1980	Cover
Abends an der Wolga	MC	1C266-45998	EMI	1980	
Supergold – Franz Lambert Galaxis-Orgel-Sound	LP doppel	1C134-45701–02	EMI	1980	Cover
Pop-Orgel-Hitparade 7	LP		EMI	1980	
Collection	LP		EMI	1980	Cover
Gold Collection	LP doppel	1C134-1467793	EMI	1980	
Gold Collection	MC	C 434-1467799	EMI	1980	
Gold Collection	CD	CDP 538 1 59864 2	EMI	1980	
Star Magazin Franz Lambert – King Of Hammond	LP	6435087	Philips	1980	
Star Magazin Franz Lambert – King Of Hammond	MC	7106087	Philips	1980	

=== 1981–1990 ===
Title	Type	Order number	Label	Year	Cover
Die Super-Party – 56 Hits zum Mitmachen	LP	6.24548	Teldec	1981	Cover
Die Super-Party – 56 Hits zum Mitmachen	MC	4.24548	Teldec	1981	
Highlights Vol. 1	LP		Teldec	1981	Cover
Top-Hits 1	LP	6.24630	Teldec	1981	Cover
Top-Hits 1	MC	4.24630	Teldec	1981	Cover
Top-Hits 2	LP	6.24947	Teldec	1981	Cover
Top-Hits 2	MC	4.24947	Teldec	1981	
Top-Hits 3	LP		Teldec	1982	
Die weiße Serie	LP	6.25225	Teldec	1982	
Die weiße Serie	MC	4.25225	Teldec	1982	
Symphonie d'Amour	LP		Teldec	1982	Cover
Symphonie d'Amour	MC		Teldec	1982	
Symphonie d'Amour	CD		Teldec	1982	
Summer Roses	Single		Teldec	1982	Cover
Toselli-Serenade	Single		Teldec	1982	Cover
Franz und die fröhlichen Fußballfans	Single		Teldec	1982	Cover
Rendevouz mit Franz Lambert	LP doppel	1C134-1467793	EMI	1983	Cover
Rendevouz mit Franz Lambert	MC	1C434-1467799	EMI	1983	
Hello America	LP	6.25576	Teldec	1983	Cover
Hello America	MC	4.25576	Teldec	1983	
Hello America	CD	8.25576	Teldec	1983	
Wonderful Organ	MC	4.25576	Teldec	1983	
Let's have a Party	LP	6.25953	Teldec	1984	Cover
Let's have a Party	MC	4.25953	Teldec	1984	
Let's have a Party	CD	8.25953	Teldec	1984	
Let's have a Party 2	LP	6.26182	Teldec	1985	Cover
Let's have a Party 2	MC	4.26182	Teldec	1985	
Let's have a Party 2	CD	8.26182	Teldec	1985	
Let's have a Party 2	LP in weiss		Teldec	1985	
Die Superhits der Volksmusik	LP	6.26328	Teldec	1986	Cover
Die Superhits der Volksmusik	MC	4.26328	Teldec	1986	
Die Superhits der Volksmusik	CD	8.26328	Teldec	1986	
Franz Lambert spielt die schönsten Volkslieder	MC	Europa 511 344.0	GeHeTon	1986	
Super Oldie-Hitparade	LP	1221	MSP	1986	Cover
Super Oldie-Hitparade	CD		MSP	1986	
Weihnachten mit Franz Lambert	LP		Dino	1986	
Weihnachten mit Franz Lambert	CD		Dino	1986	
Weihnachten mit Franz Lambert (Neuaufnahmen)	LP		Dino	1987	
Weihnachten mit Franz Lambert (Neuaufnahmen)	CD		Dino	1987	
Weihnachten mit Franz Lambert (Neuaufnahme/Ausland)	CD		Dino	1987	
Weihnachten mit Franz Lambert (Neuaufnahme/Ausland)	CD		Ariola	1987	
Golden super Hits	LP		Dino	1987	
Golden super Hits	LP		Ariola	1987	
Golden super Hits	CD		Dino	1987	
Golden super Hits	CD		Ariola	1987	
Feelings	LP		Dino	1987	
Feelings	MC		Dino	1987	
Feelings	CD	HÖRZU 1433	Dino	1987	Cover
Copacabana Beach Party	CD		EMI	1988	Cover
Copacabana Beach Party	MC		EMI	1988	
Happy Organ	MC		Teldec	1988	
Begegnungen	LP	260-05-020	Bellaphon	1989	
Begegnungen	MC	460-05-020	Bellaphon	1989	
Begegnungen	CD	290-05-020	Bellaphon	1989	Cover
Fiesta Brasiliana	CD	824364-2	Fontana	1990	Cover
Melodien d'Amour	CD		Bertelsmann	1990	
Abends an der Wolga	CD		Imperial	1990	Cover

=== 1991–2000 ===
Title	Type	Order number	Label	Year	Cover
Music Wonderland	LP		WEA	1991	
Music Wonderland	MC		WEA	1991	
Music Wonderland	CD		WEA	1991	Cover
Der lustige Orgelmann	LP	260.05.026	Bellaphon	1992	
Der lustige Orgelmann	MC	460.05.026	Bellaphon	1992	
Der lustige Orgelmann	CD	290.05.026	Bellaphon	1992	Cover
Melodien aus Gold	MC		Polygram	1992	
Melodien aus Gold	CD	513 042-2	Polygram	1992	Cover
Lambert Connection	Maxi-CD		Polydor	1992	Cover
Lambert Connection	Single		Polydor	1992	
Please don't go – Hits des Jahres '92	MC		Polydor	1992	
Please don't go – Hits des Jahres '92	CD	517310-2	Polydor	1992	Cover
Vila Vita Memories	Sonder-CD		MCL	1993	Cover
Insieme in Concerto	Sonder-CD		MCL	1993	Cover
Ammerschläger	Sonder-CD		MCL	1993	Cover
FIFA-Anthem	Sonder-CD		MCL	1994	Cover
For You	CD		Bellaphon	1994	Cover
For You	MC		Bellaphon	1994	
Träume sterben nie	CD	290.01.057	Bellaphon	1996	Cover
Träume sterben nie	MC	460.01.057	Bellaphon	1996	
El Andaluz	CD	130.01.121	Bellaphon	1996	Cover
There's a Party	CD	290.01.058	Bellaphon	1997	Cover
There's a Party	MC	460.01.058	Bellaphon	1997	
Lambertissimo	Sonder-CD		Fan-Club	1998	Cover

=== since 2001 ===
Title	Type	Order number	Label	Year	Cover
Pur	CD		Bellaphon	2001	Cover
Monotonie	Maxi-CD	9722422	Bellaphon	2002	Cover
Mit Franz Lambert um die Welt	CD	9721425	Bellaphon	2002	Cover
Wunschmelodien, die man nie vergisst	CD	352251	Tyrolis	2005	
Franz Lambert spielt die schönsten Choräle	CD	B000EBFZVO	MCL	2006	
Let's swing	CD	352401	Tyrolis	2007	
Wunschmelodien, die man nie vergisst - Vol.2	CD	-	Tyrolis	2008	

== See also ==
- FIFA Anthem
