= List of Africa Cup of Nations songs and anthems =

Africa Cup of Nations songs and anthems are songs and tunes adopted officially to be used as warm-ups to the event, to accompany the championships during the event and as a souvenir reminder of the events as well as for advertising campaigns leading for the Africa Cup of Nations, giving the singers world coverage and notoriety.

== Official songs and anthems ==
Africa Cup of Nations	Host country	Title	Language	Performer(s)	Writer(s) & producer(s)	Audios & videos	Live performance
2013	South Africa	"Sela Sela (Dance Together)"		Zahara Universe; Wes Mardico	Rod On Jr.	Music video	
2015	Equatorial Guinea	Hola Hola		Toofan, Molare, Singuila, Fally Ipupa, Eddy Kenzo, Mani Bella, Arielle T, Cano			
2017	Gabon	L'Afrique au Gabon		Patience Dabany, Serge Beynaud, J. Martins			
2019	Egypt	"Together"		Hakim; Femi Kuti; Dobet Gnahoré		Music video	
2021	Cameroon	"We stand for Africa"				Music video	
2023	Ivory Coast	"Akwaba"		Magic System; Yemi Alade; Mohamed Ramadan	Magic System; Yemi Alade; Mohamed Ramadan; Farghly Blax Produced by Dany Synthé	Music video	

== Entrance music ==
Africa Cup of Nations	Host country	Music	Notes
2013	South Africa	CAF anthem	
2015	Equatorial Guinea	CAF anthem	
2017	Gabon	CAF anthem	
2019	Egypt	CAF anthem	
2021	Cameroon	CAF anthem	
2023	Ivory Coast	CAF anthem	

== See also ==
- List of FIFA World Cup songs and anthems
- List of UEFA European Championship songs and anthems
- List of Copa América songs and anthems
- List of AFC Asian Cup songs and anthems
