= Klaus Wunderlich =

German easy-listening organist (1931–1997)

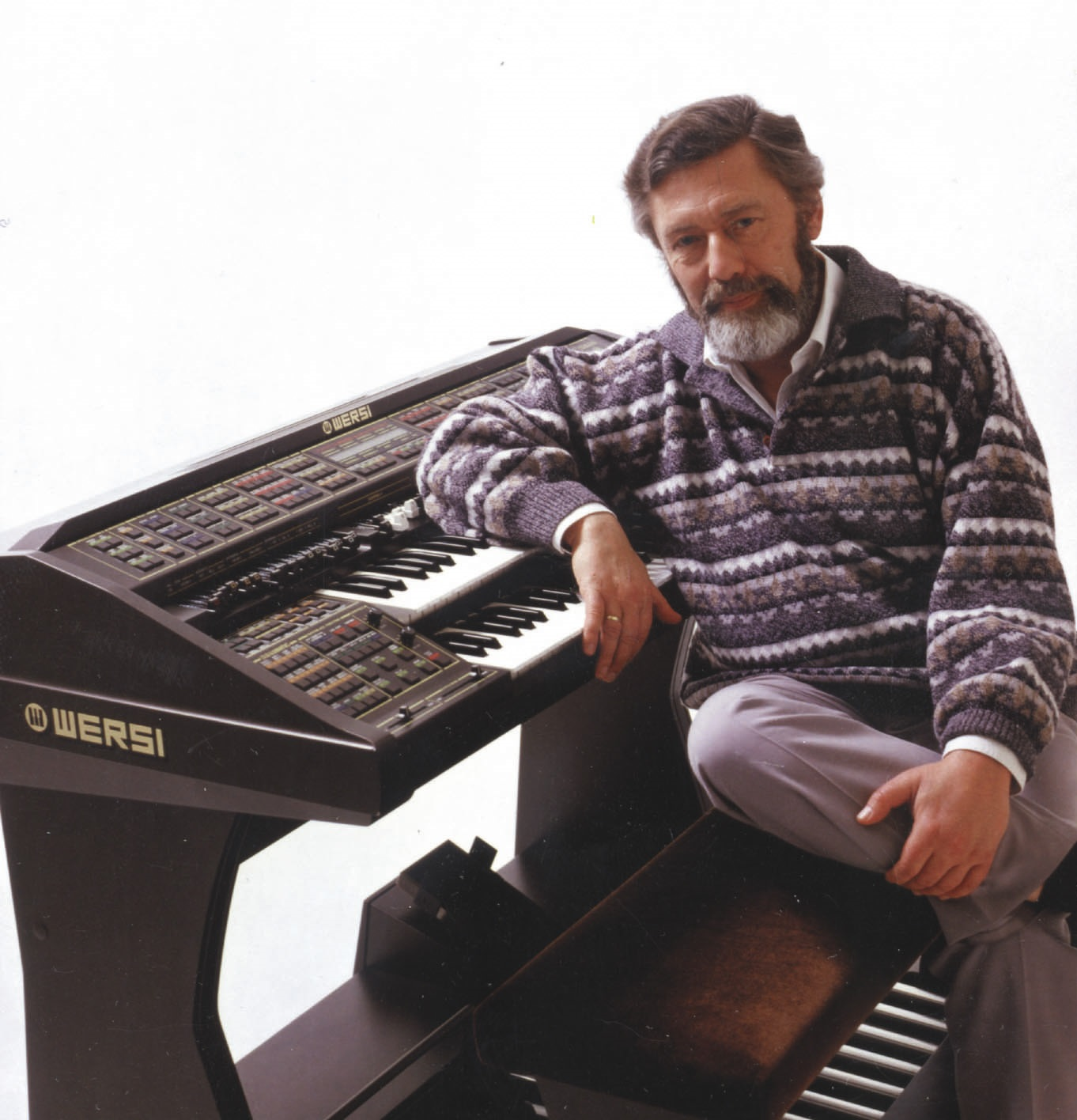
- Wunderlich, on his Spectra CD700 organ, in an undated photo

Background information
- Born: 18 June 1931; Chemnitz, Saxony, Germany
- Died: 28 October 1997 (aged 66) Engen, Baden-Württemberg, Germany
- Genres: Classical; pop; jazz; folk; easy listening
- Occupation: Musician
- Instruments: Organ; keyboards; percussion
- Years active: 1947–1997
- Website: www.klauswunderlich.de

Klaus Wunderlich (18 June 1931 – 28 October 1997) was a famous German easy-listening organist.

== Biography ==
Wunderlich was born in Chemnitz, Germany. He played the Hammond organ model C3 then mid 60s changed to model Hammond H100. Wunderlich also tried new sounds and released an album exclusively played on Hohner instruments: model Planet T, Clavinet D6 and String Melody string synthesizer (also branded as Logan String Melody). With the introduction of the first synthesizers, Wunderlich briefly used Moog synthesizer and produced three albums with the instrument. He later combined the sound of a Hammond organ model H 100 with a Lowrey Organ Model H25-3 and Wersi model W248S which was called the "New Pop Organ Sound". Wunderlich switched to Wersi organs permanently with the introduction of the Wersi Helios model in 1976, with which he created his own unique electronic sound. During the course of time, the Wersi Helios was not sufficient to keep up with current technology and trends so Wunderlich started to use Wersi Beta Dx400. The Beta was then combined with the Wersi Helios to again create a unique sound. The 1980s saw Wunderlich purchase the Wersi Pianostar electronic piano which he used for rhythm guitar effects only.

In 1988, Wunderlich decided to part company with the Wersi Helios and Beta and purchased a new organ to replace both older models, the Wersi Spectra.

Wunderlich also used a small Moog synthesizer Minimoog to replicate the sound of the Bass guitar on his recordings as well as in the latter half of his career playing the drums and percussion on his recordings.

As a musician Wunderlich was open to different music styles and played classical, operetta, Broadway musical, as well as popular music. He sold more than 20 million records globally, and received 13 golden albums as well as one golden cassette.

Wunderlich died in Engen.

Some of his work was incorporated into the Soviet cartoon, Nu Pogodi!

In 2017, a documentary film about Klaus Wunderlich was released by Duke Denver Film IVS called Wunderlich. The year after a sequel was released titled Wunderlich Stories.

Over the years his recordings have been sampled by a number of other artists. One of the most notable and unusual is the use of multiple elements, including the distinctive organ from his version of the Lynsey de Paul song, "Sugar Me", that was sampled by Guru on track 5 on his 2000 album, Guru's Jazzmatazz, Vol. 3: Streetsoul, called "Certified" performed by Bilal.

== Discography (small selection) ==
Wunderlich released more than one hundred albums, of which thirteen LP's and one music cassette was credited with gold. In the following overview the chart positions in Germany, the United Kingdom and the Netherlands are given:

Year	Title	Country	Peak	Weeks
1965	Hammond-Feuerwerk	Germany	24	4
1966	Barmusik - 28 Melodien, die man nie vergißt	Germany	28	4
1969	Hammond Pops III	Germany	10	12
1971	Hammond Pops 6	Germany	41	12
1975	The Hit World Of Klaus Wunderlich	United Kingdom	27	8
1976	Speelt voor u 28 wereldbekende melodieën	Netherlands	2	12
1978	The Unique Klaus Wunderlich Sound	United Kingdom	28	4
1979	The Fantastic Sound Of Klaus Wunderlich	Netherlands	2	17
1979	The Fantastic Sound Of Klaus Wunderlich	United Kingdom	43	5
1981	The Fantastic Sound Of Klaus Wunderlich vol. II	Netherlands	13	24
1984	On The Sunny Side Of The Street	United Kingdom	81	2
