= Peter Calandra =

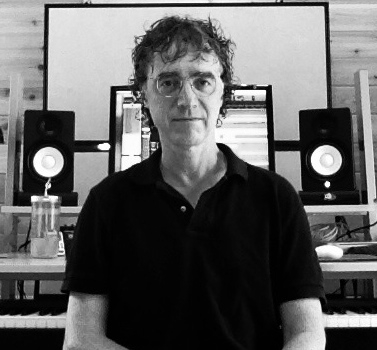

Background information
- Born: Brooklyn, New York
- Origin: Northport, New York
- Occupations: composer, musician, conductor
- Instruments: piano, guitar
- Website: petecalandramusic.com

Peter Calandra is a New York City-based composer and pianist. He is known for his work composing music for television and film as well as conducting and playing piano in Broadway and Off Broadway productions. The former includes the FIFA Men's and FIFA Women's World Cup themes for FOX Sports and, starting 2015, the themes for the Special Olympics World Games and Invictus Games for ESPN, in film, 13th Child (2002), Unknown Soldier (2004), Jellysmoke (2005), and BearCity 2: The Proposal (2012). He has also composed the music for the Kennedy Center Honors.

On Broadway, Calandra has played keyboard for Miss Saigon, Les Misérables, and The Phantom of the Opera. He performed in and served as conductor and musical director for the original New York City production of Little Shop of Horrors. In his career as a pianist, he has performed with musical artists and orchestras including Aretha Franklin, The New York Pops, jazz singer Dee Dee Bridgewater, Don Cherry, and actress/singer Annie Golden.

His own albums are Sunrise Over New York (2004), Late Night Christmas (2009), Satya (2011, with Bill Buchen & Stomu Takeishi), Ashokan Memories (2013), Inner Circle (2014), First Light (2015), The Road Home (2017), Piano Improvisations, Vol. 1, Carpe Noctem, Little Paws On The Walls (all 2018), Piano Improvisations, Vol. 2 (2019) and Ambient Tuesdays (2021). Calandra has a master's degree in Music Composition from Queens College, City University of New York and teaches Audio/MIDI Sequencing, Film Scoring and Music Composition at its Aaron Copland School of Music at both the graduate and undergraduate levels.

== Career ==
=== Theatre ===
Calandra has played keyboard as part of a pit orchestra for a number of musicals. Some he is known for include Miss Saigon, Les Misérables, and The Phantom of the Opera. He performed in and also served as conductor and musical director for the original New York City production of Little Shop of Horrors at the Orpheum Theater.

=== Films ===
Calandra has scored over 90 feature and short films and documentaries. For film scores and compositions, he uses a variety of instrumentation and styles. He has stated that most of the film music he writes "has a combination of orchestral, choral, piano, ethnic and electronic elements..." but he often alters his approach for certain films. As an example, for his score for Pat XO, an ESPN documentary on college basketball coach Pat Summitt, Calandra's score is based on acoustic guitars and live percussion. Calandra stated that for this score, he created a "roots oriented," "small ensemble" sound to match the down-to-earth qualities of the film.

One of Calandra's most well-known works is his score for the 2004 film Unknown Soldier by director Ferenc Tóth. For this score, which primarily features instrumental jazz, Calandra performed with saxophonist Dale Kleps, trumpeter Bud Burridge, bassist Kermit Driscoll, and drummer Howard Joines. Dr. Ana Isabel Ordonez of JazzReview praised the recording, stating that "Unknown Soldier's jazz score highlights bravery and the human social fracture in our society."

In 2011, Calandra composed music for the film Rise. Commissioned by U.S. Figure Skating, the film, a Fathom event that played in select theaters, starred Patricia Clarkson and Dakota Fanning, with appearances by American skaters like Dorothy Fleming, Michelle Kwan, and Scott Hamilton. It commemorated members of the U.S. figure skating team killed in the 1961 crash of Sabena Flight 548. Calandra composed an orchestral score as well as an original song which plays during the opening title sequence of the film.

=== Television ===
Calandra's television composition credits include projects for the National Geographic Society, Sesame Workshop, ABC-Touchstone, NBC, Fox Sports, A&E, and Discovery Communications. A few of his songs from his 2003 soundtrack album Sunrise Over New York have also been used on The Weather Channel's Local on the 8s segments in early 2004. He also written a large amount of themes for television broadcast, theme packages for Fox Sports, ESPN, Bravo, NBC-Comcast SportsNet, MSG, SportsNet New York, and the Big Ten Network. Most recently this has included the FIFA Men's and Women's World Cup themes for FOX Sports and the themes for the Special Olympics World Games and Invictus Games for ESPN starting in 2015.

He composed the music for the Kennedy Center Honors in 2015, 2016, 2017, and 2019 which airs every year on CBS. In 2020, Calandra composed three nights of the music for the 2020 Democratic National Convention. In 2024 he composed music for 3 biopics about Vice President Kamala Harris that were shown during the 2024 Democratic National Convention.

=== Work for individual artists and musical groups ===
In his career as a pianist, Calandra has performed with musical artists and orchestras including The New York Pops, jazz singer Dee Dee Bridgewater, trumpeter Don Cherry, soul singer Aretha Franklin, Allen Ginsberg, and actress/singer Annie Golden. He also spent many years as a keyboard player in New York City-based artist and musician Larry Rivers' Climax Band.

== Selected discography ==
Year	Album details
2004	Sunrise Over New York: Label: PCM
2006	Unknown Soldier Soundtrack: Label: MovieScore Media
2008	Jellysmoke Soundtrack: Label: MovieScore Media
2009	Late Night Christmas: Label: PCM
2011	Satya: with Bill Buchen & Stomu Takeishi; Label: PCM
2013	Ashokan Memories: Label: PCM
2014	Inner Circle: Label: PCM
2015	First Light: Label: PCM
2017	The Road Home: Label: PCM
2018	Piano Improvisations, Vol.1: Label: PCM
2018	Carpe Noctem: Label: PCM
2018	Little Paws On The Walls: Label: PCM
2019	Piano Improvisations, Vol.2: Label: PCM
2021	Ambient Tuesdays: Label: PCM
2023	The Blue Light: Label: PCM
2024	Spirit: Label: PCM
2025	Night Mist: Label: PCM
2026	The Stillness Between: Label: PCM

== Selected filmography ==
Year	Film details
2002	13th Child: Composed score
2004	Unknown Soldier: Composed score
2005	Jellysmoke: Composed score
2010	Unmatched: Composed score
2011	Rise: Composed score and original song
2012	BearCity 2: The Proposal: Composed score
2013	Pat XO: Composed score
2014	41 on 41: Composed score
2015	Coach Bernie: Composed score
2017	Maria Sharapova: The Point: Composed score
2021	SEC Storied Once Upon A Comeback: Composed score
2021	The 96 Effect: Composed score
2022	Catch 98: Composed score
2026	First In Class: Composed score

== Awards ==
- 2004 Los Angeles Film Festival, for Unknown Soldier
- 2004 Philadelphia Film Festival, for Unknown Soldier
- 2005 Los Angeles Film Festival, for Jellysmoke
- 2016 New York Festivals: "Finalist Award Winner, Best Music/Lyrics" for "ESPN Special Olympics World Games Theme"
- 2016 One World Music: "Best Piano With Instrumentation" for "First Light"
- 2017 One World Music: "Best Contemporary Instrumental" for "The Road Home"
- 2018 Global Music Awards: "Silver Medal Winner-Outstanding Achievement" for the composition "Agnus Dei"
- 2023 Global Music Awards: "Silver Medal Winner-Outstanding Achievement" for album "The Blue Light"
- 2023 Hollywood Independent Music Awards Nominee: "Jazz-Smooth/Cool" for "Neptune Beach-Pete Calandra and Straight Up"
- 2023 Clouzine Magazine: "Best Jazz Funk" for "Bleecker Street-Pete Calandra and Straight Up"
- 2023 Global Music Awards: "Bronze Medal Winner-Jazz Composer" for "Neon Beach-Pete Calandra and Straight Up"
- 2024 Hollywood Independent Music Awards Nominee: "Jazz-Smooth/Cool" for "Mixed Emotions-Pete Calandra and Straight Up"
- 2025 Clouzine Magazine: "Best Brazilian Song" for "September In Rio-Pete Calandra and Straight Up"
- 2025 Global Music Awards: "Silver Medal Winner-Outstanding Achievement" for album "Neptune Beach-Pete Calandra and Straight Up"
- 2025 Hollywood Independent Music Awards Nominee: "Jazz-Smooth/Cool" for "Shades Of Life-Pete Calandra and Straight Up"
- 2026 European Independent Music Awards Winner: "Best New Age/Neo Classical Album and Composer" for "The Stillness Between"
