= FIFA Anthem =

Music played at football events

- Corporate anthem of FIFA
- Music: Franz Lambert with arrangement by Rob May and Simon Hill, 1994 (re-arranged by Gota Yashiki in 2004)
- Adopted: 1994 (re-arranged in 2004) until 2018 (original)

Audio sample
- "FIFA Anthem" (post-2004 arrangement, snippet): file; help

The "FIFA Anthem" or "FIFA Hymn" is an instrumental song played at the beginning of FIFA-sponsored events, such as futsal and association football matches and tournaments (like international friendlies, the FIFA World Cup or any other association football competitions), usually as the participants enter the playing area. Occasionally, there have been instances where a different song has been used in its place, such as Vangelis' "Anthem" used at the 2002 FIFA World Cup.

Since the 2018 FIFA World Cup and 2019 FIFA Women's World Cup, a new anthem, "Living Football" is used as the entrance music when both teams' national flags and FIFA flags enter the ground.

== History ==
=== Early years (1994–2004) ===
It was first played at the 1994 World Cup, composed by Franz Lambert and is instrumental with no lyrics. Rob May and Simon Hill arranged it.

=== Rearranged version (2004–2018) ===
In 2004, the song was rearranged and re-recorded with improved acoustics by Gota Yashiki and it is this version that is currently used by FIFA before the start of matches. It was used in the 2010 and 2014 FIFA World Cups, though the 1994 version was used at the final of the 2006 World Cup.

=== New anthem: Living Football (2018–present) ===
"Living Football"
- Corporate anthem of FIFA
- Music: Hans Zimmer and Lorne Balfe, 2018
- Adopted: 2018

In 2018, FIFA commissioned Hans Zimmer and Lorne Balfe to compose a new theme to be used at 2018 FIFA World Cup in Russia. The theme, named "Living Football" to coincide with FIFA's new slogan, was played before every World Cup match, as the volunteers began to unveil the giant 2018 FIFA World Cup logo (replaced by a picture of the FIFA World Cup Trophy in the final) at the pitch, along with the flags of the two nations in every match. The "FIFA Anthem" itself – which always played when the players walked out onto the stadium pitch, was replaced by "Seven Nation Army" of The White Stripes for that tournament. The trend has continued at all subsequent FIFA-sanctioned tournaments, including the FIFA U-20 Women's World Cup, the FIFA Club World Cup, FIFA U-20 World Cup, and the FIFA Women's World Cup.

The "Living Football" theme was used again at the 2018 FIFA Club World Cup, which was held in the United Arab Emirates and also at the 2019 FIFA U-20 World Cup in Poland and the 2019 FIFA Women's World Cup in France.

== See also ==
- AFC Anthem
- Zadok the Priest, the UEFA anthem
- Anthems of international organizations
