= John Foxx discography =

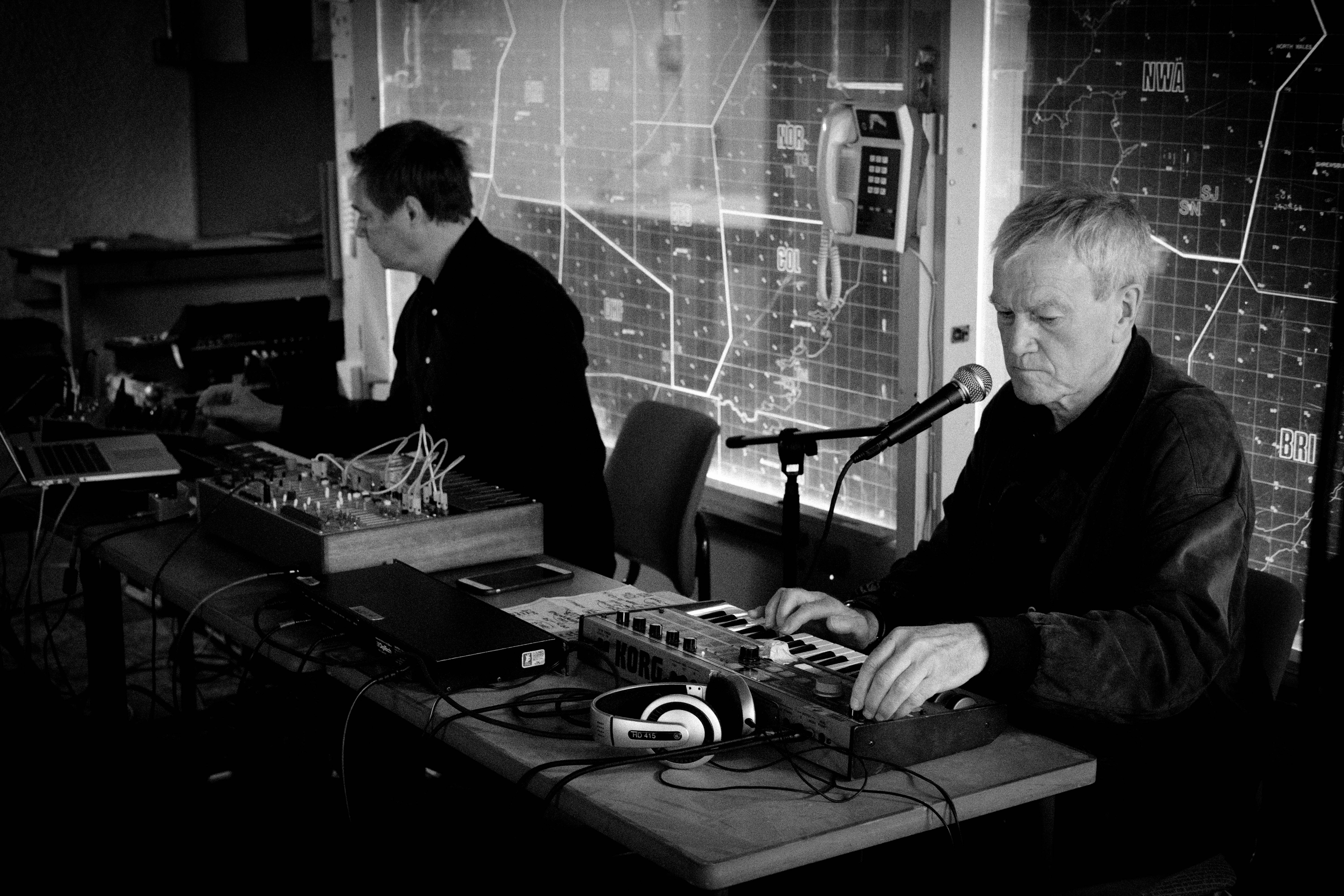
- Foxx (right) with Benge before a concert in 2016.
- Studio albums: 0
- EPs: 3
- Live albums: 3
- Compilation albums: 5
- Singles: 10
- B-sides: 15
- Video albums: 2

This is a complete discography of the British recording artist John Foxx.

== Albums ==
=== Studio albums ===
==== Ultravox! ====
- 1977 - Ultravox!
- 1977 - Ha! Ha! Ha!
- 1978 - Systems of Romance

==== As John Foxx ====
- 1980 - Metamatic (# 18 UK), (# 98 AUS)
- 1981 - The Garden (# 24 UK)
- 1983 - The Golden Section (# 27 UK)
- 1985 - In Mysterious Ways (# 85 UK)
- 1997 - Cathedral Oceans
- 2003 - Cathedral Oceans I + Cathedral Oceans II (02/06/2003)
- 2005 - Cathedral Oceans III (08/08/2005)
- 2006 - Tiny Colour Movies
- 2006 - The Hidden Man (2CD interview set, a reading from The Quiet Man and three new songs.) (21/07/2006)
- 2007 - Metal Beat (2CD interview set between Steve Malins and John Foxx, discussing the making of Metamatic.) (29/09/2007)
- 2009 - My Lost City (25/02/2009)
- 2009 - The Quiet Man (Extracts from the ongoing Quiet Man book read by Justin Barton, together with a new piano score by John Foxx.) (27/07/2009)
- 2010 - D.N.A. (02/06/2010)
- 2014 - B-Movie (Ballardian Video Neuronica) (14/04/2014)
- 2015 - London Overgrown (30/03/2015)
- 2016 - Complete Cathedral Oceans 12" vinyl LP Box Set (02/09/2016) - “Cathedral Oceans I” (1997), “Cathedral Oceans II” (2003) and “Cathedral Oceans III” (2005) on five LPs.
- 2022 - The Marvellous Notebook (01/07/2022)
- 2023 - Avenham (24/02/2023)
- 2023 - The Arcades Project (31/03/2023)
- 2025 - Wherever You Are (28/03/2025)

==== As John Foxx and Louis Gordon ====
- 1997 - Shifting City
- 1997 - Subterranean Omnidelic Exotour EP - recorded live in the studio
- 1998 - Subterranean Omnidelic Exotour
- 2001 - The Pleasures of Electricity
- 2003 - Crash and Burn
- 2003 - The Drive EP
- 2003 - The Omnidelic Exotour - Subterranean Omnidelic Exotour re-release with The Golden Section Tour CD
- 2006 - Live From A Room (As Big As A City) - recorded live in the studio
- 2006 - From Trash
- 2006 - Sideways - with second bonus disc featuring an interview with John Foxx
- 2008 - Sideways - re-issue with second disc featuring live tracks, remixes and extended versions
- 2008 - Impossible
- 2009 - Shifting City - 2 disc remaster
- 2009 - The Pleasures of Electricity - 2 disc remaster
- 2010 - Crash and Burn - re-issue with bonus disc

Crash And Burn and From Trash were also released as part of the John Foxx boxset Cinemascope (2008)

==== As John Foxx and the Maths ====
- 2011 - Interplay
- 2011 - The Shape of Things
- 2012 - Evidence
- 2012 - Rhapsody - recorded live in the studio, shortly after 2011's Interplay tour.
- 2014 - The Good Shadow - digital release only featuring eight tracks which originally appeared on the second disc of The Shape Of Things
- 2017 - The Machine
- 2020 - Howl (# 80 UK)

=== Live albums ===
==== As John Foxx ====
- 2003 - The Golden Section Tour - released together with The Omnidelic Exotour with Louis Gordon
- 2008 - A New Kind of Man - live performances of all Metamatic and related tracks.
- 2009 - In the Glow - recorded on The Golden Section tour, 1983.

==== As John Foxx and Louis Gordon ====
- 2007 - Retro Future - recorded on the Exotour, on 10 January 1998 at Shrewsbury Music Hall
- 2008 - Neuro Video - recorded at The Luminaire in London, on 24 November 2007.

=== Compilation albums ===
==== With Ultravox ====
- 1980 - Three Into One
- 1993 - Slow Motion
- 1999 - The Island Years (as Ultravox!)
- 2016 - Ultravox!: The Island Years 4-CD boxset

==== As John Foxx ====
- 1992 - Assembly
- 2001 - Modern Art – The Best of John Foxx
- 2008 - Glimmer - Best of John Foxx
- 2008 - Cinemascope - boxset including Crash and Burn (2003), Cathedral Oceans III (2005), Tiny Colour Movies (2006), From Trash (2006), Electrofear (as Nation 12) (2005) and Cathedral Oceans DVD (featuring the music of Cathedral Oceans III).
- 2010 - The Complete Cathedral Oceans boxset including Cathedrals Oceans I, II & III on CD and III on DVD
- 2010 - Metatronic
- 2013 - Metadelic
- 2014 - The Virgin Years 1980-1985 - CD boxset including Metamatic (1980), The Garden (1981), The Golden Section (1983), In Mysterious Ways (1985), Fusion/Fission (compilation of bonus tracks).
- 2015 - 20th Century: The Noise
- 2016 - Burning Car EP (vinyl only)
- 2016 - 21st Century. A Man, A Woman and A City
- 2025 - No-One Driving

=== Other collaborations ===
- 2003 - Translucence/Drift Music - John Foxx + Harold Budd
- 2005 - Electrofear - Nation 12
- 2005 - Dualizm Jori Hulkkonen feat. John Foxx on Dislocated
- 2005 - Dislocated (EP) - Jori Hulkkonen feat. John Foxx
- 2008 - Never been Here Before (EP) - Jori Hulkkonen feat. John Foxx
- 2009 - A Secret Life - D'Agostino/Foxx/Jansen - with Steve D'Agostino and Steven Jansen
- 2009 - Mirrorball - John Foxx and Robin Guthrie
- 2010 - 4'33'' - Cage Against The Machine
- 2012 - Nighthawks - John Foxx and Harold Budd featuring Ruben Garcia - issued with re-release of Translucence and Drift Music
- 2013 - European Splendour EP - John Foxx + Jori Hulkkonen (with a remix by David Lynch on the Deluxe version)
- 2013 - Empty Avenues EP - John Foxx and The Belbury Circle (with a remix by Pye Corner Audio)
- 2014 - Evidence Of Time Travel - John Foxx and Steve D’Agostino (Limited Edition LP & CD, released October 2014)
- 2015 - Codex album - as Ghost Harmonic (with Benge and Diana Yukawa) (announced for May 2015 release)
- 2025 - A Million Times / A Million Times (instrumental) with Ade Fenton (digital single)

== Singles and EPs ==
=== Tiger Lily ===
"Monkey Jive"/"Ain’t Misbehavin’" 7" (1975)

=== Ultravox! ===
"Dangerous Rhythm" (1977)
"Young Savage" (1977)
"ROckWrok" (1977)
"Quirks" (1977)
"Frozen Ones" (1977)
"Slow Motion" (1978) - re-issued 1981 (# 33 UK)
"Quiet Men" (1978)

=== As John Foxx ===
- "Underpass" (1980) (# 31 UK)
- "No-One Driving" (1980) (# 32 UK)
- "Burning Car" (1980) (# 35 UK)
- "My Face" (1980) - flexi-disc that came with Smash Hits vol. 2, no. 20
- "Miles Away" (1980) (# 51 UK)
- "Europe After the Rain" (1981) (# 40 UK)
- "Dancing Like a Gun" (1981)
- "Endlessly" (1982) - first version
- "Endlessly" (1983) (# 66 UK) - new version
- "Your Dress" (1983) (# 61 UK)
- "Like a Miracle" (1983)
- "Stars On Fire" (1985) (# 89 UK)
- "Enter the Angel" (1985)

=== As John Foxx and the Maths ===
2009 - Destination/September Town (digital download only)

=== Other collaborations ===
- 1985 - Heaven - Anne Clark - 7" and 12" versions co-written and produced by John Foxx
- 2008 - Dislocated (EP) - Jori Hulkkonen feat. John Foxx
- 2008 - Never been Here Before (EP) - Jori Hulkkonen feat. John Foxx
- 2012 - Changelings (John Foxx and the Maths remix) by Gazelle Twin on the album The Entire City Remixed
- 2013 - Dresden (John Foxx and the Maths remix) by OMD from the "Dresden" single EP, released May 2013
- 2013 - Blood Diamonds (John Foxx & The Maths Remix) by Simple Minds, digital release December 2013
