= Modern Art – The Best of John Foxx =

Modern Art - the Best of John Foxx

Compilation album by John Foxx
- Released: 4 June 2001
- Genres: New wave, electronic, synthpop
- Length: 73:04
- Labels: Music Club; MCCD 454
- Producer: John Foxx,

John Foxx chronology
In Mysterious Ways (1985)	Modern Art - the Best of John Foxx (2001)	Cathedral Oceans (1997)

Modern Art - the Best of John Foxx is the title of an 18-track compilation album by British recording artist John Foxx, released on 4 June 2001.

Its issue coincided with the publication of a new album with Louis Gordon "The Pleasures of Electricity" and the re-issue of Foxx's first four solo albums on CD, Metamatic, The Garden, The Golden Section and In Mysterious Ways, all published by Edsel Records. Unlike the previous compilation, Assembly, "Modern Art" is a chronological and fairly straightforward compendium of Foxx's 1980s singles (with the exception of "20th Century" which was a B side) plus a selection of tracks covering musical output since returning to the music scene in 1997. Although the content of the album features output from all of Foxx's musical output to date, including the Cathedral Oceans ambient project, the cover art uses photographs of Foxx from his relatively short Metamatic era.

== Track listing ==
1. Underpass
2. No-One Driving
3. Burning Car
4. 20th Century
5. Miles Away
6. Europe After The Rain
7. Dancing Like A Gun
8. Endlessly
9. Your Dress
10. Like A Miracle
11. Stars On Fire
12. Enter The Angel
13. Sunset Rising
14. The Noise
15. Nightlife
16. Shifting City
17. My Face
18. He's A Liquid

Tracks 1–12: all single edits or remixes. This version of "Endlessly" is the original 1982 single version, not the 1983 version featured on the previous Assembly compilation.

"Nightlife" is stated as being from The Pleasures of Electricity, even though said album had yet to be published.

This version of "Shifting City" is the live in the studio version as appears on the "Subterranean Omnidelic Exotour" album.

The final two tracks are previously rare 'bonus' tracks, namely My Face, released on 2 October 1980 as a flexi-disc only with Smash Hits magazine, and an alternative version of the Metamatic track "He's A Liquid", the B-side to the Underpass promotional-only 12-inch single.
