= Assembly (John Foxx album) =

Compilation album by John Foxx
- Released: 29 June 1992
- Genres: New wave, electronic, synthpop
- Length: 70:00
- Labels: Virgin; CDVM 9002
- Producer: John Foxx

John Foxx chronology
In Mysterious Ways (1985)	Assembly (1992)	Cathedral Oceans (1997)

Assembly is the title of an 18-track compilation album by British recording artist John Foxx released on 29 June 1992. It contains tracks from the artist's first four albums – Metamatic, The Garden, The Golden Section and In Mysterious Ways as well as tracks which had not been previously issued in an album format. The album was remastered for CD by Foxx himself, and although was the first time many of his solo tracks had appeared on CD there were no new tracks and none of the tracks remain exclusive to this release.

The sleeve of "Assembly" features one of Foxx's Cathedral Oceans images, although in 1992, none of the music from that project had yet been made available. The CD booklet contains sleeve notes written by John Foxx himself where he describes each phase of his work over the 1980s.

== Track listing ==
No.	Title	Length
1.	"A New Kind of Man"
2.	"Underpass"
3.	"Burning Car"
4.	"This City"
5.	"Twilight's Last Gleaming"
6.	"Ghosts On Water"
7.	"This Jungle"
8.	"Endlessly"
9.	"Someone"
10.	"Sitting at the Edge of the World"
11.	"In Mysterious Ways"
12.	"Morning Glory"
13.	"Europe After the Rain"
14.	"Systems of Romance"
15.	"Walk Away"
16.	"When I was a Man and You Were a Woman"
17.	"Pater Noster"
18.	"The Garden"

Tracks 1–3 from Metamatic

Track 4 - B-side of "No-One Driving" single

Tracks 5, 6, 8–10 from The Golden Section

Track 7 - B-side of "Europe After the Rain" single

Tracks 11, 12 from In Mysterious Ways

Tracks 13 - 18 from The Garden

The issue is part of the "VU Virgin Universal" series and is the first John Foxx compilation. The next compilation was Modern Art – The Best of John Foxx, issued in 2001.
