= Shifting City =

Studio album by John Foxx & Louis Gordon
- Released: 24 March 1997
- Recorded: MetaMatic Studio; CRoms studio 1995
- Genre: Electronic
- Length: 56:16
- Label: Metamatic Records
- Producer: Louis Gordon & John Foxx

John Foxx chronology
Cathedral Oceans (1997)	Shifting City (1997)	The Pleasures of Electricity (2001)

Louis Gordon chronology
Shifting City (1997)	The Pleasures of Electricity (2001)

Professional ratings
Review scores
Source	Rating
Allmusic	3/5 stars

Shifting City is an album by John Foxx and Louis Gordon, released simultaneously with Foxx's ambient album Cathedral Oceans on 24 March 1997, Shifting City was Foxx's first album release since In Mysterious Ways (1985).

Stylistically Shifting City marked a return to the electronic sound of Foxx's 1980 solo album Metamatic, although it also shows an influence of 1960s The Beatles-style psychedelia, a style which Foxx had already experimented with on 1983's The Golden Section.

A 2CD special edition was released on 19 October 2009, including three previously unreleased bonus tracks. Disc Two of this special re-issue contains the previously released “The Omnidelic Exotour” material, recorded live by Foxx and Gordon at A Certain Ratio's Warehouse in Ancoats, Manchester and at Metamatic Studio in 1997.

== Track listing ==
=== 1997 original release ===
1. "The Noise" (Foxx) – 4:17
2. "Crash" (Foxx, Gordon) – 5:24
3. "Here We Go" (Foxx, Gordon) – 7:03
4. "Shadow Man" (Foxx) – 7:26
5. "Through My Sleeping" (Foxx) – 5:03
6. "Forgotten Years" (Foxx, Gordon) – 5:43
7. "Everyone" (Foxx, Gordon) – 5:48
8. "Shifting City" (Foxx) – 3:36
9. "Concrete, Bulletproof, Invisible" (Foxx, Gordon, Leven) – 5:42
10. "An Ocean We Can Breathe" (Foxx, Gordon) – 6:23
- "Through My Sleeping" (originally titled "Leaving") and "Concrete, Bulletproof, Invisible" are re-recordings of material originally recorded by Foxx with Nation 12. On Nation 12's Electrofear album the tracks are credited to John Foxx, Shem McAuley, Kurt Rodgers and Simon Rodgers.

=== 2009 Special edition ===
CD1

1. "The Noise"
2. "Crash"
3. "Here We Go"
4. "Shadow Man"
5. "Through My Sleeping"
6. "Forgotten Years"
7. "Everyone"
8. "Shifting City"
9. "Concrete, Bulletproof, Invisible"
10. "An Ocean We Can Breathe"
11. "Shadow Man" (Early Version - Mono mix)
12. "Quiet Men" (Subterranean Omnidelic Exotour)
13. "Just for a Moment" (Subterranean Omnidelic Exotour)

CD2

1. "20th Century" (Omnidelic Exotour)
2. "Burning Car" (Omnidelic Exotour)
3. "Overpass" (Omnidelic Exotour)
4. "This City" (Omnidelic Exotour)
5. "Hiroshima Mon Amour" (Omnidelic Exotour)
6. "Just for a Moment" (Omnidelic Exotour)
7. "Quiet Men" (Omnidelic Exotour)
8. "Dislocation" (Omnidelic Exotour)
9. "An Ocean We Can Breathe" (Omnidelic Exotour)
10. "Through My Sleeping" (Omnidelic Exotour)
11. "The Noise" (Omnidelic Exotour)
12. "Shifting City" (Omnidelic Exotour)
13. "Endlessly" (Omnidelic Exotour)

== Personnel ==
- John Foxx: vocals, synthesisers, rhythm machines
- Louis Gordon: synthesisers, rhythm machines, backing vocals
