= Europe After the Rain =

"Europe After The Rain"

Single by John Foxx
- Released: 21 August 1981
- Recorded: The Garden Studios, London, 1980
- Genre: New wave, electronic
- Length: 3:37
- Label: Virgin/Metal Beat; VS 393
- Songwriter: John Foxx
- Producer: John Foxx

John Foxx singles chronology
"Miles Away" (1980)	"Europe After The Rain" (1981)	"Dancing Like a Gun" (1981)

"Europe After The Rain" is a song by John Foxx, released as a single on 21 August 1981, and included on The Garden album released the following month.

The song signalled a departure from Foxx's previous solo work which had focused on a sparse electronic sound whereas Europe After The Rain features a warmer sound, using acoustic and electric guitars, acoustic piano and live drums to produce the music. The bass and string sounds were however produced by a synthesiser. Foxx has several times stated that this change in musical direction was caused by a visit to Italy after the Metamatic period, where he worked with director Michaelangelo Antonioni for the soundtrack of his film Identification of a Woman.

Although the single only reached no. 40 in the UK Singles Chart, Foxx performed the song on UK music show Top of the Pops where Foxx's new more romantic style was presented in the clothes and setting to accompany the performance in stark contrast to that of "Underpass" on the same show some eighteen months previously. For this performance Foxx was seen playing acoustic guitar, flanked by three other musicians on piano and keyboards. These musicians were Eddie and Sunshine and Duncan Bridgeman of the band Shake Shake, who had collaborated with Foxx in writing B-side "A Long Time" in 1980.

The Top of the Pops footage was issued officially for the first time in 2013, on the DVD of the artist's Metadelic collection. No video was made for the single.

== Track listing ==
7"

- "Europe After The Rain" (3:37)
- "This Jungle" (4:40)

12"

- "Europe After The Rain" (3:59)
- "This Jungle" (4:19)
- "You Were There" (4:18)

Produced by John Foxx, and engineered by Gareth Jones

=== "This Jungle" ===
The B-side, "This Jungle", remained unique to this release until its inclusion in the Assembly compilation album (1992). The title is evocative of a 1980 John Foxx B-side "This City". The track appeared later on the 2001 and 2008 re-issues of The Garden (but not on the 1993 edition). "You Were There" would later appear in the same version on The Garden LP the same year, and appears on all subsequent re-releases..

Artwork for the 12" version is identical to the 7" except for the wording of the additional track.

"Europe After The Rain" is also the title of a painting by Max Ernst, who would have been known to Foxx as a former art-student and graphic artist. There is however no reference to the painting or to the artist in the song's lyrics or in the single cover art, designed by Foxx.

== Appeared on ==
"Europe After The Rain" also appears on the following John Foxx issues:

- The Garden (original LP, 1981; subsequent CD re-issues 1993, 2001, 2008)
- Assembly (compilation album, 1992)
- Modern Art (compilation album, 2001)
- Glimmer (compilation album, 2008)
- Metadelic (compilation album, 2008)
- Neuro Video (live album, 2008; live recording of performance by John Foxx and Louis Gordon at The Luminaire in London, on the 24 November 2007.

It also featured on:

- Modern Dance - (a new-wave compilation album, 1981)

== Cover versions ==
In 1994 Italian band State released a dance version.

The song was covered in 2012 by Spanish singer and recording artist Miqui Puig, who considered the song as having special significance at this time of the "cyclical decline of Europe". A video recording was published of the singer performing the song with a backing band in a disused button factory, which has been located in the Poble Nou district of Barcelona since 1928. The performance of "Europe After The Rain" therefore "becomes a tribute to the last holdouts of the labor sector of the city".
