= Metatronic =

Compilation album by John Foxx
- Released: 3 May 2010
- Genre: Electronic, new wave, synthpop, ambient
- Length: 72:00
- Label: Edsel Records; EDSX3009
- Producer: John Foxx,

John Foxx chronology
In the Glow (2009)	Metatronic (2010)	D.N.A. (2010)

Metatronic is a retrospective compilation of recorded audio and visual material by British musician and recording artist John Foxx. It was released on 3 May 2010 by Edsel Records to mark the 30th anniversary of Foxx's debut solo album Metamatic and the start of his solo career. The idea for the compilation was first mentioned in the Ultravox fanzine Extreme Voice back in 1999.

The three disc set, comprising two CDs and one DVD, highlights on the electronic side of Foxx's recorded work and includes promo videos for 'Underpass', 'No-One Driving' and 'He's A Liquid' on DVD for the first time, along with rare performances of 'The Noise' and 'Shifting City' performed by Foxx and Louis Gordon and filmed by VH1.

The extended version of Underpass and the "early version" of Burning Car remain exclusive to this release, as do the tracks on CD2 recorded live in Sydney.

== Track listing ==
=== CD 1 ===
1. "Underpass" (Extended Version)
2. "This City"
3. "No-One Driving"
4. "Burning Car"
5. "The Noise"
6. "Everyone"
7. "When It Rains"
8. "Automobile"
9. "Broken Furniture" (Single Version)
10. "Drive" (Single Version)
11. "Once in a While"
12. "From Trash"
13. "Never Let Me Go"
14. "Smokescreen"
15. "Cinemascope"
16. "Phone Tap"
17. "Smoke"

=== CD 2 (Live in Sydney, 2008) ===
1. "Crash & Burn"
2. "Uptown / Downtown"
3. "The Man Who Dies Every Day"
4. "Hiroshima Mon Amour"
5. "Underpass"
6. "From Trash"
7. "Shadow Man"
8. "My Sex"

=== CD 2 Bonus Tracks ===
1. "Burning Car" (Early Version)
2. "Underpass" (Mark Reeder's Sinister Subway Mix)
3. "Dislocated" (Jussi Pekka's Pointed On a Map Remix)
4. "20th Century" (Dubterror Vs. Karborn Mix)

=== DVD ===
1. "Underpass" (B&W)
2. "He's a Liquid"
3. "No-One Driving"
4. "Smokescreen"
5. "Underpass" (Mark Reeder's Sinister Subway Mix)
6. "The Noise" (Live)
7. "Shifting City" (Live)
