= Miles Away (John Foxx song) =

Single by John Foxx
- Released: 31 October 1980
- Recorded: 1980
- Studio: The Music Works, London; Pathway, London
- Genre: New wave, electronic
- Length: 3:16
- Label: Virgin; VS 382
- Songwriter: John Foxx
- Producer: John Foxx

John Foxx singles chronology
"My Face" (1980)	"Miles Away" (1980)	"Europe After The Rain" (1981)

"Miles Away" is a song by John Foxx, released as a single on 31 October 1980. It was his fourth solo single, following "Burning Car" in July that year. The track was not included on any original album, falling roughly midway between the release of Foxx's debut LP Metamatic in January 1980 and his second album The Garden in September 1981.

Sonically, as well as chronologically, "Miles Away" was a transitional song in Foxx's catalogue, its instrumentation being heavy with synthesizers, as in previous solo releases, but also featuring the acoustic drum sound that would characterise his remaining 1980s work. No detail on the electronics used in the song appeared on the original single's sleeve, however Foxx's studio equipment at the time included an ARP Odyssey, a Minimoog, an Elka 'String Machine', and an ARP Analog Sequencer.

The fanfare-like synthesizer lines of "Miles Away" were reminiscent of the track "Slow Motion" which opened the album Systems of Romance, Foxx's last with former band Ultravox. Regarding the song's title and subject matter, Foxx said "You know when you're looking out of a window or you're not quite present, you know you're with someone but your mind is on something else, and that is quite often my state of mind I think, so I decided to write a song about it."

The lyrics and cover photograph also appear to reference 'The Quiet Man', an alternate character developed by Foxx in the late 1970s that personified detachment and observation ("I'm a new man when I walk away"). Foxx has described The Quiet Man as habitually wearing an undistinguished grey suit that he (Foxx) found in an Oxfam shop. The picture sleeve of "Miles Away" depicts such a "grey suit, white shirt and dark tie", arranged across a lounge chair.

The B-side, "A Long Time", was written and performed with Shake Shake, a group comprising Duncan Bridgeman and Jo Dworniak, along with Philip Roberts, all of whom would appear on Foxx's next album, The Garden. The track's psychedelic flavour foreshadowed Foxx's The Golden Section (1983).

The single made #51 in the UK charts in November 1980. "Miles Away" appears on the 1993, 2001 reissues of Metamatic and on the 2008 reissue of The Garden, which also features an "alternative version" of the song. It also appears on the John Foxx compilations "Modern Art" (2001), "Glimmer" (2008) and "Metadelic" (2013). A live version performed by John Foxx and Louis Gordon is featured on the album "Neuro Video", recorded at The Luminaire in London, on 24 November 2007.
"A Long Time" appears on the 1993 reissue of Metamatic and 2001 edition of The Garden while an "alternative version" appears on the 2008 re-issue of "The Golden Section".

== Track listing ==
1. "Miles Away" (John Foxx) – 3:16
2. "A Long Time" (Foxx, Jo Dworniak, Duncan Bridgeman, Philip Roberts) – 3:30

== Personnel ==
- John Foxx – synthesizers, vocals
- Edward Case – drums on "Miles Away"
- Duncan Bridgeman – synthesizers, sequencer on "A Long Time"
- Jo Dworniak – bass on "A Long Time"
- Philip Roberts – drums on "A Long Time"
