= Glimmer =

Glimmer may refer to:

- GLIMMER, a gene prediction software package

== Music ==
- Glimmer, a 1999 album by Sundown
- The Glimmer Twins, a pseudonym used by Mick Jagger and Keith Richards of The Rolling Stones
- "Glimmer" (song), a song by Delerium
- "Glimmer", the B-side to John Foxx's song "No-One Driving"
- Glimmer Best of John Foxx, a 2008 compilation album
- "Glimmer", a song by Tame Impala from the 2020 album The Slow Rush

== Film and TV ==
- Glimmer (She-Ra), a television cartoon character
- Gateway to Glimmer, alternate name for the video game Spyro 2: Ripto's Rage!
- Glimmer (or glim), a reflective device used for cheating in poker or other card games
- Glimmer, a character in The Hunger Games trilogy
- Starlight Glimmer, a character in the series My Little Pony: Friendship Is Magic
