= Mysterious Ways =

Mysterious Ways may refer to:

- "Mysterious Ways" (song), a song by U2 from the 1991 album Achtung Baby
- Mysterious Ways (TV series), science-fiction television series which ran from 2000 to 2002
- Mysterious Ways, a 1990 album by Steve Ashley
- Mysterious Ways, a 2001 album by Michael Whalen

== See also ==
- In Mysterious Ways, a 1985 album by John Foxx 1985
- "God Moves in Mysterious Ways", hymn by William Cowper (1731–1800)
