= Translucence/Drift Music =

Studio album by Harold Budd and John Foxx
- Released: 25 August 2003
- Genre: Ambient
- Length: 100:00
- Label: Demon Records / Edsel
- Producer: Harold Budd, John Foxx

Harold Budd chronology
La Bella Vista (2003)	Translucence/Drift Music (2003)	Avalon Sutra / As Long as I Can Hold My Breath (2005)

John Foxx chronology
Cathedral Oceans II (2003)	Translucence/Drift Music (2003)	Crash and Burn (2003)

Translucence/Drift Music is a double studio album by American ambient musician Harold Budd and English musician and graphic artist John Foxx, which was released on 25 August 2003. Budd and Foxx had long been engaged by the other's work, eventually working together in 1996. These two discs are a record of those sessions.

== Track listing ==
All tracks composed by Harold Budd and John Foxx.

=== Translucence (disc one) ===
1. "Subtext" – 5:59
2. "Spoken Roses" – 6:20
3. "Momentary Architecture" – 1:40
4. "Adult" – 3:03
5. "Long Light" – 3:54
6. "A Change in the Weather" – 2:41
7. "Here and Now" – 3:59
8. "Almost Overlooked" – 2:30
9. "Implicit" – 5:25
10. "Raindust" – 7:08
11. "Missing Person" – 1:35
12. "You Again" – 3:24

=== Drift Music (disc two) ===
1. "Sunlight Silhouette" – 3:15
2. "The Other Room" – 1:57
3. "Some Way Through All the Cities" – 4:17
4. "Stepping Sideways" – 3:44
5. "A Delicate Romance" – 7:14
6. "Linger" – 1:59
7. "Curtains Blowing" – 3:06
8. "Weather Patterns" – 1:50
9. "Coming into Focus" – 5:02
10. "After All This Time" – 6:54
11. "Someone Almost There" – 1:33
12. "Resonant Frequency" – 2:45
13. "Avenue of Trees" – 1:16
14. "Underwater Flowers" – 6:05
15. "Arriving" – 1:25
