= Burning Car =

Single by John Foxx
- B-side: "20th Century"
- Released: 11 July 1980
- Recorded: 1980
- Studio: Pathway Studios, London
- Genre: New wave, synthpop, electronic
- Length: 3:13
- Label: Virgin; VS 360
- Songwriter: John Foxx
- Producer: John Foxx

John Foxx singles chronology
"No-One Driving" (1980)	"Burning Car" (1980)	"My Face" (1980)

"Burning Car" is a song by John Foxx, released as a single on 11 July 1980. It was his third solo single, following "Underpass" and "No-One Driving" earlier in the year. The track was not included on Foxx's debut solo album Metamatic, post-dating its January 1980 release, but has been included as a bonus track on the 2001 and 2007 CD reissues. It was Foxx's last 1980s record in a hard-edged electronica style (his next single, "Miles Away", featured acoustic drums and a somewhat warmer production).

"Burning Car" developed the futurist style of Metamatic and was pacier than most of the album's material. Its staccato introduction was reminiscent of the metallic guitar notes that kicked off the track "Some of Them" from Systems of Romance, Foxx's last album with former band Ultravox. The title came from a chapter in J. G. Ballard's SF novel Concrete Island and its automobile reference was shared by a number of tracks on Metamatic. The B-side, "20th Century", was used as the theme for the London Weekend Television arts and music show 20th Century Box.

The songs were recorded in the same "eight-track cupboard in Islington" as Metamatic, and again engineered by Gareth Jones. No instrumentation credits appeared on the original single, however Foxx's studio equipment at the time included ARP Odyssey and Minimoog synthesizers, an Elka 'String Machine', a Roland CR-78 drum machine, an ARP Analog Sequencer and various phasing and flanger units. The recording of "Burning Car" features a prominent use of the "metal beat" hi-hat sound from the CR-78; Foxx used the name Metal Beat for his own record label.

The single made #35 in the UK charts and was also released in picture disc form with a different image to the original cover. "Burning Car" appears on the John Foxx compilations Assembly (1992), Modern Art (2001) and Metatronic (2010), and both the A and B-sides are included on the 2001 and 2007 reissue of Metamatic (the 1993 edition had featured only "20th Century"). Extended live versions of both songs appear on Foxx's album Subterranean Omnidelic Exotour (1998) with Louis Gordon (reissued in 2002 as the second of a 2-disc set, The Golden Section Tour + The Omnidelic Exotour). "Burning Car"'s style and subject matter have been echoed in Foxx's recent original albums with Louis Gordon: Shifting City, Pleasures of Electricity and Crash and Burn.

An "early version" of "Burning Car" is included on the 2010 Metatronic compilation.

The song remains a John Foxx standard and is regularly performed live, also by the new formation of John Foxx and the Maths featuring additional violin played by Hannah Peel as documented on the 2010 live performance Analogue Circuit CD/DVD (issued 2013).

== Track listing ==
1. "Burning Car" (John Foxx) – 3:13
2. "20th Century" (John Foxx) – 3:05

=== Picture disc ===
The single was also issued as a 7" picture disc with the same catalogue number. The A side features a reflected image of Foxx against venetian blinds while the B side features a burning car, the same image as used for the reverse of the regular 7" picture sleeve.

=== Japanese EP ===
"Burning Car" is also the title and lead-track of a six track John Foxx vinyl EP issued in 1981 in Japan only.

1. Burning Car 3:14
2. 20th Century 3:05
3. This City 3:06
4. Miles Away 3:26
5. A Long Time 3:50
6. Mr. No 3:16

The record is housed in a grey die-cut sleeve with over-sized 6" picture photo labels of John Foxx. "Miles Away" is John Foxx's successive single release with "A Long Time" as the B side. However this version of "Miles Away" is slightly different from the standard 7" single and can be found on the Edsel Records reissue of The Garden CD album (EDSD 2014) where it is known as the "Alternative Version".

=== Karborn Dubterror remix ===
- A: Burning Car (Dubterror remix)
- B: 20th century (Dubterror remix)

September 2008, Metamatic Records, META 17, 12" vinyl limited edition. This remix of Burning Car also available on Glimmer (Best of John Foxx) compilation album.

=== 20th Century ===
An edit of "20th Century", the B side to "Burning Car", was used as the theme tune to the Janet Street-Porter produced LWT series 20th Century Box (later Twentieth Century Box). The weekly programme hosted by reporter Danny Baker covered topical issues for young people. Musical trends were also covered, including an early episode on the group Spandau Ballet before they had a recording contract, and Depeche Mode as part of the new "electro-disco" scene. The show ran from June, 1980 to September, 1982.

The track was revived by Foxx for live performances with Louis Gordon from 1998 onwards, as documented on the albums Subterranean Omnidelic Exotour (1997), Retro Future (2007) and A New Kind Of Man (2008). In later live performances the single lyric "twentieth century!" is modified to "twenty-first century!".

The studio version of "20th Century" was included on re-issues of the Metamatic album in 2001 and 2007.

== Personnel ==
- John Foxx – rhythm machine (Roland CR-78), synthesizers, vocals
