= Miles Away =

Miles Away may refer to:

- Miles Away (band), an Australian hardcore punk band
- Miles Away (album), an album by Madlib
- "Miles Away" (John Foxx song)
- "Miles Away" (Madonna song)
- "Miles Away" (Winger song)
- "Miles Away", a 1999 song by A from 'A' vs. Monkey Kong
- "Miles Away", a 2019 song by Armin van Buuren from Balance
- "Miles Away", a 1981 song by Colin Blunstone
- "Miles Away", a 2001 song by Yeah Yeah Yeahs from Yeah Yeah Yeahs
- "Miles Away", a 2014 song by Philip Selway from Weatherhouse
- "Miles Away", a 2015 song by The Maine from American Candy
- "Miles Away", a 2020 song by Knuckle Puck from 20/20
