= Underpass (disambiguation) =

An underpass is a road or railway passing under another road.

It may also refer to:

- "Underpass", a song by John Foxx
- Underpass (crossing), a tunnel for pedestrians
