= John Foxx and the Maths =

British musical project

- Origin: London, England
- Genre: Electronic
- Years active: 2009–present
- Label: Metamatic Records
- Members: John Foxx; Benge; Robin Simon; Hannah Peel
- Website: John Foxx and the Maths blog

John Foxx and the Maths is a musical project featuring electronic music pioneer John Foxx, Benge and more recently Hannah Peel. The group specialises in the use of analogue synthesizers and drum machines. It was initially a studio based project working from Benge's studio in Shoreditch, London but has also engaged in live work.

== Band history ==
Although it had been mentioned on Foxx's official Myspace blog in March 2009 that he "had been doing some recording with Benge", it was not until December of that year that the official John Foxx website Metamatic officially announced Foxx's new musical project. Benge had also already broken the news on his own blog in November calling The Maths "a new album project". An initial single "Destination"/"September Town" was released in December 2009 as download only from Townsend Recordsand later via iTunes. The duo continued to work in Benge's studio in Shoreditch throughout 2010 and some new tracks were previewed at the Short Circuit electronic music festival held at The Roundhouse in London on 5 June 2010. The performances were later released on the Analogue Circuit live album in 2012.

=== Interplay ===
An album entitled Interplay was announced in January 2011 and released on 21 March. The album gained much critical acclaim, with The Quietus calling it "one of the finest electronic records you will hear in 2011." This album features Mira Aroyo of Ladytron on vocals and synthesizers.

Another live event featuring John Foxx and the Maths originally scheduled for December 2010 was held in April 2011. 'Back to the Phuture' was billed as a special electronic music event – featuring live sets from John Foxx, Gary Numan, Mirrors and Motor – plus a DJ set by Mute Records founder Daniel Miller.

A cover version of the Pink Floyd track "Have a Cigar" was recorded for a tribute CD issued by Mojo magazine with their October 2011 issue. It was announced shortly afterwards that the version on the CD was not the completed version and a free download of the finished version was offered via the Mojo website.

=== Interplay Tour ===
A nine date UK tour by John Foxx and the Maths was announced in July 2011, plus live performances in Poland and Belgium. The setlist comprised mostly tracks from Interplay as well as tracks from Foxx's career with Ultravox and from his seminal electronic solo album Metamatic. The group was augmented by Serafina Steer on keyboards and bass and Hannah Peel on keyboards and violin.

On 28 October 2011, it was announced that the final UK date in Holmfirth and the performance at the Sinners Day Festival in Belgium had to be cancelled as Foxx had suffered a fall and minor accident.

=== The Shape of Things and Evidence ===
A second album The Shape of Things was also announced prior to the tour and was initially only on available for purchase at tour venues. The Shape of Things was issued as a limited edition special package, and described as being "a lot rougher around the edges and more experimental than "Interplay" – with songs and stark, minimal sketches..mixed in with some instrumental interludes". The release was preceded by a preview of the track "Talk" on YouTube in September 2011.

The album also comprises a second disc of remixes of selected Interplay tracks, and a brand new track, "Where You End And I Begin" featuring American producer/musician/remixer and score composer Tara Busch who had been photographed and filmed working in Benge's studio, and who supported The Maths on some of their live shows. The track was previewed on SoundCloud before the official release.

When released via Townsend Records on 31 October 2011, the album was described as "though not overtly auto-biographical, there is a sense of looking back over a life and exploring feelings of loss over opportunities and lovers missed, and possible futures that will remain unlived".

Online music site The Quietus placed The Shape of Things at no. 48 in their 100 Albums of the Year for 2012.

Following further writing and recording by John Foxx and Benge as well as live performances in the summer of 2012, a third album Evidence was released via Metamatic Records on 24 September 2012. The album brings together various new collaborations with contemporary artists such as The Soft Moon, Gazelle Twin, Xeno & Oaklander, Tara Busch and Matthew Dear. The cover version of Pink Floyd's "Have A Cigar", previously released by Mojo magazine, also featured.

=== Analogue Circuit ===
On 15 October 2012, a DVD and double CD package entitled Analogue Circuit was released through Metamatic Records. Analogue Circuit: Live At The Roundhouse features the first ever live John Foxx DVD, plus a double audio album of the show, filmed during the performance at the Short Circuit event at the London venue on 5 June 2010. The discs feature tracks from John Foxx's years with Ultravox, his solo career and a preview of then still unreleased new tracks by John Foxx and the Maths. Personnel include former Ultravox guitarist Robin Simon, Benge, Jean-Gabriel Becker, Jori Hulkkonen, Serafina Steer, Steve D'Agostino and Liam Hutton. Tracks performed during the show with Louis Gordon were deemed unsuitable for release because of technical issues during the recording and filming.

=== 2013 ===
In January 2013, it was announced that John Foxx and the Maths would once more be playing live as support to Orchestral Manoeuvres in the Dark (OMD) on their forthcoming UK tour to promote their new album English Electric, in April and May of the same year. It was further confirmed that Hannah Peel would be joining John Foxx and Benge for the live performances.

The Evidence album was released worldwide on 25 February 2013.

In early April 2013, it was announced that the band would be releasing a new album, Rhapsody on 26 April 2013, which was to coincide with the band taking to the road again to support OMD on their English Electric tour. The 13 date tour ran from 28 April to 14 May 2013. The three-piece band performed nine songs from both Foxx's solo and The Maths repertoires and were generally positively received by OMD fans. In a further collaboration with that group, a John Foxx and the Maths remix of their track "Dresden" was issued as part of the single release package.

The release of Rhapsody was delayed due to production problems and was not available on the tour. It was finally released on 10 May.

The band's only headlined live show for 2013 was held on 7 June at the Brighton Concorde 2.

In November, new videos for the track Evidence and Talk were published on official video channels, promoted via Foxx's official Facebook page and Twitter account. The videos, described as being 'Tokyo noir', were filmed and directed by Macoto Tezka in Tokyo, Japan 2013.

=== The Machine Stops and The Machine ===
At the end of 2015, the York Theatre Royal announced a new production of E. M. Forster's short story The Machine Stops featuring a brand new soundtrack composed by John Foxx and Benge. T Foxx said The Machine Stops "I’d read it in 1964 when I was at school and it had fascinated me then", adding that his love of Yorkshire, where he lived as a lecturer at Leeds College of Art, was a further reason for his interest in the collaboration. The soundtrack was finalised in May 2016 and a one-off performance by Foxx and Benge called "The Bunker Experience", followed by a Q&A session was held in the York Cold War Bunker on 9 May. A digital-only EP of six tracks based on the soundtrack were made available on Bandcamp on 28 June, with the note that "A studio album by JF&TM of the complete soundtrack will be released by Metamatic Recordings in the next 12 months" In December 2016, it was announced that the finished album is to be released on 10 February 2017.

=== 2016: A Man, a Woman and a City ===
A seventeen track compilation of John Foxx's work from 2000 - 2015 titled 21st Century: A Man, a Woman and a City was issued on 29 April 2016. The compilation featured several previously available tracks by John Foxx and the Maths as well as two brand new John Foxx and the Maths tracks, "A Many Splendoured Thing" and "A Man and a Woman", a new re-working of "Talk" featuring Gary Numan and two previously unreleased John Foxx and the Maths remixes by OMD and ADULT. The deluxe edition also included a DVD consisting of 11 films created by Macoto Tezka with music by John Foxx and the Maths. A digital download of three previously unreleased John Foxx and the Maths live recordings featuring Foxx, Benge and Hannah Peel at MemeTune Studios were also available from the online store as part of the deluxe package.

=== 2020: Howl ===
In February 2020, news was published of a brand new John Foxx and the Maths album titled Howl, due out on 15 May. The album was delayed and eventually released on 24 July. The title track was made available on selected streaming sites and for download, also as an edited version. The album and lead single, features former Foxx-era Ultravox guitarist Robin Simon, joining Benge and Hannah Peel as part of The Maths after previously guesting with them at their debut Roundhouse show in 2010.

== Discography ==
=== Albums ===
==== Studio albums ====
- Interplay (March 2011)
- The Shape of Things (October 2011)
- Evidence (September 2012)
- The Machine (February 2017)
- Howl (July 2020)

==== Live albums ====
- Analogue Circuit : Live at the Roundhouse live DVD + double CD (October 2012)
- Rhapsody (live in the studio) (May 2013)

==== Remix albums ====
- The Good Shadow (2014) originally the 2nd disc from the 2CD version of The Shape of Things.

==== Compilation albums ====
- 21st Century: A Man, a Woman and a City (2016) - John Foxx compilation album featuring several tracks released as John Foxx and the Maths.

=== Singles ===
- "Destination" / "September Town" (December 2009) - digital download only
- "Evergreen" (radio edit) (September 2011) - digital download only
- "A Falling Star" (Gazelle Twin remix) (October 2011) - limited edition single track CD-R, signed by John Foxx included in tour VIP package
- "Howl" (February 2020)

=== Other tracks ===
- "Have a Cigar" - Pink Floyd cover version for Mojo magazine, October 2011 (later included on the Evidence album)
- "Back 2 U" - by The Maths written and recorded by Benge and released on the BYE Programme 5 on Mixcloud. The mix also features the John Foxx and the Maths track, "Walk"

=== Remixes by John Foxx and the Maths ===
- "Changelings" (John Foxx and the Maths remix) by Gazelle Twin on the album The Entire City Remixed (2012)
- "Dresden" (John Foxx and the Maths remix) by OMD from the "Dresden" single EP, released May 2013
- "Where Is Kittin?" (John Foxx and the Maths remix) by Marc Houle and Miss Kittin, "Where Is Kittin" EP, May 2013
- "Tonight, We Fall" (John Foxx and the Maths remix) by ADULT. on "Tonight, We Fall" single, August 2013.
- "Blood Diamonds" (John Foxx and the Maths remix) by Simple Minds (includes backing vocals by John Foxx). Released via Beatport, November 2013.
