= Unflesh =

Studio album by Gazelle Twin
- Released: 22 September 2014
- Recorded: 2014
- Genre: Electronic; industrial pop; experimental
- Length: 38:36
- Label: Gazelle Twin; Anti-Ghost Moon Ray; Last Gang
- Producer: Gazelle Twin; Benge

Gazelle Twin chronology
The Entire City (2012)	Unflesh (2014)	Pastoral (2018)

Singles from Unflesh
- 1. "Belly of the Beast" Released: 3 March 2014; 2. "Anti Body" Released: 7 April 2014; 3. "GUTS" Released: 2 May 2014; 4. "Human Touch" Released: 2 May 2014

Unflesh is the second studio album by English electronic music project Gazelle Twin of composer, producer and musician Elizabeth Bernholz. It was released in the United Kingdom on 22 September 2014 to critical acclaim.

== Production ==
Bernholz discussed developing the tracks: "Beats are the most instinctive thing to begin with as I get sense of something moving forward. I always find that a beat and a baseline work best to form the skeleton of a track, but sometimes it's good to shake things up and do it differently. I really like to loop found or homemade samples and hear melodies, or beats or harmonic overtones in those, and start building from there. Other times I'll start with a vocal line and build outwards."

Bernholz made Unflesh using the digital audio workstation Ableton. She wrote, recorded and produced all the material at home, and then went to MemeTune, an analogue studio in London, where she worked with Benge for additional production and mixing. All the tracks were mixed using a 1974 MCI console, Bernholz reasoning that "Anything sounds better through an analogue desk like that."

== Composition ==
The writing process of Unflesh was simplified from Gazelle Twin's previous albums, resulting in a more direct and lo-fi sound and sharing only minimal connections with The Entire City. The record is more spoken word than melodic. Guy Mankowski described Unflesh lyrically as a "post-Kid A album, an extended critique of postmodern living". Euthanasia, miscarriage, European colonization, personal upbringing, and body dysmorphia are among the subjects present on the album.

The soundscapes were partly inspired by Bernholz' two-year study of science of medicine. In the words of Drowned in Sound writer Tristan Bath, instrumentation of "skittering beats" and "squeamishly thin synth tones" remain present throughout the album, with Bernholz' vocals "on top more often than not twisted unrecognisably into that of a demonic robot." Her voice changes constantly, writing that there are "several songs applying layer upon layer of densely mutated vocal tracks (as on the title track) while others remain clean in favour of the lyrics ('I Feel Blood')." The synths were noted to be influenced by Iggy Pop and John Carpenter. Artrocker's Finola Doran described the record as "like a piece of art rather than music one would sing and dance to", while in contrast, Robert Whitfield noted Unflesh to be "surprisingly danceable record amidst all the dark beats".

== Critical reception ==
Professional ratings
Aggregate scores
Source	Rating
AnyDecentMusic?	7.7/10
Metacritic	83/100
Review scores
Source	Rating
Drowned in Sound	8/10
Exclaim!	9/10
musicOMH	4/5 stars
NME	7/10
PopMatters	9/10
Q	4/5 stars
Uncut	8/10

Unflesh was met with critical acclaim upon release, holding an aggregated 83 out of 100 from Metacritic based on eight reviews. It was named album of the year by The Quietus.

== Accolades ==
Year	Country	Publication/Author	Accolade	Rank
2014	United Kingdom	The 405	The 30 Best Albums of 2014	23
2014	United Kingdom	musicOMH	Top 100 Albums of 2014	79
2014	United States	NPR Music	The Ten Best Electronic Albums of 2014	4
2014	United Kingdom	The Quietus	Albums of the Year 2014	1
2014	United Kingdom	Uncut	Top 75 Albums of 2014	63

== Track listing ==
All tracks are written by Gazelle Twin

No.	Title	Length
1.	"Unflesh"	3:25
2.	"GUTS"	3:02
3.	"Exorcise"	4:20
4.	"Good Death"	3:23
5.	"Anti Body"	3:19
6.	"Child"	2:30
7.	"Premonition"	3:19
8.	"A1 Receptor"	0:25
9.	"Belly of the Beast"	3:00
10.	"Human Touch"	4:00
11.	"I Feel Blood"	3:32
12.	"Still Life"	4:21
Total length:		38:36

== Personnel ==
Credits are adapted from the liner notes of Gazelle Twin's official bandcamp.

=== Musician ===
- Gazelle Twin – vocals

=== Technical personnel ===
- Gazelle Twin – production, recording, mixing
- Benge – additional production, mixing
- Shawn Joseph – mastering

=== Artwork ===
- Gazelle Twin – artwork
- Barnbrook – typography
