= D.N.A. (John Foxx album) =

Studio album by John Foxx
- Released: 2 June 2010
- Genre: Electronic
- Length: 44:31
- Label: Metamatic Records
- Producer: John Foxx

John Foxx chronology
The Quiet Man (2009)	D.N.A. (2010)	B-Movie (Ballardian Video Neuronica) (2014)

Released in 2010, D.N.A. is a CD/DVD set of music and video collaborations between John Foxx and some of his favorite filmmakers, including Karborn, Macoto Tzeka, Ian Emes, Jonathan Barnbrook and Steve D'Augostino.

== Track listing ==
=== CD ===
1. Maybe Tomorrow (3:58)
2. Kaiyagura (4:02)
3. City of Mirage (7:34)
4. Flightpath Tegel (4:07)
5. Violet Bloom (4:10)
6. Phantom Lover (4:48)
7. A Secret Life 7 (2:39)
8. A Secret Life 2 (9:37)
9. Over the Mirage (4:56)

All tracks written by John Foxx except Violet Bloom written by D'Agostino & Foxx, A Secret Life 7 and A Secret Life 2 written by D'Agostino, Foxx & Jansen, and Over the Mirage written by Budd, Foxx & Garcia.

=== DVD ===
1. Maybe Tomorrow (by Karborn)
2. Violet Bloom (by Steve D'Augustino)
3. Flightpath Tegel (by Ian Emes)
4. A Secret Life 2 (by Ian Emes)
5. City of Mirage (by Macoto Tezka)
6. Kaiyagura (by Macoto Tezka)
7. Over the Mirage (by Macoto Tezka)
8. A Half-Remembered Sentence from The Quiet Man (by Jonathan Barnbrook)
9. Clicktrack (by Jonathan Barnbrook)

== Personnel ==
- John Foxx
- Steve D'Augostino
- Karborn
- Macoto Tzeka
- Jonathan Barnbrook
- Ian Emes
