= Black Dog (album) =

Studio album by Gazelle Twin
- Released: 27 October 2023
- Length: 40:49
- Label: Invada
- Producer: Gazelle Twin

Gazelle Twin chronology
Deep England (2021)	Black Dog (2023)

Singles from Black Dog
- 1. "Black Dog" Released: 4 September 2023; 2. "Fear Keeps Us Alive" Released: 3 October 2023; 3. "A Door Opens" Released: 26 October 2023

Black Dog is the fourth solo studio album (fifth overall) by English electronic music project Gazelle Twin of composer, producer, and musician Elizabeth Bernholz. It was released on 27 October 2023 through Invada Records. The album received acclaim from critics.

== Background ==
Bernholz announced the album on 4 September 2023, calling it an "album of confrontation, childhood fears and how they manifest in adulthood". The project was announced to be another "step forward and a grippingly brilliant game changer". Bernholz herself thought Black Dog was the "rawest thing" she had ever made, soon realising that she was not writing "about ghosts" but her own "mental state". She tried to confront her "demons of the past" and hoped to demonstrate that there is hope for those who feel "trapped between these two states of being". Unlike her previous works, she decided not to cover her face for this album as she found no "relevant look" to fit the record.

== Critical reception ==
Professional ratings
Aggregate scores
Source	Rating
Metacritic	90/100
Review scores
Source	Rating
Mojo	4/5 stars
MusicOMH	4/5 stars
PopMatters	9/10
Uncut	4.5/5 stars

At Metacritic, which assigns a normalized rating out of 100 to reviews from professional critics, the album received an average score of 90 based on four reviews, indicating "universal acclaim". Spyros Stasis of PopMatters called Black Dog the sum of Gazelle Twin's "past strange adventures" that also "forges a new path" for the musician. Stasis thought that this path manages to "surpass" "disparate aspects" of her past output. The staff at Uncut went as far as labeling the album a "mighty musical exorcism". Writing for The Quietus, Lottie Brazier named Black Dog their album of the week, calling it a record of "disarming vocal force" influenced by "childhood nightmares and uncanny reminders".

Steven Johnson of MusicOMH saw Black Dog as the return to "typically unsettling, sinister and nightmarish" material, giving the listener an "uneasy listening" experience that is "impossible to ignore", demanding attention for "its unrelenting power and undisguised starkness". Likewise, the editors at Mojo applauded Gazelle Twin for including "evocative sonic components" that slowly ceases halfway through the album but does not affect the "overall consistency".

Black Dog appeared on the year-end list from The Quietus, who rated it the 26th best album of 2023.

== Track listing ==
All tracks are written by Elizabeth Bernholz.

Black Dog track listing
No.	Title	Length
1.	"I Disappear"	5:11
2.	"Sweet Dream"	1:45
3.	"Black Dog"	4:35
4.	"Fear Keeps Us Alive"	3:47
5.	"The Long Room"	0:28
6.	"Two Worlds"	3:57
7.	"Unstoppable Force"	4:48
8.	"This House"	4:36
9.	"Author of You"	4:49
10.	"Walk Through Walls"	3:46
11.	"A Door Opens"	3:07
Total length:		40:49

== Charts ==
Chart performance for Black Dog
Chart (2023)	Peak position
UK Album Downloads (OCC)	28
