= Cathedral Oceans II =

Studio album by John Foxx
- Released: 2 June 2003
- Recorded: Ground Zero and Metamatic Mobile
- Genre: Ambient
- Label: Metamatic Records
- Producer: John Foxx

John Foxx chronology
| The Pleasures of Electricity (2001) | Cathedral Oceans II (2003) | Crash and Burn (2003) |

Cathedral Oceans II is an album of instrumental ambient music by John Foxx. It was released on 2 June 2003 as disc two of a two disc set, the first disc being the original Cathedral Oceans album, now renamed Cathedral Oceans I. The second album follows on from the first in style and substance.

The back cover of the CD digipack introduces the combined track listing as "...music for a vast, half-submerged ruined cathedral...". Cathedral Oceans III was released two years later. On 25 October 2010 all three albums were reissued as The Complete Cathedral Oceans, a 3CD set including a DVD of Cathedral Oceans III, and on 2 September 2016 released on five 12-inch vinyl records in a hardback album book set.

== Track listing ==
- All tracks written by John Foxx.
1. "Revolving Birdsong"
2. "Shimmer Symmetry"
3. "Far and Wide 2"
4. "Ad Infinitum"
5. "Quiet Splendour"
6. "Luminous and Gone"
7. "Stillness and Wonder"
8. "Return to a Place of Remembered Beauty"
9. "Visible and Invisible"
