= Crash and Burn (John Foxx and Louis Gordon album) =

Studio album by John Foxx and Louis Gordon
- Released: 30 June 2003
- Genre: Electronic
- Label: Metamatic Records
- Producers: John Foxx, Louis Gordon

John Foxx chronology
Translucence/Drift Music (2003)	Crash and Burn (2003)	Cathedral Oceans III (2005)

Louis Gordon chronology
The Pleasures of Electricity (2001)	Crash and Burn (2003)	Closed Gone Fishing (2006)

Crash and Burn is the third studio album by John Foxx and Louis Gordon, released on 30 June 2003. The duo did a series of live performances to promote the album, as well as supporting The Human League on their "Very Best Of" tour the same year.

The album was re-released on 29 November 2010 as a double-disc edition with the original tracks remastered and a bonus disc featuring five previously unreleased tracks, namely "Labyrinth Generator", "Storm Warning", "Broadway Submarine", "Dust and Light" (Live) and "Invisible Women V2" (Live), as well as material from 2003's limited edition "Drive EP". The accompanying booklet was expanded to twenty pages, and includes all of the lyrics.

A similar double disc edition of Foxx and Gordon's album Sideways was also released on the same date.

The cover image is taken from a close-up used in the RKO film The Spiral Staircase.

== Track listing ==
All tracks written by John Foxx and Louis Gordon.

=== Original release ===
1. "Drive" – 6:55
2. "Cinema" – 5:09
3. "Broken Furniture" – 5:25
4. "Crash and Burn" – 4:03
5. "Once in a While" – 4:10
6. "Sex Video" – 5:00
7. "Sidewalking" – 6:12
8. "Ultraviolet / Infrared" – 5:14
9. "She Robot" – 4:46
10. "Dust and Light" – 6:45
11. "Ray 1 / Ray 2" – 5:10
12. "Smoke" – 7:11

=== 2010 re-release ===
Disc One, as above

Bonus disc

1. "Making Movies"
2. "Your Shadow"
3. "Underwater Dreamsex"
4. "Labyrinth Generator"
5. "Broken Furniture (Live from a Room)"
6. "UltraViolet / InfraRed (Live from a Room)"
7. "Nightlife (Live from a Room)"
8. "Storm Warning"
9. "Sex Video (Live from a Room)"
10. "Broadway Submarine"
11. "Dust And Light" (live)
12. "Invisible Women V2" (live)

Tracks 1–3 previously available on The Drive EP (2003). Tracks 5–7 & 9 previously available on the album Live from a Room (As Big As a City) (2006). Tracks 4, 8, 10–12 previously unavailable.

== Personnel ==
- John Foxx – vocals, synthesisers
- Louis Gordon – synthesizers, engineer
- Roger Lyons – mastering
- Dallas Simpson – re-mastering
