= Pastoral (album) =

2018 studio album by Gazelle Twin

Studio album by Gazelle Twin
- Released: 21 September 2018
- Recorded: 2014–2018
- Genres: Electronic; avant-pop
- Length: 37:23
- Label: Anti-Ghost Moon Ray
- Producer: Gazelle Twin

Gazelle Twin chronology
Unflesh (2014)	Pastoral (2018)

Singles from Pastoral
- 1. "Hobby Horse" Released: 22 June 2018; 2. "Glory" Released: 7 July 2018

Pastoral is the third studio album by English electronic music project Gazelle Twin of composer, producer, and musician Elizabeth Bernholz. It was released on 21 September 2018 by Anti-Ghost Moon Ray Records.

Two singles were released to promote the album: "Hobby Horse" and "Glory", both accompanied by music videos.

== Background ==
Originally, Pastoral was to be based on "the bizarre desires related to objects" but the idea got rejected later on.

On the album, Bernholz was inspired by rural life as well as Brexit. She defined the album as her "re-addressing what it means to be English in the face of changing political mood".

== Critical reception ==
Professional ratings
Aggregate scores
Source	Rating
AnyDecentMusic?	8.1/10
Metacritic	81/100
Review scores
Source	Rating
Drowned in Sound	10/10
The Line of Best Fit	8/10
Loud and Quiet	9/10
Mojo	4/5 stars
MusicOMH	4.5/5 stars
Pitchfork	7.7/10
PopMatters	8/10 stars
The Skinny	5/5 stars
Spectrum Culture	4/5 stars
Uncut	7/10

At Metacritic, which assigns a normalized rating out of 100 to reviews, Pastoral received an average score of 81, based on 11 reviews, indicating "universal acclaim". Bekki Bemrose of Drowned in Sound stated that the album is "a towering work that truly distils all of its maker's talents into a unified whole", giving the album a score 10 out of 10. PopMatters' Spyro Stasis called Pastoral a "sardonic reconfiguration of avant-pop" that "re-interprets electronic music through an early music/folk lens" while writing in his review that it is "bizzare" in "the most positive way" and that "its amalgamation of traditional musical concepts within this futuristic pop structure is what makes it so enticing."

The album was ranked as the best album of 2018 by The Quietus adding that it is "a disquieting listen", and "Gazelle Twin shows us that any romantic idea of England is a poisoned chalice".

== Accolades ==
Publication	Accolade	Rank	Ref.
Piccadilly Records	Top 100 Albums of 2018	42	
Rough Trade	Top 100 Albums of 2018	94	
The Quietus	Top 100 Albums of 2018	1	
Uncut Magazine	Top 75 Albums of 2018	31	

== Track listing ==
All tracks are written by Gazelle Twin, except where noted.

No.	Title	Length
1.	"Folly"	1:10
2.	"Better in My Day"	2:49
3.	"Little Lambs"	3:40
4.	"Old Thorn"	2:05
5.	"Dieu et Mon Droit"	3:41
6.	"Throne"	1:36
7.	"Mongrel"	2:41
8.	"Glory"	5:06
9.	"Tea Rooms"	2:40
10.	"Jerusalem"	1:10
11.	"Dance of the Peddlers" (lyrics: Gazelle Twin, William Blake)	3:04
12.	"Hobby Horse"	3:51
13.	"Sunny Stories"	3:11
14.	"Over the Hills" (lyrics: John Tams)	0:39

== Personnel ==
Credits adapted from the liner notes of Pastoral and Bandcamp page.

=== Musicians ===
- Gazelle Twin – composition, recorders, percussion, vocals
- Dave Mooney – performance (track 14)

=== Technical ===
- Gazelle Twin – production, recording, mixing
- Shawn Joseph – mastering

=== Artwork ===
- Gazelle Twin – artwork
- Jonathan Barnbrook – typography, layout
