= From Trash =

Studio album by John Foxx and Louis Gordon
- Released: 6 November 2006
- Genre: Electronic
- Length: 46:14
- Label: Metamatic
- Producer: John Foxx, Louis Gordon

John Foxx chronology
Tiny Colour Movies (2006)	From Trash (2006)	Sideways (2006)

From Trash is the fourth studio album by John Foxx and Louis Gordon, released on 6 November 2006. Further material from the same sessions was released as the 2CD set Sideways on 24 November 2006.

== Track listing ==
1. "From Trash" — 4:34
2. "Freeze Frame" — 3:57
3. "Your Kisses Burn V2" — 5:01
4. "Another You" — 3:47
5. "Impossible" — 5:29
6. "Never Let Me Go" — 3:15
7. "A Room as Big as a City" — 4:40
8. "A Million Cars" — 6:23
9. "Friendly Fire" — 4:59
10. "The One Who Walks Though You" — 4:05
- All tracks written by John Foxx and Louis Gordon.
- An earlier version of "Your Kisses Burn" appeared on the Nation 12 album Electrofear.

== Personnel ==
- John Foxx — vocals, synthesisers
- Louis Gordon — synthesizers
- Dallas Simpson — mastering
- Dennis Leigh, Paul Agar — artwork
