= Dancing Like a Gun =

"Dancing Like A Gun"

Single by John Foxx
- Released: 30 October 1981
- Recorded: The Garden Studios, London, 1981
- Genre: Electronic
- Length: 3:38
- Label: Virgin/Metal Beat; VS 459
- Songwriter: John Foxx
- Producer: John Foxx

John Foxx singles chronology
"Europe After the Rain" (1980)	"Dancing Like A Gun" (1981)	"Endlessly" (1982)

"Dancing Like A Gun" is the title of a John Foxx song, released as a single on 30 October 1981, taken from The Garden album released the previous month.

It was the first John Foxx solo single not to make the Top 75 singles chart in the UK. Smash Hits declared that "despite his recent success Foxxy (sic.) hasn't lived up to his early promise. This has all the ingredients - the pips and the peel - but without the juice".

== Track listing ==
7"

- "Dancing Like A Gun" (3:37)
- "Swimmer 2" (4:06)

12"

- "Dancing Like A Gun" (4:12)
- "Swimmer 1" "Swimmer 2" (8:50)

"Dancing Like A Gun" produced by John Foxx, and engineered by Gareth Jones

"Swimmer 1" and "Swimmer 2" produced by John Foxx engineered by Jo Dworniak. Recorded at Moody Studios.

== Swimmer 1 / 2 ==
These tracks are designated as "Swimmer I" and "Swimmer II" on the vinyl record labels. The 12" version gives a collective running time for the two tracks. They appear on the 2001 CD re-issue of "The Garden" in consecutive order but are wrongly listed in reverse order (Swimmer 2 followed by Swimmer 1). The respective running times are 3:31 and 5:10. "Swimmer 1/I" is the shorter track with a vocal, "Swimmer 2/II" is the longer instrumental track. Both tracks also appeared on the bonus disc for 2008 CD re-issue correctly named but not consecutively.

The 2008 issue also features the tracks "Swimmer III" and "Swimmer IV" previously released on the Meridians C60 cassette compilations on the Touch label in 1983. "Swimmer III" was featured on issue 2 under the name of "The Quiet Man 3" and "Swimmer IV" on issue 1 under the name of "The Quiet Man 4".

"Swimmer II" is the opening track to the 2013 John Foxx compilation album Metadelic, and was also performed live by Foxx and Louis Gordon in 2007 as documented on the Neuro Video live album (2008).
