= The Entire City =

2011 studio album by Gazelle Twin

Studio album by Gazelle Twin
- Released: 11 July 2011
- Recorded: 2009–2011
- Genre: Electronica; art pop; dark wave
- Length: 44:57
- Label: Anti-Ghost Moon Ray
- Producer: Gazelle Twin

Gazelle Twin chronology
The Entire City (2011)	Unflesh (2014)

Singles from The Entire City
- 1. "Changelings" Released: 10 November 2010; 2. "I Am Shell I Am Bone" Released: 25 April 2011; 3. "Men Like Gods" Released: 4 July 2011

The Entire City is the debut studio album by English electronic music project Gazelle Twin of composer, producer and musician Elizabeth Bernholz. It was released on 11 July 2011 by Anti-Ghost Moon Ray Records.

== Background ==
The album was the first one that Bernholz produced. She used Ableton 7 to create it. The artist describes The Entire City as her "landscape album". She further explains that she was "illustrating places and times and alien landscapes, but warped memories too".

== Critical reception ==
Professional ratings
Aggregate scores
Source	Rating
AnyDecentMusic?	7.9/10
Review scores
Source	Rating
Drowned in Sound	8/10
Financial Times	4/5 stars
The Guardian	5/5 stars
musicOMH	4.5/5 stars
NME	8/10

The Entire City garnered critical acclaim upon release. Charlotte Richardson Andrews of The Guardian gave the album a five-star review, calling it a "stunning debut". Simon Price wrote the record "will haunt you long after listening", in his review for The Independent on Sunday. Jazz Monroe, writing for Drowned in Sound, gave it an eight out of ten, opining that "The Entire City - while slippery as a fish out of water, by all accounts - is crystal clear of ambition and concept." He also did another review for NME, giving it a similar score and calling it a "triumph of art-pop splendour – equal parts terror and temerity."

== Track listing ==
All tracks are written by Gazelle Twin.

No.	Title	Length
1.	"The Entire City"	2:23
2.	"Concrete Mother"	4:43
3.	"Men Like Gods"	4:55
4.	"I Am Shell I Am Bone"	4:43
5.	"Far from Home"	1:22
6.	"Changelings"	3:22
7.	"Bell Tower"	2:32
8.	"When I Was Otherwise"	3:50
9.	"Obelisk"	5:11
10.	"Nest"	4:15
11.	"Fight-or-Flight"	1:00
12.	"View of a Mountain"	3:39
13.	"Abandon"	3:02

== Personnel ==
Credits adapted from the liner notes of The Entire City.

- Gazelle Twin – composition, recording, production, lyrics
- Shawn Joseph – mastering (tracks 1–5, 7–13)
- Russ Keffert – mastering (track 6)
- Suzanne Moxhay – artwork
