= The Pleasures of Electricity =

Studio album by John Foxx and Louis Gordon
- Released: 15 September 2001
- Genre: Electronic
- Length: 62:43
- Label: Metamatic Records
- Producer: John Foxx & Louis Gordon

John Foxx chronology
Shifting City (1997)	The Pleasures of Electricity (2001)	Cathedral Oceans II (2003)

Louis Gordon chronology
Shifting City (1997)	The Pleasures of Electricity (2001)	Cathedral Oceans II (2003)

Professional ratings
Review scores
Source	Rating
Allmusic	3/5 stars

The Pleasures of Electricity is an album by John Foxx and Louis Gordon, released on 15 September 2001. It was the duo's second studio album, and Foxx's third after his return to the music scene in 1997.

The album continues along the lines of modern electronics flavoured with early-80s touches that was set out by the duo's 1997 album Shifting City. However, The Pleasures of Electricity is more polished and minimalist than any of Foxx's previous albums (solo or in a group), to the extent that the album sounds almost sterile in places. The lyrics recall themes similar to those in Foxx's classic album Metamatic, dealing with traveling and urban life, including almost bizarre lyrics comparing driving in a car to mathematics in "Automobile" (all this delivered in Foxx's most deadpan voice). "Invisible Women" is a track Foxx originally recorded with Nation 12 over a decade earlier (the version here includes a synth riff recycled from Foxx's single "Underpass" that wasn't included in the Nation 12 version), while "Cities of Light 5" is a further development of "Cities of Light 1" that was also recorded with Nation 12.

The album’s original press release states: “Taking a cue from Kraftwerk, one of Foxx’s most obvious stylistic touchstones, “Pleasures…” is a streamlined monorail of lock-step computer-generated beats and wiry synthesizer melodies with an equal emphasis on dark, atmospherics and energised, danceable rhythms.”

The artwork of the album was designed by Foxx himself, based on his own photography. The main cover depicts a man in a grey suit standing next to a door, his face completely whited out by a bright light that seems to originate from inside him. This, together with the album name, recalled René Magritte's painting Le Principe Du Plaisir, and through it Gary Numan's synthpop classic The Pleasure Principle, the artwork and title of which were inspired by the said painting (sonically The Pleasures of Electricity also resembles The Pleasure Principle and vice versa). In the sleeve notes for the live album The Golden Section Tour + The Omnidelic Exotour Foxx writes of buying a grey suit around 1978 and photographing his friends wearing it, with the face of the person never showing in the pictures. Whether or not the photographs used on The Pleasures of Electricity are from this time is unknown, but based on the description the artwork for this album is similar to Foxx's 1978 photography.

No singles were released from the album, however "Nightlife" was included on the Modern Art compilation released some three months before The Pleasures of Electricity.

A 2CD remastered special edition was released on 19 October 2009. Four tracks on CD1 featured on the original album were significantly remixed - "Nightlife", "Invisible Women", "Cities of Light 5" and "Automobile". Although they feature new sounds and in some cases additional arrangements, they were remixed in the context of the album, and therefore not just added as 'extras' to the package. CD2 features the original mix of the album plus two previously unreleased bonus tracks "Screenplay" and "Twilight Room", thus making it the 'definitive edition' of this album.

== Track listing ==
=== 2001 original release ===
1. "A Funny Thing" — 4:18
2. "Nightlife" — 5:54
3. "Camera" — 7:47
4. "Invisible Women" — 5:55
5. "Cities of Light 5' — 5:26
6. "Uptown / Downtown" — 6:34
7. "When It Rains" — 4:24
8. "Automobile" — 5:56
9. "The Falling Room" — 4:52
10. "Travel" — 6:57
11. "Quiet City" — 5:04
- All tracks written by John Foxx and Louis Gordon.
- On Nation 12's album Electrofear, "Invisible Women" is credited to John Foxx, Shem McAuley, Kurt Rodgers and Simon Rodgers.

=== 2009 Special edition ===
==== CD1 ====
1. "A Funny Thing"
2. "Nightlife" (Alternative Mix)
3. "Camera"
4. "Invisible Women" (Alternative Mix)
5. "Cities of Light" (Alternative Mix)
6. "Uptown – Downtown"
7. "When It Rains"
8. "Automobile" (Alternative Mix)
9. "The Falling Room"
10. "Travel"
11. "Quiet City"

==== CD2 ====
1. "A Funny Thing" (Original Mix)
2. "Nightlife" (Original Mix)
3. "Camera" (Original Mix)
4. "Invisible Women" (Original Mix)
5. "Cities of Light" (Original Mix)
6. "Uptown – Downtown" (Original Mix)
7. "When It Rains" (Original Mix)
8. "Automobile" (Original Mix)
9. "The Falling Room" (Original Mix)
10. "Travel" (Original Mix)
11. "Quiet City" (Original Mix)
12. "Twilight Room" (previously unreleased)
13. "Screenplay" (previously unreleased)
