= Tiny Colour Movies =

Studio album by John Foxx
- Released: 5 June 2006
- Recorded: Metamedia Studios
- Genre: Downtempo/Ambient
- Length: 47 minutes
- Label: Metamatic
- Producer: John Foxx

John Foxx chronology
Electrofear (with Nation 12) (2005)	Tiny Colour Movies (2006)	From Trash (2006)

Tiny Colour Movies is an album by English musician John Foxx, released on 5 June 2006.

== Background ==
Foxx attended a birthday celebration screening of a friend's private film collection in Baltimore. The films in the collection were all short pieces collected from various sources, including surveillance agencies and Hollywood cutting room floors. Foxx was transfixed by the strangeness and beauty of the clips. A few weeks later, Foxx was working on some new pieces of music when he realized he was writing in the aftermath of the film screening. He gave in to the memories and wrote a small collection of musical pieces relating to his memory of the film clips he had seen.

== Track listing ==
1. "Stray Sinatra Neurone"
2. "Lost New York"
3. "Kurfürstendamm"
4. "Skyscraper"
5. "The Projectionist"
6. "Looped Los Angeles"
7. "Points of Departure"
8. "X-Ray Vision"
9. "Smokescreen"
10. "Underwater Automobiles"
11. "A Peripheral Character"
12. "Shadow City"
13. "Interlude"
14. "Thought Experiment"
15. "Hand-Held Skies"

== Personnel ==
- John Foxx – All instruments
- Dallas Simpson – Mastering
