= Karborn =

British mixed-media artist and graphic designer

- Born: John Leigh; May 1, 1985 (age 41)
- Education: Vancouver Film School (Dropped Out)
- Known for: Mixed-media, Graphic design
- Father: John Foxx
- Website: karborn.com

Karborn (born May 1, 1985 as John Leigh) is a British mixed-media artist and graphic designer.

== Early years ==
John Leigh was born on May 1, 1985. His father is the musician and graphic designer John Foxx whose art and synthesizers were formative elements of Leigh's childhood. His mother is a Belgian. As a teenager Leigh developed an interest in digital image manipulation. At the age of 16 he endured a car crash and was shut-in for a longer period of time. During this time he developed the "Karborn" character as his alter ego. In the mid-2000s he was attending Canadian Vancouver Film School with the help of a scholarship from British Computer Arts magazine, though he did not complete his course.

== Career ==
In 2008 Karborn had his first solo exhibition at the Sónar festival in Barcelona. Another solo exhibition happened in London's Brick Lane Gallery. As a graphic designer he developed campaigns for e.g. Adidas, the New York Times, Nike und Wired and worked on campaigns for AKQA, Edelman und Ogilvy & Mather as a freelancer. From May 2019 until March 2020 he illustrated the bi-weekly op-ed column Op-Eds From the Future in the online edition of the New York Times where scientists and creative artists contemplated about the future of society.

== Private life ==
Karborn lives in London, in the Bow area. From October 2017 until early 2018 he was in a relationship with actress Daisy Lowe, which caused a significant news coverage in the English-speaking tabloid press.

== Works ==
Karborn digitally assembles photos into collages which he prints on canvas or other surfaces. In the same way he creates record covers, for example for easy listening project Crombie, hip hop band TRDMRK or the soundtrack of British TV series The Last Post. Occasionally he works metal objects or botanical or other organic materials into the canvas prints. He regularly presents the digital templates live as projections, underlying them with electronic music he arranges as a DJ, usually dubstep or old school electronica. Since 2021 he's processing various templates into GIFs in large numbers. In an interview with IDG magazine Digital Arts Karborn labeled himself a multi-disciplinary designer and his art as "adaptive" in so far as he would accept a process of constant evolution of his art.

== Reception ==
US culture magazine XLR8R called Karborn's works "beautiful multimedia craft" that comes "together in perfect, symbiotic unison". British style magazine Dazed sees the "dubstep- and bassbin-fuelled visual artist" as a representative of "London urbanism" pursuing "urban beautification". British emerging artists magazine NeverLazy named his art pieces "detailed and dynamic mixed media work" that combine "complex digital processes with organic elements". Design magazine We and the Color adjudged that Karborn "combines organic elements with digital editing processes" creating a "distorted, mostly surreal world" in which "digital as well as organic shapes interact with intentional interference". British design magazine It's Nice That adjudged that Karborns works formed "a searing, bewitching whole" and drew comparisons to early video experiments of experimental band Psychic TV. Spanish lifestyle magazine Le cool explained that Karborn "merges fine art techniques with cutting edge technology to brilliant effect".
