= Underpass (song) =

Single by John Foxx

from the album Metamatic
- B-side: "Film One"
- Released: 4 January 1980
- Recorded: Pathway, London, September 1979
- Genre: Synth-pop
- Length: 3:21
- Label: Virgin Metal Beat VS 318
- Songwriter: John Foxx
- Producer: John Foxx

John Foxx singles chronology
"Underpass" (1980)	"No-One Driving" (1980)

"Underpass" is a song by UK artist John Foxx, and was released as a single on 4 January 1980. It was the artist's first solo single release after leaving the band Ultravox and the first single release from the Metamatic album, which was released two weeks later.

The song features music made using synthesisers and electronic percussion only, and the vocal in the verses is delivered in a cold robotic style by Foxx, with an anthemic single word chorus. The lyrics feature Ballardian themes such as memory, architecture, dystopia and cars. There are no great differences in length or content between the album and single version, although an extended version did emerge years later and was used as the opening track on the Metatronic compilation album in 2010.

The single reached no. 31 in the UK charts and was performed by Foxx with three keyboard players on UK music show Top of the Pops. A promotional video for the song was also made.

"Underpass" is featured on all John Foxx's compilation albums Assembly (1992), Modern Art - The Best of John Foxx (2001), Glimmer - Best of John Foxx (2008) and Metatronic (2010). The latter features the extended version and a new remix by Mark Reeder.

== Single release track listings ==
7" single disc VS-318

1. "Underpass"
2. "Film One"

=== Film One ===
The B side of the "Underpass" single is given as "Film 1" on the sleeve but as "Film One" on the label. The track did not feature on the Metamatic album but was included on later CD re-releases of the album in 1993 (track 12), 2001 (track 11) and 2010 (disc 2, track 1). It is an instrumental and was used by Alex Proyas as the soundtrack to his short film Parallel Lives featured during a live performance of John Foxx And The Maths at The Roundhouse in London in 2010. "Film One" was also used as introduction music during the live performance of "Metamatic" performed by John Foxx and Louis Gordon in 2007, as documented on the live album A New Kind Of Man (2008).

=== 12-inch promo ===
A 12-inch only promo disc for "Underpass" was also produced with cat no. VDJ 31. The version of "Underpass" is a standard 3:46 edit, although the B side was the Metamatic track "He's A Liquid", although a different mix from the album version. This version resurfaced much later on the 2001 compilation album Modern Art and on the 2007 "definitive" re-issue of Metamatic, listed as an "alternative version".

== Overpass ==
Foxx repurposed and re-styled the song during his live shows with Louis Gordon in 1997 giving it the new title of "Overpass". The song takes the lyric of the original verses although the single word "underpass!" in the chorus is replaced by "overpass!". The track can be heard on the live EP Exotour (1997), also released on CD as The Omnidelic Exotour and Retro Future (2007, recorded live in Shrewsbury, 1998). In the sleevnotes to The Omnidelic Exotour CD, Foxx writes for "Overpass": "This was the original title. How I felt when I came back from the war." Foxx and Gordon later reverted to playing the "standard" version of "Underpass" live, as documented on Live from a Room (As Big as a City) (2006).

== Remixes ==
=== Mark Reeder ===
The track was remixed by Mark Reeder as a bonus track on the John Foxx retrospective Metatronic compilation album. Three different remixes were issued as mp3 download only

1. Underpass (Mark Reeder's Sinister Subway Radio Remix) (4:07)
2. Underpass (Mark Reeder's Sinister Subway Remix) (6:24)
3. Underpass (Mark Reeder's Dark, Long And Sinister Remix) (10:05)

The remixes feature additional bass guitar played by Reeder himself. "Underpass (Mark Reeder's Sinister Subway Remix Edit)" (4:08) was issued on Reeder's 2011 5.1 Dolby Digital Surround remix DVD

=== 2013 vinyl issue ===
A special limited-edition 12-inch vinyl-only issue featuring two new remixes of "Underpass" was announced for released on Record Store Day, 20 April 2013. The release was, however, delayed and was eventually released on 27 May 2013. This special 12-inch single is limited to 500 numbered copies worldwide, and features new artwork created by Jonathan Barnbrook.

Side A. "Underpass (_Unsubscribe_ Remake Mix)" (by Dave Clarke and Mr Jones)
Side AA. "Underpass (Oh the Gilt Mix)" (by John Tatlock and John Doran)

The "Oh the Gilt Mix" was played for the first time by John Doran on the BBC 6 Music programme Now Playing in September 2012. Doran described the tracks as being "Like J G Ballard with a disco ball". The remix is featured in The Quietus in April 2013 and published on The Quietus' SoundCloud page.

As of May 2013 there were no plans to make the two mixes of "Underpass" featured on this release available elsewhere, except on the CD which was included as part of the VIP Packages for John Foxx and the Maths live shows in April, May and June 2013.

== Promo video ==
A promotional video for "Underpass" was produced by Virgin at the time of the single release. It featured Foxx dressed in suit, tie and overcoat roaming a post-apocalyptic basement with neon light tubes, two keyboard players and two abandoned young children while a black and white film is being projected onto a suspended screen. The film of Foxx roaming the basement miming the lyrics to the song is interspersed with a mysterious telephone receiver dangling in a park and footage of underpasses, overpasses and urban highways. A revised 'black and white' version of the video was included on the DVD of the Metatronic compilation album (2010).

A revised version was also made by Karborn for the same DVD to accompany "Mark Reeder’s Sinister Subway Mix". This digitally restored version also contains footage from the promo video for the successive John Foxx single "No-One Driving" (1980).

A live version of "Underpass" performed by John Foxx and the Maths is included on the Analogue Circuit DVD (2013) and shows specially prepared video footage and imagery by Jonathan Barnbrook.

== Sources and further reading ==
- Metamatic - the official John Foxx website (discography section)
- Quiet City - the music of John Foxx (discography section)
- Underpass at discogs.com
- Metamatic album at discogs.com
- John Foxx Metamatic official youtube channel
