= The Luminaire =

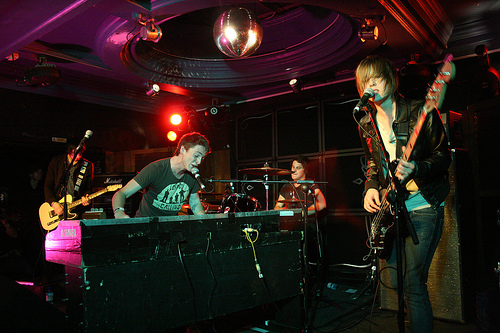
- Air Traffic at the Luminaire in 2007
- Interactive map of The Luminaire
- Address: 311 Kilburn High Rd; London; United Kingdom
- Coordinates: 51.5442°N 0.2010°W

Construction
- Opened: 2005
- Closed: 2011

The Luminaire was a live music venue on Kilburn High Road in north west London, UK. It opened on 1 March 2005 in what was a nightclub called Late, above McGovern's Pub and The Kilburn Bar. Its last public show was 9 March 2011. Student apartments now occupy the space.

It was co-founded by John Donnelly, a publican and property developer from Ireland, and Andy Inglis, a Scot and artist manager.

The venue name was inspired by a bar called Lit on the Lower East Side of Manhattan in New York City. It was voted as Time Out Magazine's London Venue of The Year in 2006 and as Music Week's UK Venue of The Year in 2007, primarily because of its positive attitude to both artist and audience.

In a newsletter in November 2010, The Luminaire announced their closure saying that "It's been a labour of love for a while now, and at this point it makes no sense for us to continue."
