= In Mysterious Ways =

Studio album by John Foxx
- Released: 23 September 1985
- Recorded: 1985
- Studio: The Garden (London)
- Length: 43:25
- Label: Virgin
- Producer: John Foxx

John Foxx chronology
The Golden Section (1983)	In Mysterious Ways (1985)	Assembly (1992)

Singles from In Mysterious Ways
- 1. "Stars on Fire" Released: 24 June 1985; 2. "Enter the Angel" Released: 9 September 1985

Professional ratings
Review scores
Source	Rating
AllMusic	2.5/5 stars

In Mysterious Ways is a 1985 album by John Foxx, the follow-up to his album The Golden Section, released two years previously. It features some of the highly romantic style similar to 1981's The Garden album. Largely missing from this recording are many of the styles Foxx was known for (such as glam inspired art rock, punk and minimal synthpop) in favor of a more soulful, contemporary pop sound.

The lyrics are of discovery and rediscovery and there is much vibrato-laden organ-playing on this record. There are acoustic guitars, mid-1980s home studio-sounding rhythm machines, live drums and glimpses of Cathedral Oceans -style ambient music in places—particularly in the "Enter the Angel" reprise. Although Cathedral Oceans was not released until 12 years later, Foxx has stated he started working on the material as early as 1983.

The cover art is in the collage style he had been presenting to his public since the early Ultravox! days. An expanded edition was released on 27 August 2001 and a "Deluxe 2 CD Edition" on 6 October 2008. Both of these CD reissues have different track running-orders from the original releases.

== Original track listing ==
1. "Stars on Fire" – 5:35
2. "Lose All Sense of Time" – 4:18
3. "Shine On" – 4:41
4. "Enter the Angel" – 3:58
5. "In Mysterious Ways" – 3:06
6. "What Kind of Girl" – 5:03
7. "This Side of Paradise" – 4:38
8. "Stepping Softly" – 3:59
9. "Enter the Angel II" – 2:16
10. "Morning Glory" – 5:54

=== 2001 reissue track listing ===
1. "Stars on Fire" – 5:34
2. "Lose All Sense of Time" – 4:18
3. "What Kind of a Girl" – 5:03
4. "Shine On" – 4:41
5. "Enter the Angel" – 3:58
6. "In Mysterious Ways" – 3:06
7. "This Side of Paradise" – 4:38
8. "Stepping Softly" – 3:58
9. "Morning Glory" – 5:54
10. "Enter the Angel II" – 2:16

==== Bonus tracks ====
11. "Lumen de Lumine" – 2:31
12. "Hiding in Plain Sight" – 5:52
13. "City of Light" – 3:38

=== 2008 'deluxe edition' track listing ===
==== Disc 1 ====
1. "Stars on Fire" – 5:37
2. "Lose All Sense of Time" – 4:21
3. "Spin Away" – 6:43
4. "Shine On" – 4:44
5. "Enter the Angel" – 3:59
6. "In Mysterious Ways" – 3:06
7. "What Kind of a Girl" – 5:06
8. "Stepping Softly" – 3:59
9. "Enter the Angel II" – 2:16
10. "Morning Glory" – 5:54

==== Disc 2 ====
1. "This Side of Paradise" – 4:39
2. "Enter the Angel" (alternative version) – 3:38
3. "To Be with You" (alternative version) – 4:41
4. "And the Sky" – 4:34
5. "Magic" – 3:35
6. "Hiding in Plain Sight" – 5:51
7. "Shine On" (alternative version) – 5:03
8. "City of Light" – 3:37
9. "Lumen de Lumine" – 2:36

==== Notes ====
- "This Side of Paradise" was removed from the album proper for this reissue but included on the bonus disc. No explanation for this is given in the sleeve notes.
- "Spin Away" did not feature on earlier releases of the album.
- An earlier version of "To Be With You" can be found on the deluxe edition of Metamatic.
- "Hiding in Plain Sight" was originally titled "Stairway".

== Personnel ==
- Robin Simon - guitar
- Paul "Wix" Wickens - drums
- Randy Hope-Taylor - bass
- John Foxx - vocals, keyboards, guitar (listed on several tracks as "all other instruments")
- Sadenia Reader - backing vocals
- Peter Oxendale - keyboards
- David Levy - bass
- Barry Watts - drums
