= Benge =

Benge is the 'Poison Oracle' used by the Azande of Central Africa, mainly in Southern Sudan, in which a decision is determined by whether or not a fowl survives being administered a poison. The outcome of the oracle can be taken as law in certain circumstances when a Zande Chief is present. The practice is increasingly rare since colonial times.

The Azande Tribe believed that witchcraft was inherited and grew with age. To tribe members, everyday ailments or events could be explained by witchcraft. If someone was ill, they would go to an oracle who would feed poison to a chicken. If the chicken died after the name of a certain tribe member was called, then that person was considered the witch. Azande believed people could be witches without knowing it, and once the tribe member learned he or she was a witch they would stop unknowingly cursing the other members of their tribe with bad thoughts.
