= Gazelle Twin =

British composer, producer and musician

- Born: Elizabeth Walling; 1981 (age 44–45)
- Origin: Brighton, England
- Genres: Electronic; avant-pop; industrial
- Instruments: Vocals; laptop
- Years active: 2009–present
- Labels: Lakeshore Records (US); Invada Records (UK); Last Gang Records (US/Canada); Moog Music Library (US); The Vinyl Factory (UK); NMC Recordings (UK); Sugarcane Recordings; Anti-Ghost Moon Ray
- Website: gazelletwin.com

Elizabeth Bernholz (née Walling, born 1981), better known by her stage name Gazelle Twin, is an electronic music composer, producer and musician who is currently based in Leicestershire, England.

== Life and career ==
Elizabeth Bernholz studied music at the University of Sussex and graduated in 2006. She conceived the Gazelle Twin project when she watched Fever Ray perform at the 2009 Loop Festival. Bernholz noted how "[Fever Ray's] show reminded me how powerful and liberating costume is, and I became interested in the power of disguise".

The debut album, The Entire City, was released in July 2011 to critical acclaim. The album includes her three previously recorded singles, "Changelings" (2010), "I Am Shell I Am Bone" and "Men Like Gods" (2011). Bernholz named it as her "landscape album".

In 2014, Gazelle Twin released her second album, Unflesh, to further critical praise. In an interview with Guy Mankowski for PopMatters, Bernholz mentioned that in the live shows for Unflesh she would be performing in a version of her PE kit from school, saying she wanted to "go back to my teenage years to literally live out the idea of being a freak, like I thought I was (and was often made to feel) at the time."

On 21 September 2018, Bernholz released her third studio album, Pastoral, preceded by two singles: "Hobby Horse" and "Glory". The album's main inspirations were rural life and Brexit. It ranked at number one on The Quietus' "Top 100 Albums of 2018" list. She has also remixed music by John Foxx.

Gazelle Twin is unsigned and releases music under her own label, Anti-Ghost Moon Ray, but has also released music on Lakeshore Records (US), Invada Records (UK), Last Gang Records (US/CAN), Moog Music Library (US), The Vinyl Factory (UK), NMC Recordings (UK), and Sugarcane Recordings (US).

== Personal life ==
Elizabeth Bernholz lives in Leicestershire, England with her husband, Jez Bernholz, who also performs with her on stage, and her child whose name is Ezra. She previously lived in Brighton for 12 years.

== Discography ==
=== Albums ===
Title	Details
The Entire City	Released: 11 July 2011; Label: Anti-Moon Ghost Ray; Formats: CD, LP, digital download
Unflesh	Released: 22 September 2014; Label: Anti-Moon Ghost Ray; Formats: CD, LP, digital download
Pastoral	Released: 21 September 2018; Label: Anti-Moon Ghost Ray; Formats: CD, LP, digital download
Deep England (with NYX)	Released: 19 March 2021; Label: NYX Collective Records; Formats: CD, vinyl, digital download
Black Dog	Released: 27 October 2023; Label: Invada Records; Formats: CD, vinyl, digital download

=== EPs ===
Title	Details
Mammal	Released: 28 January 2013; Label: Sugarcane; Formats: LP, digital download
Kingdom Come	Released: 17 November 2017; Label: Anti-Moon Ghost Ray; Formats: Digital download

=== Remix albums ===
Title	Details
The Entire City Remixed	Released: 4 June 2012; Label: Anti-Moon Ghost Ray; Formats: Digital download
Fleshed Out	Released: 29 July 2016; Label: Anti-Moon Ghost Ray; Formats: LP, digital download
Shadow Dogs	Released: 6 December 2024; Label: Invada Records UK; Formats: LP, digital download

=== Soundtrack albums ===
Title	Details
Out of Body (Soundtrack)	Released: 18 March 2016; Label: Anti-Moon Ghost Ray; Formats: Digital download
Welcome to the Blumhouse: Nocturne (Amazon Original Soundtrack	Released: 15 December 2020; Formats: Digital download, vinyl
Cyberpunk 2077: Radio, Vol. 3 (Original Soundtrack)	Released: 25 December 2020; Label: Lakeshore Records; Formats: Digital download, vinyl
The Power (Original Motion Picture Soundtrack)	Released: 8 March 2021; Label: Invada Records; Formats: Digital download
Then You Run (Original Score)	Released: 7 July 2023; Label: Invada Records; Formats: Digital download, vinyl

=== Singles ===
Title	Year	Album
"Changelings"	2010	The Entire City
"I Am Shell I Am Bone"	2011	The Entire City
"Men Like Gods"	2011	The Entire City
"Belly of the Beast"	2014	Unflesh
"Anti Body"	2014	Unflesh
"Guts"	2014	Unflesh
"Human Touch"	2014	Unflesh
"Hobby Horse"	2018	Pastoral
"Glory"	2018	Pastoral
"Dirge MMXVIII"	2018	Non-album single
"Fool"	2019	Non-album single
"Fire Leap"	2020	Deep England
"Deep England"	2021	Deep England
"Black Dog"	2023	Black Dog
"Fear Keeps Us Alive"	2023	Black Dog

=== Remixes ===
- Halsey - I am not a woman, I'm a god (Gazelle Twin Remix)
