= No-One Driving =

Single by John Foxx

from the album Metamatic
- B-side: "Glimmer" / "This City" / "Mr. No"
- Released: 21 March 1980
- Recorded: Pathway, London, 1979
- Genre: New wave, synthpop
- Length: 3:46
- Label: Virgin Metal Beat VS 338
- Songwriter: John Foxx
- Producer: John Foxx

John Foxx singles chronology
"Underpass" (1980)	"No-One Driving" (1980)	"Burning Car" (1980)

"No-One Driving" is a 1980 song by UK artist John Foxx, and was released as a single on 21 March 1980. It was the second single release from the Metamatic album, after "Underpass". The song is typical of Foxx's musical output of the time, featuring a Ballardian dystopian scenario involving an automobile in the lyrics, with music produced using electronic instruments (synthesisers, drum machines, electronic percussion) only.

The single was released as a limited edition double 7" disc with three accompanying tracks, and as a single 7" both as two track and three track discs with the same catalogue number. The re-recorded single version is slightly different from the album version in sound mix and lyrics; the line "..someone's gone liquid in the sheets.." on the original (album) version is replaced by "..someone's gone missing in the sheets..".

The record entered the UK Singles Chart at no. 32, remaining at the same position for a further week before dropping down. This was the final single release from Metamatic.

The single version is featured on the John Foxx compilation albums Modern Art – The Best of John Foxx (2001) and Glimmer – Best of John Foxx (2008). The latter also includes an "early version" of "No-One Driving". Live versions of the song are also included on the albums: Live From A Room (As Big As A City) (2006) and A New Kind of Man (2008).

The song remains a John Foxx standard and one of his best known songs and is performed live to this day, as John Foxx and the Maths. In 2025 Foxx released a vinyl only compilation album, also entitled No-One Driving, bringing together the single version of the title track and previous single Underpass, as well as B-sides and other tracks from 1980.

== Single release track listings ==
7" single disc (two track version)

1. "No-One Driving"
2. "Glimmer"

7" single disc (three track version)

1. "No-One Driving"
2. "Glimmer"
3. "Mr. No"

7" double disc (gatefold sleeve)

1. "No-One Driving"
2. "Glimmer"
3. "This City"
4. "Mr. No"

7" German release (different sleeve artwork)

1. "No-One Driving"
2. "Metal Beat"

7" promo double disc cat. no. VS 338 A5 DJ (gatefold sleeve with sticker)

1. "No-One Driving" (2.53 edit)
2. "Glimmer"
3. "This City"
4. "Mr. No"

"This City" features on the compilation albums "Assembly" and "Metatronic", while "Glimmer" appears on the eponymous compilation album. All three B-sides were released together for the first time on the 2001 CD re-issue of the Metamatic album, and later on the 2007 re-issue.

== Promo video ==
The promo video is slightly shorter than the single version at 2:53, with the second verse and chorus edited out. It features Foxx dressed in the typical grey suit jerkily dancing and miming to the song, accompanied in some scenes by two keyboard players. The video was included on the Metatronic DVD although does not feature on John Foxx's official YouTube page. Parts of the video were however used for the 2010 "Underpass" video edit by KARBORN, which is featured.

== Sources and further reading ==
- Metamatic – the official John Foxx website (discography section)
- Quiet City - the music of John Foxx (discography section)
- No-One Driving at discogs.com
- Metamatic album at discogs.com
- John Foxx Metamatic official's channel on YouTube
