= Cathedral Oceans =

Studio album by John Foxx
- Released: 24 March 1997
- Recorded: 1983–1997
- Studio: The Garden (London); C.Y.H. (Manchester); Piano, (Rome)
- Genre: Ambient
- Length: 53:01
- Label: Metamatic Records
- Producer: John Foxx

John Foxx chronology
Assembly (1985)	Cathedral Oceans (1997)	Shifting City (1997)

Professional ratings
Review scores
Source	Rating
Allmusic	4/5 stars

Cathedral Oceans (after 2003 also referred to as Cathedral Oceans I) is an album of ambient music by John Foxx, released on 24 March 1997. Alongside Shifting City released on the same date, it marked Foxx's return to the music scene after an absence of seven years. It was also his first solo album since 1985's In Mysterious Ways. The album's artwork consists of collages by Foxx himself, overlaying various pictures and textures with the faces of statues.

Cathedral Oceans is a long ongoing project by Foxx; the first recordings that appear on this album were made as early 1983. In 1987 Cathedral Oceans material was played live by Foxx in various buildings, gardens and cathedrals in England and Rome. As a result of the long genesis of the album it does sound somewhat fragmented in places, but the overall effect is soothing, almost pastoral ambience created by extensive usage of reverb and echo coupled with Gregorian chanting. The sound of this album is far removed from the steely, detached cityscapes Foxx is best known for, but it does bear resemblance to tracks such as "The Garden" from the album with the same name and "Enter The Angel II" from In Mysterious Ways. "Sunset Rising" was included on Foxx's 2001 compilation album Modern Art.

Cathedral Oceans (now called Cathedral Oceans I) was released on 2 June 2003 as a two-disc set with Cathedral Oceans II. A third album in the series, Cathedral Oceans III, followed on 8 August 2005.

On 25 October 2010 all three albums were reissued as The Complete Cathedral Oceans, a 3CD set including a DVD of Cathedral Oceans III, and on 2 September 2016 released on five 12-inch vinyl records in a hardback album book set. The book contained a selection of Foxx’s images along with passages from his book “The Quiet Man”. A 12x12 frameable print of one of the images was also included.

== Track listing ==
1. "Cathedral Oceans" - 5:17
2. "City as Memory" - 5:43
3. "Through Summer Rooms" - 6:35
4. "Geometry and Coincidence" - 5:24
5. "If Only..." - 3:21
6. "Shifting Perspective" - 2:33
7. "Floating Islands" - 6:07
8. "Infinite in All Directions" - 5:50
9. "Avenham Collonade" - 6:12
10. "Sunset Rising" - 2:37
11. "Invisible Architecture" - 3:22
- All tracks written by John Foxx, except "City as Memory" and "Sunset Rising" by John Foxx and Peter Griffiths, and "Infinite in All Directions" by John Foxx and Louis Gordon.

== Personnel ==
- John Foxx – Guitar, Vocals, Producer, Engineer, Images
- Peter Griffiths – Engineer
- Andy Robinson – Digital Editing
- Chris Thorpe – Digital Mastering, Assembly
- Mick Williams – Engineer
