= The Garden (John Foxx album) =

Studio album by John Foxx
- Released: 25 September 1981
- Recorded: The Garden, London 1981
- Studio: The Garden (London)
- Genre: New wave, synthpop
- Length: 41:18
- Label: Virgin
- Producer: John Foxx

John Foxx chronology
Metamatic (1980)	The Garden (1981)	The Golden Section (1983)

Singles from The Garden
- 1. "Europe After the Rain" Released: 21 August 1981; 2. "Dancing Like a Gun" Released: 30 October 1981

Professional ratings
Review scores
Source	Rating
Allmusic	4/5 stars
Smash Hits	5/10

The Garden is the second studio album by English musician John Foxx, released on 25 September 1981 by Virgin Records. The follow-up to his debut solo album Metamatic (1980), by comparison, it features more diverse instrumentation, the use of non electronic instrumentation, and romantic stylings.

The album spent six weeks in the UK Albums charts in 1981, peaking at number 24. It was supported by two singles "Europe After the Rain", released on 21 August 1981, and "Dancing Like a Gun", released on 30 October 1981.

== Production and style ==
The sound and subject matter of The Garden were informed by a number of factors: with Foxx's Catholic upbringing and early exposure to Latin mass and Gregorian chant and his exploration of England's countryside, architecture and history following the release of Metamatic. The song "Systems of Romance", which had been written during sessions for the Ultravox album of the same name but was not included on the record, even though its title was used.

Another connection between The Garden and Systems of Romance the album was the presence of guitarist Robin Simon, whose textured style had been a significant influence on the sound of the earlier release. Whereas on Metamatic the only conventional instrument had been bass guitar, Foxx used a full band of musicians on The Garden to play electric and acoustic guitar, electric bass, piano, and acoustic percussion, in addition to synthesizers and drum machines.

Regarding the album's title and the influence of his travels through England, in a 1981 interview with Bruce Elder on Australian radio Triple J, Foxx said, "'The Garden' seemed to be a pretty good metaphor because I found a lot of gardens that were overgrown and ruined and a lot of very grand buildings that were almost decaying - but I found them a lot more beautiful than they were in their original state, being overgrown".

The opening track, "Europe After the Rain", encapsulated the style of the album as a whole, featuring discreet synthesizer work in concert with piano, acoustic guitar and a digital drum machine; its title came from a Max Ernst painting. The tune of "Night Suit" betrayed a funk influence, whilst its lyrics were among many on the album that alluded to 'The Quiet Man', an alternative persona Foxx had developed prior to Ultravox's Systems of Romance and which inspired one of its key songs, "Quiet Men". Foxx saw The Quiet Man as the epitome of detachment and observation, and claimed to often write from his perspective.

Two songs that reflected the influence of church music and prayer were "Pater Noster" and the title track. The former was played entirely by Foxx, the Lord's Prayer sung in Latin against an electronic disco beat and the composer’s 'Human Host', a collection of tapes, vocoders and synthesizer sounds. The latter was a manifestation of the inspiration Foxx took from rural England and cathedral architecture; musically it also bore some resemblance to the final track on Systems of Romance, "Just for a Moment".

== Release and aftermath ==
Initial vinyl copies included a glossy booklet called "Church", with words and photographs by Foxx. "Europe After the Rain" b/w "This Jungle" (plus "You Were There" on 12-inch) was released on 21 August 1981 as the first single, a month prior to the album, making #40. "Dancing Like a Gun" b/w "Swimmer 2" (plus "Swimmer 1" on 12-inch) followed on 30 October 1981 but did not chart. The album was re-released on CD with extra tracks on 19 April 1993. The non-album B-sides appear on the 30 July 2001 reissue of The Garden, and again as a "Deluxe 2 CD Edition" on 6 October 2008. The album, particularly its title track, is generally cited as having influenced Foxx's later ambient output, Cathedral Oceans (1995) and its sequel Cathedral Oceans II (2003).

== Track listing ==
All songs written by John Foxx.

1. "Europe After the Rain" – 3:57
2. "Systems of Romance" – 4:02
3. "When I Was a Man and You Were a Woman" – 3:37
4. "Dancing Like a Gun" – 4:10
5. "Pater Noster" – 2:32
6. "Night Suit" – 4:26
7. "You Were There" – 3:51
8. "Fusion/Fission" – 3:48
9. "Walk Away" – 3:52
10. "The Garden" – 7:03

=== 1993 reissue bonus tracks ===
11. "Young Man" – 2:53
12. "Dance With Me" – 3:29
13. "A Woman on a Stairway" – 4:29
14. "The Lifting Sky" – 4:48
15. "Annexe" – 3:10
16. "Wings and a Wind" – 5:15
- Most of these bonus tracks date from The Golden Section sessions, an album which was not reissued in 1993, explaining the juggling of bonus tracks for the 2001 reissue series.

=== 2001 reissue bonus tracks ===
11. "A Long Time" – 3:49
12. "This Jungle" – 4:41
13. "Swimmer 2" – 3:31 (effectively "Swimmer 1")
14. "Swimmer 1" – 5:10 (effectively "Swimmer 2")
15. "Young Man" – 2:53

=== 2008 reissue bonus disc ===
1. "Swimmer II"
2. "This Jungle"
3. "Miles Away"
4. "A Long Time"
5. "Swimmer I"
6. "Fog"
7. "Swimmer III"
8. "Swimmer IV"
9. "Dance With Me" (early version)
10. "A Woman on a Stairway" (early version)
11. "Fusion/Fission" (early version)
12. "Miles Away" (alternative version)

== Personnel ==
- Duncan Bridgeman – synthesizer, bass, percussion, bongos, cymbals, tom-toms, sequencer, brass, piano, the Human Host
- Jake Durant – bass
- Jo Dworniak – bass
- John Foxx – synthesizer, piano, guitar, vocals, drum programming, tom-toms, the Human Host
- Gareth Jones – percussion
- Philip Roberts – drums
- Robin Simon – guitar
