= The Golden Section =

Studio album by John Foxx
- Released: 26 September 1983
- Recorded: 1983
- Studio: The Garden (London)
- Genres: New wave, synthpop, psychedelic rock
- Length: 44:49
- Label: Virgin
- Producers: Zeus B. Held, John Foxx

John Foxx chronology
The Garden (1981)	The Golden Section (1983)	In Mysterious Ways (1985)

Singles from The Golden Section
- 1. "Endlessly" Released: 17 June 1983; 2. "Your Dress" Released: 22 August 1983; 3. "Like a Miracle" Released: 24 October 1983

Professional ratings
Review scores
Source	Rating
Allmusic	4/5 stars

The Golden Section is a 1983 album by English musician John Foxx. A progression from the sound of The Garden (1981), Foxx called The Golden Section "a roots check: Beatles, Church music, Psychedelia, The Shadows, The Floyd, The Velvets, Roy Orbison, Kraftwerk, and cheap pre-electro Europop". The album was Foxx's first work with a producer since his final Ultravox album, Systems of Romance, in 1978; The Golden Section was co-produced by Zeus B. Held, well known in the Krautrock scene of the 1970s. In addition to Foxx's wide array of synthesizers, the production made extensive use of vocoder effects and sampling, along with traditional rock guitar.

== Production and style ==
Foxx's two previous solo albums, Metamatic (1980) and The Garden (1981), had included a number of compositions written for earlier projects but shelved for one reason or another, such as "He's a Liquid" and "Touch and Go", originally performed live with Ultravox, and "Systems of Romance" and "Walk Away", written during sessions for the album Systems of Romance. In contrast, The Golden Section was almost wholly made up of material written especially for the album in 1983, the exceptions being "Like a Miracle", an earlier version of which was recorded during the Metamatic sessions and released on the deluxe edition of that album, and "Endlessly", an early version of which Foxx had released as a single on 16 July 1982. Another eight songs he recorded around the same time as "Endlessly", that were to have formed an album, were scrapped.

The album's psychedelic rock flavour was evident on tracks like "Someone" and "Endlessly". The latter was described by Trouser Press as "the album's clear standout, a magnificent multi-level pop creation". "Ghosts on Water" opened with vocal samples from the embers of "Endlessly", the preceding track on the album. It utilised sitar, backwards cymbals, a shehnai, and a reversed string arrangement at the end, set to an adaptation of The Beatles' "Tomorrow Never Knows" drum pattern.

"Sitting at the Edge of the World" evoked sounds from "Strawberry Fields Forever", whilst "Running Across Thin Ice With Tigers" utilised Beatlesque harmonies and the sound of a tiger's roar. The final track, "Twilight's Last Gleaming", shared its title with a 1977 World War III film, a William S. Burroughs short story, and a phrase from "The Star-Spangled Banner", though it did not overtly reference any of them.

== Release and aftermath ==
The Golden Section spent three weeks in the UK charts, peaking at #27. An earlier version of "Endlessly" had been released as a non-album single on 16 July 1982 and did not chart, while an edit of the subsequent album version, released as the first single from the album on 24 June 1983, made #66 in the UK (a 12-inch single was released on 1 July 1983). "Your Dress" was released as a second single on 22 August 1983, reaching #61. The album's third and final single, "Like a Miracle", was released on 24 October 1983, but did not chart. Foxx embarked on a tour to promote the album in late 1983, and live recordings from the Dominion and Lyceum Theatres in London were released in 2002 as part of the double concert CD The Golden Section Tour + The Omnidelic Exotour.

== Re-releases ==
The Golden Section was re-released on CD with bonus tracks on 27 August 2001 and as a "Deluxe 2 CD Edition" on 6 October 2008, including a sixteen-page booklet containing song lyrics and new artwork. The second CD featured B-sides and eight previously unreleased tracks.

A 40th-anniversary clear vinyl edition of the original album, plus a new collection of B-sides, on red vinyl, entitled Annexe, was released on 28 July 2023.

== Track listing ==
All songs written by John Foxx.

1. "My Wild Love" – 3:45
2. "Someone" – 3:30
3. "Your Dress" – 4:26
4. "Running Across Thin Ice With Tigers" – 5:37
5. "Sitting at the Edge of the World" – 4:23
6. "Endlessly" – 4:18
7. "Ghosts on Water" – 3:12
8. "Like a Miracle" – 5:10
9. "The Hidden Man" – 5:44
10. "Twilight's Last Gleaming" – 4:24 Produced by Mike Howlett

=== 2001 reissue bonus tracks ===
11. "Dance With Me" – 3:29
12. "The Lifting Sky" – 4:48
13. "Annexe" – 3:10
14. "Wings and a Wind" – 5:15
15. "A Kind of Wave" – 3:37
16. "A Woman on a Stairway" – 4:29

=== 2008 reissue bonus disc ===
1. "Endlessly" (single version) – 3:52
2. "My Wild Love" (early version) – 2:48
3. "A Long Time" (alternative version) – 5:04
4. "Annexe" – 3:10
5. "Sitting at the Edge of the World" (alternative version) – 3:59
6. "A Kind of Wave" – 3:38
7. "Twilight's Last Gleaming" (early version) – 3:51
8. "Running Across Thin Ice With Tigers" (extended mix) – 5:50
9. "A Woman on a Stairway" – 4:26
10. "The Lifting Sky" – 4:50
11. "Shine on Me" – 3:46
12. "Young Man" – 2:56
13. "Wings and a Wind" – 5:17
14. "The Hidden Man" (alternative version) – 4:41
15. "Dance With Me" – 3:30
16. "Endlessly" (alternative extended mix) – 6:03
- The extended mix of "Endlessly" is a different one to that released on the "Endlessly" 12-inch single prior to the album's release.

=== Annexe (2023 red vinyl) ===
Side One

1. Endlessly (Single Version)
2. Young Man
3. Dance With Me
4. My Wild Love (Early Version)
5. Wings And A Wind

Side Two

1. Annexe
2. A Kind Of Wave
3. The Lifting Sky
4. Shine On Me
5. A Woman On A Stairway

== Personnel ==
- Kevin Armstrong – guitar
- Blair Cunningham – drums
- Jo Dworniak – bass
- John Foxx – vocals, guitar, keyboards, Magnetic Choir
- Zeus B. Held – keyboards
- Mike Howlett – bass, drums
- J. J. Jeczalik – Fairlight CMI programming
- James Risborough – choirboy
- Robin Simon – guitar
- Paul "Wix" Wickens – drums, keyboards

== See also ==
- Golden ratio
