= Louis Gordon =

- Born: 1965 (age 59–60)
- Origin: Manchester
- Genres: Synthpop, electronic
- Instrument: Keyboards
- Years active: 1973—present
- Labels: Metamatic Records; Toffeetones
- Website: Myspace

Louis Gordon (born 1965) is an English musician notable for his collaboration with John Foxx. He has worked with Foxx on a number of albums since 1995. His solo work has also been released on the Toffeetones record label.

== Biography ==
John Foxx had met Louis Gordon after watching one of his concerts. The concert was at Berrington Hall, near Shrewsbury and was in aid of Gordon's birthday (in January 1995). Gordon was said to be "blown away" by their meeting. He was later contacted by Foxx, who asked about making a record together. Their first recording was made in Manchester.

Gordon began playing the drums as a child, later progressing to bass guitar and guitar. He now predominantly plays keyboards and guitar doing one-man shows with guest appearances by friends.

== Discography ==
=== Solo ===
- Louis Gordon – The Man with No Fame (self-released, 2004)
- Louis Gordon - Closed Gone Fishing (self-released, 2005)
- Louis Gordon – Tell Your Mum I Saved Your Life (self-released, 2006)
- Louis Gordon - Deep Electric Blue (Black Spot, 2006)
- Louis Gordon - Goodbye Walnut Road (Northern Star, 2007)
- Louis Gordon - Blind Anorexic (Toffeetones, 2008)
- Louis Gordon – E.S.T. (Electric Shock Treatment) (Toffeetones, 2009)
- Louis Gordon - The Motion Picture Event of the Year (Toffeetones, 2009)

=== John Foxx & Louis Gordon ===
- Shifting City (1997)
- Exotour 97 (1997)
- Subterranean Omnidelic Exotour (1998)
- The Pleasures of Electricity (2001)
- Crash and Burn (2003)
- Drive EP (2003)
- Live from a Room (As Big as a City) (2006)
- From Trash (2006)
- Sideways (2006)
- Impossible (2008)
- Neuro Video (2008)

=== Gordon & Gunn ===
- Gordon & Gunn - The Shortwave Sessions
