= Metamatic =

Studio album by John Foxx
- Released: 18 January 1980
- Recorded: 1979
- Studio: Pathway, London
- Genre: Synth-pop
- Length: 38:24
- Label: Virgin
- Producer: John Foxx

John Foxx chronology
Metamatic (1980)	The Garden (1981)

Singles from Metamatic
- 1. "Underpass" Released: 4 January 1980; 2. "No-One Driving" Released: 21 March 1980

Professional ratings
Review scores
Source	Rating
AllMusic	4.5/5 stars
Classic Rock	8/10
Mojo	4/5 stars
Q	4/5 stars
Record Mirror	5/5 stars
Smash Hits	7½/10
Uncut	8/10

Metamatic is the debut solo studio album by John Foxx, released on 18 January 1980. It was his first solo project following his split with Ultravox the previous year. A departure from the mix of synthesizers and conventional rock instrumentation on that band's work, Metamatic was purely electronic in sound. The name 'Metamatic' comes from a painting machine by kinetic artist Jean Tinguely, first exhibited at the Paris Biennial in 1959. The album peaked at #18 on the UK Albums Chart.

== Production and style ==
Metamatic was recorded at Pathway Studios, a small eight-track studio in Islington, and was engineered by Gareth Jones. Foxx's electronic equipment included an ARP Odyssey, an Elka 'String Machine' and a Roland CR-78 drum machine. Several of the synth parts were played by John Wesley-Barker. Dub music was an influence on the production.

The lyrics were heavily influenced by the writings of J. G. Ballard. Six of the tracks referenced automobiles or motorways, most obviously "Underpass" and "No-One Driving". (Foxx re-worked the former track as "Overpass" on the live Subterranean Omnidelic Exotour in 1998). The song "A New Kind of Man" is about a man stepping into a film screen, which inspired the cover art of the album. The song "He's a Liquid" was influenced by a still from a Japanese horror film depicting a suit draped across a chair in such a way as to suggest that the wearer had liquified; Foxx's lyrics also alluded to the 'fluidity' of human relationships. The final track, "Touch and Go", included psychedelic aspects.

Although Foxx had performed "He's a Liquid" and "Touch and Go" live with Ultravox before leaving the band in 1979, the band was not credited for them on Metamatic. When Ultravox adapted the tune from "Touch and Go" for the song "Mr. X" on Vienna (1980), their first album following Foxx's departure, Foxx was not credited.

== Release and aftermath ==
Metamatic spent seven weeks in the UK charts, peaking at #18. The album was generally well received by critics and is still cited as his most influential solo release.

=== Singles and reissues ===
"Underpass" was released as an edited single two weeks before the album (length: 3:18), making #31 in the UK charts and appearing on a number of electropop compilations of the time. Its B-side was a non-album instrumental, "Film One". On 21 March 1980 a re-recorded version of "No-One Driving" was released as a double single with three other non-album tracks: "Glimmer", "Mr. No" and "This City", reaching #32.

On 11 July 1980, Foxx released a single with new songs on both sides, "Burning Car" b/w "20th Century", making #35. He issued one more single-only release on 31 October 1980, the transitional "Miles Away" b/w "A Long Time", which provided a foretaste of the more fully produced sound of his next album, The Garden (1981). All these non-album tracks have appeared on various John Foxx compilations and reissues of Metamatic; the 19 April 1993 CD version of the album also included "Young Love", a previously unreleased track recorded in 1979. The album was re-released on CD with extra tracks on 30 July 2001. A "Deluxe 2 CD Edition" reissue of the album was released on 17 September 2007, which was intended to bring together all the Metamatic-era material, plus previously unavailable tracks, onto one bonus CD. Another re-mastered edition was released as a 3CD Deluxe Edition on 30 May 2018. This included fifteen instrumentals on disc three, as the new reissue project grew to forty-nine tracks across three CDs.

Foxx's record label and his official website are also named Metamatic.

=== Metal Beat interview ===
An in-depth interview with Foxx by Steve Malins about the making of Metamatic is the subject of a double-CD album "Metal Beat" released on 29 September 2007. The interview includes extracts from demos of No-One Driving, Touch and Go and Like A Miracle and an extended version of Plaza, together with some early experiments by Foxx with drum machines and analogue synthesisers and tracks retrieved from two 1980 tapes marked "music for film" and "instrumentals". A 30-second piece entitled Jane is also included.

== Critical reception ==
Upon its release in 1980 the album received positive reviews. Record Mirror gave the album a 5 out of 5 rating. Smash Hits wrote that "this restrained and melodic album of synthesised music and (surprise, surprise) futuristic visions comes as an impressive step forward" (from the "chronically pretentious Ultravox").

Trouser Press wrote: "Metamatic is Foxx’s first venture alone into the world of synthesizers (...) In emulation of his own work and Conny Plank’s production on Ultravox’s Systems of Romance, Foxx (aided by another synthesist and a bassist) finds the perfect counterpart for his themes of alienation and dislocation in sterile, minimalist electronic sounds. His vocals are oddly distant, like echoes, but the record has an honesty and directness that are quite affecting."

From retrospective reviews, in a Record Collector review of the 2007 reissue Ian Shirley concluded: "To be frank, however, Metamatic has not worn well. Although the analogue synth textures work well on the singles and tracks such as Plaza, Metal Beat and Touch & Go, the rhythms of the drum machines and overall sound of A New Kind Of Man and Tidal Wave are very dated. Considering how adventurous and warm the Human League’s Reproduction and Travelogue from the same period are, Metamatic is the sound of musical austerity."

The 2018 reissue received a positive review by Kieron Tyler: "Metamatic feels as much about melody as the then-current musical tools. “He’s a Liquid” and “Touch and Go” had been played live by Ultravox so, clearly, Foxx was honing some of the album’s songs before they were recorded; there was pre-planning. There’s also a timelessness, born from to the combination of Foxx’s chops as a songwriter and the use of pre-digital synths which had to be configured manually. The sounds and arrangements Foxx came up with were his own. The only track which has dated is “Metal Beat” due to its borrowings from elements of Kraftwerk's “Showroom Dummies” and “The Robots”. Overall, Metamatic is poppy, romantic, and refracts the aura of concrete-filled urban environments and the power they exert."

== Track listing ==
All tracks written by John Foxx.

1. "Plaza" – 3:52
2. "He's a Liquid" – 2:59
3. "Underpass" – 3:53
4. "Metal Beat" – 2:59
5. "No-One Driving" – 3:45
6. "A New Kind of Man" – 3:38
7. "Blurred Girl" – 4:16
8. "030" – 3:15
9. "Tidal Wave" – 4:14
10. "Touch and Go" – 5:33

=== 1993 reissue bonus tracks ===
1. "Young Love" – 3:10
2. "Film One" – 3:58
3. "20th Century" – 3:06
4. "Miles Away" – 3:17
5. "A Long Time" – 3:49
6. "Swimmer 1" – 4:06

=== 2001 reissue bonus tracks ===
1. "Film One" – 3:58
2. "Glimmer" – 3:33
3. "Mr. No" – 3:14
4. "This City" – 3:03
5. "20th Century" – 3:06
6. "Burning Car" – 3:12
7. "Miles Away" – 3:17

=== 2007 reissue bonus disc ===
1. "Film One"
2. "This City"
3. "To Be With You"
4. "Cinemascope"
5. "Burning Car"
6. "Glimmer"
7. "Mr No"
8. "Young Love"
9. "20th Century"
10. "My Face"
11. "Like a Miracle" (alternative version)
12. "A New Kind of Man" (alternative version)
13. "He's a Liquid" (alternative version)
- "To Be With You" and "Cinemascope" were created by sampling and arranging audio clips from material previously recorded with analogue equipment.

=== 2014 Record Store Day white vinyl reissue ===
Track listing as per the original 1980 vinyl issue but in new gatefold sleeve with artwork featuring rare images and reconstructions. Track Listings Disc: 1 1 Plaza 2 He's a Liquid 3 Underpass 4 Metal Beat 5 No-one Driving 6 A New Kind of Man 7 Blurred Girl 8 030 9 Tidal Wave 10 Touch and Go Disc: 2 1 Film One 2 This City 3 To Be With You 4 Cinemascope 5 Burning Car 6 Glimmer 7 Mr. No 8 Young Love 9 20th Century 10 My Face 11 Underpass (Radio Edit) 12 Non-one Driving (Single Version) 13 Like a Miracle 14 A New Kind of Man 15 He's a Liquid 16 Plaza (Extended Version) 17 Underpass (Extended Version) 18 Blurred Girl (Lounge Fade Version) Disc: 3 1 A Frozen Moment 2 He's a Liquid (Instrumental Dub) 3 Mr. No 4 The Uranium Committee 5 A Man Alone 6 Over Tokyo 7 Terminal Zone 8 Urban Code 9 A Version of You 10 Glimmer 11 Fragmentary City 12 Metamorphosis 13 Approaching the Monument 14 Critical Mass 15 Alamogordo Logic 16 Touch and Go (Early Version) 17 Miss Machinery 18 No-one Driving (Early Version) 19 Burning Car (Early Version) 20 Like a Miracle (Early Version) 21 No-one Driving

== Charts ==
Chart (1980)	Peak position
UK Charts	18
Australian (Kent Music Report)	98

== Personnel ==
- John Foxx – vocals, rhythm machines (mainly Roland CR-78), synthesizers and keyboards
- John Wesley Barker – additional synthesizers and keyboards
- Jake Durant – bass guitar
- Gareth Jones – engineer

Keyboards used on the album include the Minimoog, ARP Odyssey, clavinet, Elka Rhapsody 610, piano, Farfisa string synth, and Hammond organ.
