= John Foxx =

English musician (born 1948)

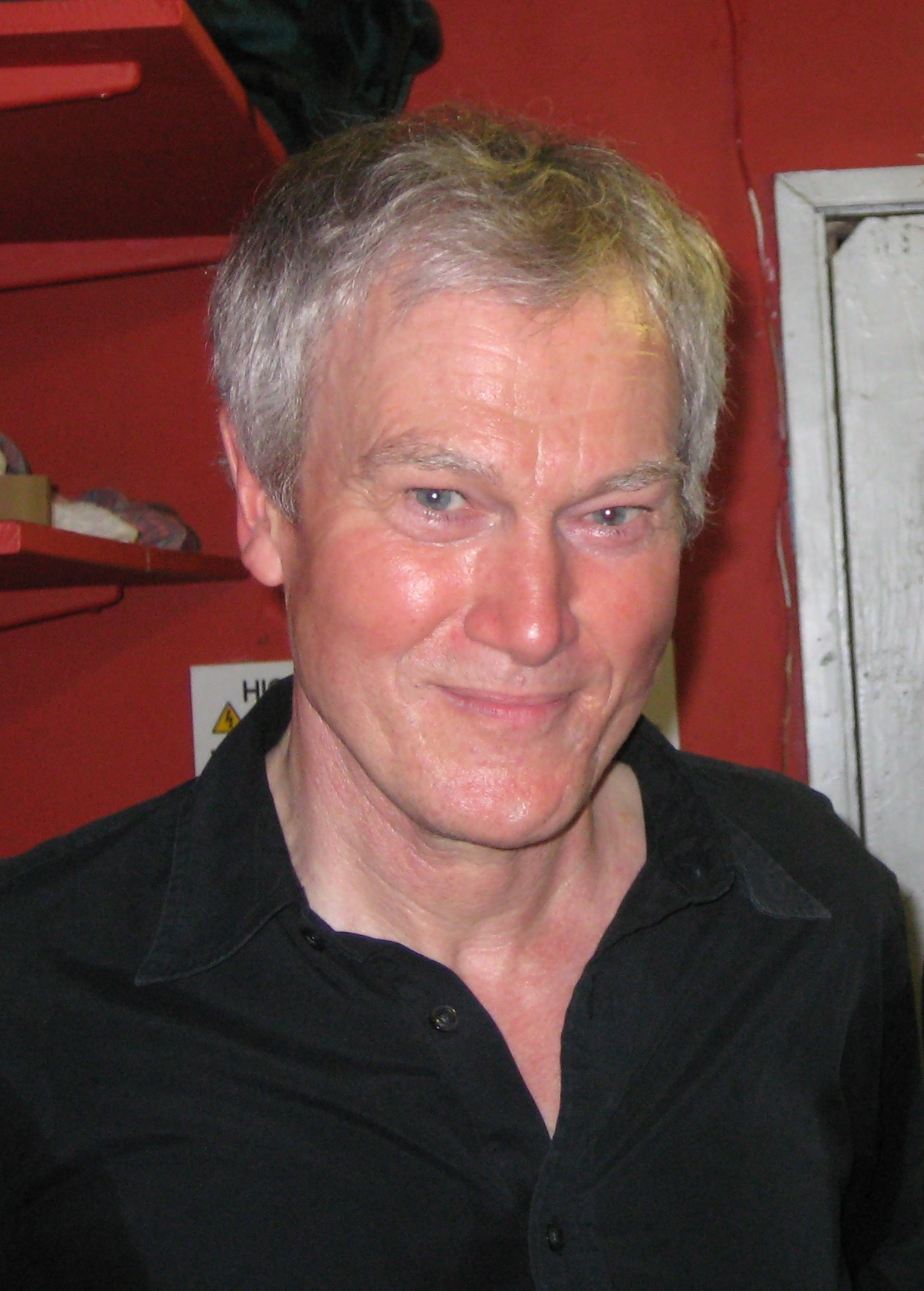
- Foxx in 2008

Background information
- Born: Dennis Leigh; 26 September 1948 (age 78); Chorley, Lancashire, England
- Genres: Art rock, synthpop, new wave, ambient, post-punk, electronic
- Instruments: Vocals, keyboards, guitars, percussion
- Years active: 1967–present
- Website: http://www.metamatic.com

John Foxx (born Dennis Leigh; 26 September 1948) is an English singer, musician, artist, photographer, graphic designer, writer, teacher and lecturer. He was the original lead singer of the new wave band Ultravox, before leaving to embark on a solo career in 1980 with the album Metamatic.

Primarily associated with electronic synthesizer music, he has also pursued a parallel career in graphic design and education. Andy Kellman of AllMusic described Foxx as an influential cult figure whose "detached, jolting vocal style inspired mainstream and underground artists across the decades".

== Early life and education ==
Leigh was born in Chorley, Lancashire, England. His father was a coal miner and pugilist, his mother a millworker. He was raised Catholic and educated at St Mary's Primary and St Augustine Secondary schools. Next he attended Harris College of Art in Preston and then the Royal College of Art in London.

During his youth in the 1960s he embraced the lifestyles of a mod and a hippy, while he formed his first band Woolly Fish in 1967 in Preston. He experimented with tape recorders and synthesisers whilst at the Royal College of Art.

Prior to 1973, he was singing and playing a 12-string guitar and occasionally supported Stack Waddy in Manchester, from which he later moved to London in order to escape what he saw as a lack of musical stimulus.

== Musical career ==
=== Tiger Lily ===
In April 1974, Leigh formed a band that would eventually be called Tiger Lily, composed of bassist Chris Allen and guitarist Stevie Shears, with Canadian drummer Warren Cann joining shortly afterwards in May 1974. The band played their first gig at the Marquee Club in August 1974, after which Billy Currie was recruited as violinist in October 1974.

Tiger Lily released a single in 1975 on Gull Records, the A-side of which was a cover of the Fats Waller track "Ain't Misbehavin'". It was commissioned for (but not subsequently used in) a movie of the same name. The B-side was the group's own song "Monkey Jive". Tiger Lily played a few gigs in London pubs between 1974 and 1975.

=== Ultravox (1976–1979) ===
After several changes of name, including Fire of London, The Zips and The Damned, the band became Ultravox! in October 1976. The group's style fused punk, glam, electronic, reggae and new wave music. At the same time, Leigh adopted his stage name of John Foxx:

Foxx is much more intelligent than I am, better looking, better lit. A kind of naively perfected entity. He's just like a recording, where you can make several performances until you get it right – or make a composite of several successful sections, then discard the rest.

Chris Allen, who had briefly gone by the name Chris St. John, changed his name again, to Chris Cross.

Once the band signed to Island Records, they released three albums during 1977–1978. The debut Ultravox! single, "Dangerous Rhythm", backed with "My Sex", was released on 4 February 1977. Their first album (the self-titled Ultravox!) was released three weeks later on 25 February 1977, produced by Steve Lillywhite and the band, with assistance from Brian Eno. It was followed by their second album Ha! Ha! Ha! in October 1977, which included the single "ROckWrok", although both were commercial failures.

For their third album, Systems of Romance, Ultravox abandoned the exclamation mark in their name. Also missing was their first guitarist, Stevie Shears, who was replaced by Robin Simon, from Neo. The album was co-produced by Conny Plank. Two singles were released from the album, "Slow Motion" and "Quiet Men". Sales were modest, but the album did gain the band exposure to a wider audience, including the United States.

During the recording of Systems of Romance, a song of the same name was written, but the band had no time to record it. It was later included on Foxx's second solo album The Garden. At Systems of Romance gigs, Foxx began to perform with the band three future solo songs, "He's a Liquid" and "Touch and Go" (later included on Metamatic, Foxx's first solo album) and "Walk Away" (included on The Garden). The latter song was not performed again by Foxx until 1983.

Ultravox were dropped by their record label at the very end of 1978. The band undertook a self-financed tour of the United States in February, during which they performed three new songs, "Touch and Go" and "He's a Liquid", which Foxx later recorded for Metamatic, and "Radio Beach". Foxx left the band at the end of the tour, and returned to solo work. He was replaced by Midge Ure.

=== Solo career (1980–1985) ===
After signing to Virgin Records, Foxx achieved two top 40 entries on the UK Singles Chart with his first solo singles, "Underpass" (No. 31) and "No-One Driving" (No. 32). Its parent album Metamatic was released on 17 January 1980, and peaked at No. 18 in the UK Albums Chart. Foxx played most of the synthesisers and "rhythm machines", as they were listed on the sleeve. One of the album's songs, "Metal Beat", takes its name from a CR-78 drum machine sound used on the record. Virgin released the album under the imprint name Metal Beat Records, which was used for Foxx releases throughout his contract with them.

The non-album single "Burning Car" followed in July 1980. Spending seven weeks on the UK charts, it reached its peak position at no. 35 in August. Foxx then worked on dozens of tracks for two projected albums, and one of these tracks, "My Face", was released on a flexi-disc given away with Smash Hits in October 1980.

Foxx's next album was The Garden, released in September 1981. It reached No. 24 in the UK Albums Chart. Musically it was a departure from the stark electropop of Metamatic to a sound resembling Ultravox's Systems of Romance. The Garden's starting point was "Systems of Romance", written by Foxx for the earlier album but not released at the time. The lead single "Europe After the Rain" became Foxx's fourth and last top 40 hit on the UK Singles Chart during a five-week chart run in August/September 1981.

In 1982, Foxx set up his own recording studio, designed by Andy Munro, also called The Garden, housed in an artists' collective in Shoreditch, East London, in a former warehouse also occupied by sculptors, painters and film makers. He produced some demo recordings for Virginia Astley's first album From Gardens Where We Feel Secure.

In 1982, Foxx provided some music for the soundtrack to Michelangelo Antonioni's film Identification of a Woman (Identificazione di una donna). In September that year, his third solo LP The Golden Section was released (UK No. 27). A development of The Garden, Foxx described the album as a "roots check" of his earliest musical influences, including The Beatles and English psychedelic music. It was followed by a tour, his first live performances since Ultravox.

The album In Mysterious Ways was issued in October 1985, which spent one week at No. 85 in the UK chart. Musically it was not considered a significant advance on the sound of his three previous releases, nor was it a commercial success although the album's lyrics are far more romantic than any of his previous albums. Foxx later said that at the time he felt divorced from any contemporary musical influences. However, he did produce, co-write and play on Pressure Points, by Anne Clark, the same year.

=== Withdrawal from the music scene (1985) ===
After In Mysterious Ways, Foxx temporarily left his career in pop music. He sold his recording studio and returned to his earlier career as a graphic artist, working under his real name of Dennis Leigh. Examples of this work include the book covers of Salman Rushdie's The Moor's Last Sigh, Jeanette Winterson's Sexing the Cherry, Anthony Burgess's A Dead Man in Deptford, and several books in the Arden Shakespeare series.

Foxx began to find inspiration in the underground house and acid music scenes in Detroit and London. With Nation 12 in the early 1990s, Foxx released two 12-inch singles, "Remember" (released 23 April 1990) and "Electrofear" (released 2 September 1991). The first was a collaboration with Tim Simenon, best known for his Bomb the Bass project. The group also wrote the music for the Bitmap Brothers computer games Speedball 2 (1990) and Gods (1991, "Into the Wonderful"). He also worked with LFO and made the music video for their eponymous debut single. Around this time, Foxx also taught on the Graphic Arts and Design degree course at Leeds Metropolitan University.

=== Re-emergence with Louis Gordon (1997) ===
On 24 March 1997, Foxx made a return to the music scene with the simultaneous release of two albums, Shifting City and Cathedral Oceans on Metamatic Records. Shifting City was Foxx's first collaboration with Manchester musician Louis Gordon.

On 11 October 1997, Foxx played his first public gig since 1983 at The Astoria, London. A limited-edition twelve-track CD (1,000 numbered copies only) entitled Subterranean Omnidelic Exotour was available for purchase by ticketholders. Foxx and Gordon continued to work together, performing live on the Subterranean Omnnidelic Exotour in 1997 and 1998 and releasing a second album The Pleasures of Electricity, in September 2001. Two years later they toured again, to promote the album Crash and Burn, released in September 2003 on Foxx's own Metamatic Records.

Three collaborative albums with Louis Gordon were released in late 2006: Live From a Room (As Big as a City), a 'live' studio album from the 2003 tour (released in association with an interview CD entitled "The Hidden Man") in October; the studio album From Trash in November and a further album from the same sessions a few weeks later during the accompanying mini-tour. This two-CD package, entitled Sideways, included ten original tracks plus two extended versions of songs on From Trash. The second disc contained an extensive interview with Foxx describing the making of From Trash which was available only at concerts on the 2006 tour.

The "live in the studio" recordings originally distributed in limited edition during the 1998 Subterranean Omnidelic Exotour were later made available through the double-CD issue "The Golden Section Tour + The Omnidelic Exotour" (2002) and the double CD re-issue of "Shifting City" in 2009. The album Retro Future (2007) is a live-on-stage performance recorded on the Exotour, on 10 January 1998 at Shrewsbury Music Hall. It was released for Foxx's 2007 Metamatic tour, and was originally limited to 1000 pressings.

=== Collaborations ===
Foxx has performed and recorded with a variety of artists and musicians since returning to the music scene in the mid-nineties, most notably with Louis Gordon but also with Harold Budd, Jori Hulkkonen, Robin Guthrie (formerly of Cocteau Twins), Ruben Garcia and The Belbury Circle.

In April 2005, Foxx guested on Finnish DJ Jori Hulkkonen's album Dualizm, where he provided vocals for "Dislocated" which Hulkkonen had written for him. Foxx and Hulkkonen issued a further collaborative EP in 2008 entitled Never Been Here Before. A remix of Dislocated was issued on Foxx's 2010 compilation Metatronic, while Never Been Here Before appears on the 2013 compilation Metadelic. Hulkkonen played as supporting act to the first John Foxx And The Maths concert at The Roundhouse in 2010 and also joined Foxx and the band onstage to perform "Underpass". A new EP entitled European Splendour issued as John Foxx + Jori Hulkkonen was released in August 2013 on the Sugarcane Recordings label.

=== Cathedral Oceans ===
The first volume of Cathedral Oceans was released at the same time as Foxx's comeback collaboration with Louis Gordon and the Shifting City album. In stark contrast to the latter, Cathedral Oceans is a more ethereal, ambient work combined with Foxx's own artwork of overgrown natural settings superimposed onto faces of statues. 2003 also saw the release of the second volume of Cathedral Oceans as well as another ambient record, the double CD Translucence and Drift Music with Harold Budd. In 2004, from September through October, a collection of Cathedral Oceans images was exhibited at BCB Art, Hudson, New York, and in the following year Cathedral Oceans III was released.

A second surround sound DVD of Cathedral Oceans was released in March 2007. This contained his artwork made into a film intended as a "slowly moving, hallucinogenic, digital stained glass window, intended to be projected as big as possible onto architecture and in public places." The work was premiered in November 2006 at the Leeds International Film Festival. In July 2007, Foxx exhibited some of his Cathedral Oceans artwork as large format digital prints at Fulham Palace as part of the RetroFuture exhibition hosted by ArtHertz. On the opening night, Foxx performed a piano piece accompanying a reading from his unpublished novel The Quiet Man in front of an audience for the first time.

In 2005, Foxx appeared on stage at the Brighton Pavilion with Harold Budd and Bill Nelson as part of a concert to celebrate the work of the retiring pianist, which led to the announcement in October that year that Foxx would be involved in collaborations with Jah Wobble, Robin Guthrie, Steve Jansen and Nelson.

=== Tiny Colour Movies ===
In June 2006, Foxx released an instrumental solo album, Tiny Colour Movies, consisting of 15 instrumental tracks inspired by short art films he saw at a private screening. His official website described these as having the "filmic, atmospheric approach" of the Metamatic-era instrumental B-sides "Glimmer", "Film One" and "Mr No". On 18 November 2006, Foxx gave a performance of the work at the Duke of York's cinema in Brighton, where Tiny Colour Movies was premiered as part of the city's Film Festival. Edited versions of the movies were shown on a big screen for the first time with Foxx playing a mix of live and recorded accompaniment from the album. This 'film' was shown again at Fulham Palace in July 2007, and in a slightly revised format at the ICA and as part of the 21st International Film Festival, in Leeds during November that year.

In September 2007, a remastered edition of Metamatic was released as a two-CD pack containing the original album, plus most of the associated B-sides and extra tracks from the period, including two 'new' songs re-assembled from original music recorded at the time. In the same month, a showcase of Foxx's work was held at the Institute of Contemporary Arts in London, where he performed another version of Tiny Colour Movies and hosted a question-and-answer session. This was followed by the first live performance of the entire Metamatic album, during which Foxx and Louis Gordon were accompanied on stage by Steve D'Agostino. Later in the evening, the DVD of Cathedral Oceans was shown in one of the ICA cinema studios. In October, Foxx and Gordon toured the UK with Metamatic, culminating in a show at Cargo in London. The year ended with two shows at the Luminaire in London. A live album titled A New Kind of Man, culled from the Metamatic performances in 2007, was released on Metamatic Records on 28 April 2008.

Foxx presented three different pieces of his solo work in the space of one week in June 2008. This began with a showing of Tiny Colour Movies at the Caixaforum in Barcelona on 14 June 2008, followed by a performance of Cathedral Oceans III inside the Great Hall at Durham Castle, England on 18 June. He then travelled to Italy and presented an extract from The Quiet Man at the 14th Festival Internazionale di Poesia in Genoa.

=== Further solo work ===
In December 2010, Foxx participated in the recording of John Cage's 4'33" as part of the Cage Against the Machine collective.

In March 2013, Foxx took part in the On Vanishing Land project, a work by British sound artists and theorists Mark Fisher and Justin Barton. Described as a magisterial audio-essay On Vanishing Land evokes a walk undertaken by the artists along the Suffolk coastline in 2005, from Felixstowe container port to the Anglo-Saxon burial ground at Sutton Hoo. The work integrates new compositions by John Foxx and other digital musicians Baron Mordant, Dolly Dolly, Ekoplekz, Farmers of Vega, Gazelle Twin, Pete Wiseman, Raime and Skjolbrot. As part of the event presentation, on 7 March, Foxx premièred a new piano work entitled Electricity and Ghosts with accompanying films made by himself and Karborn.

In 2015, Foxx contributed to the soundtrack of the feature-length film Blue Velvet Revisited, with Cult With No Name and Tuxedomoon, which consists of footage shot during the making of David Lynch's film Blue Velvet.

=== John Foxx and the Maths ===
In December 2009, the Metamatic website announced the new musical project John Foxx and the Maths, the name given to the work written and produced by John Foxx and Benge. Benge had already broken the news on his own blog in November calling The Maths "a new album project". An initial download-only single, "Destination" / "September Town", was released in December 2009 by Townsend Records and later via iTunes.

The duo continued to work in Benge's studio throughout 2010 and some new tracks were previewed at the Short Circuit electronic music festival at The Roundhouse in London on 5 June 2010. A new album entitled Interplay was announced in January 2011 and released on 21 March. The album gained critical acclaim; The Quietus called it "one of the finest electronic records you'll hear in 2011", and launched a remix competition to coincide with the release of the album. Stems of the album track "Shatterproof" were made available for download, remixing and re-uploading via the SoundCloud site. The competition was won by Dave Poeme Electronique. The release of the album was preceded by a remix of "Shatterproof" on YouTube.

Another live event featuring John Foxx and the Maths was held in April 2011. Back to the Phuture was billed as a special electronic music event, featuring live sets from Foxx, Gary Numan, Mirrors and Motor, plus a DJ set by Daniel Miller. Again, a selection of tracks from the new album and Foxx's past works were played.

A cover version of the Pink Floyd track "Have a Cigar" was recorded for a tribute CD issued by Mojo magazine with their October 2011 issue. It was announced shortly afterwards that the version on the CD was not the completed version, and a free download of the finished version was offered via the Mojo website.

A nine-date UK tour by John Foxx and the Maths was announced in July 2011, plus live performances in Poland and Belgium. A second album, The Shape of Things, was also announced prior to the tour and was initially only available for purchase at tour venues.

In January 2013, it was announced that John Foxx and the Maths would be the support act for Orchestral Manoeuvres in the Dark's English Electric spring tour. The 13-date tour ran from 30 March to 14 April 2013. The only headline live show for 2013 was held on 7 June at the Brighton Concorde. The live-in-the-studio album, Rhapsody, was issued to coincide with these live performances.

An announcement of Foxx's official Facebook account in May 2019 stated that John Foxx and the Maths were back in the studio working on a new album, this time with Robin Simon on guitar. A short video clip of Foxx and Simon in Benge's studio was also posted on Benge's official account. The resulting album, Howl, was released in July 2020, and reached No. 80 in the UK Albums Chart in early August 2020, becoming the first John Foxx and the Maths album to chart in the UK, and Foxx's first charting album in the UK since 1985.

=== "Underpass" revisited ===
Over the years John Foxx's first solo single "Underpass", originally released in 1980, has come to be considered a milestone in the development of popular electronic music, and has gained recognition as iconic in the development of the electropop genre. In March 2010, Berlin producer Mark Reeder remixed the track "Underpass" (Reeder Sinister Subway Mix) for John Foxx's CD/DVD retrospective compilation Metatronic. Reeder not only remixed his versions from the original master tapes in stereo for the CD, but he also made 5.1 mixes of his own remixes and Foxx's original 1980s version.

The track was re-issued in May 2013 as a special edition 12-inch vinyl. The disc features two new remixes. The sleeve features new artwork created by Jonathan Barnbrook who has designed the covers of all the John Foxx and the Maths releases.

== Work outside music ==
In 2000, a Porcupine Tree release called Lightbulb Sun was issued with cover art by Foxx. In December 2007, Foxx exhibited some of his photographic works in an exhibition called Cinemascope at the Coningsby Gallery in west London. The images were part of three collections, "Grey Suit Music", "Tiny Colour Movies" and "Cathedral Oceans". His design work was the subject of an article in the UK monthly Creative review in September 2010. Between July and August 2016 an exhibition entitled "Europe After the Rain" was held at the University of South Australia featuring images made from photographs and found objects gathered over a period of around thirty years by Foxx in his travels across Britain and Europe.

In November 2020 Foxx published The Quiet Man, a collection of short stories.

== Tributes and recognition ==
In the run up to the John Foxx and the Maths Interplay tour in October 2011, Artrocker ran a series of articles on Foxx, including a filmed interview taken at The Garden studios in London. Special features during the "John Foxx Week" also contained quotes and comments about his work from a variety of different musicians and film-makers, including The Orb, Vincent Gallo, members of Ladytron and Duran Duran, director Alex Proyas, and Awaydays creator Kevin Sampson. The corresponding printed version Artrocker (Issue 115) also featured Foxx and Gary Numan together in an in-depth interview. The magazine contains further tributes by Philip Oakey of the Human League and Jim Kerr of Simple Minds.

In May 2013, "Exponentialism", an EP of four cover versions of John Foxx tracks by I Speak Machine ("My Sex" and "I Want To Be A Machine") and Gazelle Twin ("He's A Liquid" and "Never Let Me Go"), was issued on Metamatic records. In 2011, Gazelle Twin told Artrocker magazine: "'Never Let Me Go' is a mirage of maternal comfort in a toxic and unrelenting world. It's one of those songs I wish I'd made; drenched in analogue pulses and drones. a lullaby-like synth melody accompanying an android (yet emotional) dual-vocal part. I can definitely feel a cover coming on".

In June 2014, it was announced that Foxx was to receive an honorary degree from Edge Hill University, Ormskirk, Lancashire. He was made an honorary Doctor of Philosophy during the ceremony at the university on 21 July 2014.

== Discography ==
=== Solo studio albums ===
- Metamatic (1980)
- The Garden (1981)
- The Golden Section (1983)
- In Mysterious Ways (1985)
- Cathedral Oceans (1997)
- Cathedral Oceans II (2003)
- Cathedral Oceans III (2005)
- Tiny Colour Movies (2006)
- My Lost City (2009)
- D.N.A. (2010)
- B-Movie (Ballardian Video Neuronica) (2014)
- London Overgrown (2015)
- The Marvellous Notebook (2022)
- Avenham (2023)
- The Arcades Project (2023)
- Wherever You Are (2025)
