= Ultravox discography =

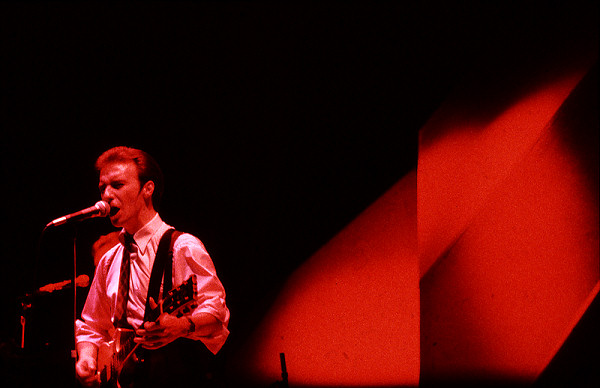
- Midge Ure, Ultravox, Chateau Neuf, Oslo, Norway, 4 November 1981.
- Studio albums: 11
- Extended plays: 6
- Live albums: 6
- Compilation albums: 16
- Singles: 32
- Video albums: 5
- Music videos: 15
- Box sets: 3

This is the discography of the British post punk / synth-pop band Ultravox. While active from 1975 to 1996, the band released a number of LPs and CDs, although more discs were released after their demise. An anthology disc was planned, according to their official web page.

== Albums ==
=== Studio albums ===
Title	Album details	Peak chart positions										Certifications
Title	Album details	UK	AUS	CAN	GER	JPN	NL	NOR	NZ	SWE	US	Certifications
Ultravox! (as Ultravox!)	Released: 25 February 1977; Label: Island; Formats: LP, MC, 8-track	—	—	—	—	—	—	—	—	25	—	
Ha! Ha! Ha! (as Ultravox!)	Released: 14 October 1977; Label: Island; Formats: LP, MC	—	—	—	—	—	—	—	—	—	—	
Systems of Romance	Released: 8 September 1978; Label: Island; Formats: LP, MC	—	—	—	—	—	—	—	—	—	—	
Vienna	Released: 11 July 1980; Label: Chrysalis; Formats: LP, MC	3	4	80	22	79	2	18	2	6	164	UK: Platinum; NZ: Platinum
Rage in Eden	Released: 11 September 1981; Label: Chrysalis; Formats: LP, MC	4	20	45	48	—	29	20	4	5	144	UK: Gold; NZ: Gold
Quartet	Released: 15 October 1982; Label: Chrysalis; Formats: LP, MC	6	35	—	13	75	—	19	38	13	61	UK: Gold
Lament	Released: 6 April 1984; Label: Chrysalis; Formats: CD, LP, MC	8	41	58	18	—	24	10	7	8	115	UK: Gold
U-Vox	Released: 13 October 1986; Label: Chrysalis; Formats: CD, LP, MC	9	92	—	49	—	—	—	—	16	—	UK: Gold
Revelation	Released: 10 May 1993; Label: DSB; Formats: CD, LP, MC	—	—	—	—	—	—	—	—	—	—	
Ingenuity	Released: 10 November 1994; Label: Intercord; Formats: CD, MC	—	—	—	—	—	—	—	—	—	—	
Brilliant	Released: 25 May 2012; Label: Chrysalis; Formats: CD, 2xLP	21	—	—	27	—	—	—	—	36	—	
"—" denotes releases that did not chart or were not released in that territory.

=== Live albums ===
Title	Album details	Peak chart positions		Certifications
Title	Album details	UK	SWE	Certifications
Monument the Soundtrack	Released: 14 October 1983; Label: Chrysalis; Formats: LP, MC	9	49	UK: Gold
BBC Radio 1 Live in Concert	Released: 9 November 1992; Label: Windsong International; Formats: CD, LP	—	—	
Future Picture – 'Live'	Released: 12 June 1995; Label: Receiver; Formats: CD	—	—	
Return to Eden: Live at the Roundhouse	Released: 5 April 2010; Label: Chrysalis; Formats: CD	75	—	
2012 Tour	Released: October 2012; Label: Abbey Road Live Here Now/Chrysalis; Formats: 2xCD	—	—	
Live at the Rainbow 1977	Released: 19 March 2021; Label: UMC/Island Records; Formats: digital download, LP	—	—	
"—" denotes releases that did not chart or were not released in that territory.

=== Compilation albums ===
Title	Album details	Peak chart positions									Certifications
Title	Album details	UK	AUS	CAN	GER	IT	JPN	NZ	SWE	US	Certifications
Three Into One	Released: 6 June 1980; Label: Island; Formats: LP, MC	—	—	—	—	—	—	—	—	—	
New Europeans	Released: 21 February 1982; Label: Chrysalis; Formats: LP, MC; Japan-only release	—	—	—	—	—	47	—	—	—	
The Collection	Released: 2 November 1984; Label: Chrysalis; Formats: CD, LP, 2xLP, MC	2	14	93	11	12	—	2	45	203	UK: 3× Platinum; NZ: Platinum
If I Was: The Very Best of Midge Ure & Ultravox	Released: 22 February 1993; Label: Chrysalis; Formats: CD, LP, MC	10	—	—	—	—	—	—	—	—	UK: Silver
Slow Motion	Released: 4 October 1993; Label: Spectrum Music; Formats: CD, MC	—	—	—	—	—	—	—	—	—	
Rare, Vol. 1	Released: 11 October 1993; Label: Chrysalis; Formats: CD, MC	—	—	—	—	—	—	—	—	—	
Rare, Vol. 2	Released: 8 August 1994; Label: Chrysalis; Formats: CD, MC	—	—	—	—	—	—	—	—	—	
Dancing with Tears in My Eyes	Released: 16 October 1995; Label: Music for Pleasure; Formats: CD, MC; Reissued in 2003 as The Best of Ultravox	—	—	—	—	—	—	—	—	—	
The Voice: The Best of Ultravox	Released: 22 December 1997; Label: EMI; Formats: CD, MC	—	—	—	—	—	—	—	—	—	UK: Silver
Extended Ultravox	Released: 16 February 1998; Label: EMI Gold; Formats: CD, MC	—	—	—	—	—	—	—	—	—	
The Island Years	Released: 22 March 1999; Label: Spectrum Music; Formats: CD	—	—	—	—	—	—	—	—	—	
The Very Best of Midge Ure & Ultravox	Released: 29 October 2001; Label: EMI; Formats: CD	45	—	—	—	—	—	—	—	—	
Finest	Released: 19 April 2004; Label: EMI; Formats: 2xCD	—	—	—	—	—	—	—	—	—	
The Very Best of Ultravox	Released: 6 April 2009; Label: Chrysalis/EMI; Formats: CD+DVD; CD reissued in 2011 as Essential	35	—	—	—	—	—	—	—	—	
Essential	Released: 31 October 2011; Label: Chrysalis/EMI; Formats: CD	—	—	—	—	—	—	—	—	—	
Extended	Released: 16 November 2018; Label: Chrysalis; Formats: 2xCD, 4xLP, digital download	—	—	—	—	—	—	—	—	—	
"—" denotes releases that did not chart or were not released in that territory.

=== Box sets ===
Title	Album details
3 Original CDs	Released: 6 November 1995; Label: Island; Formats: 3xCD
The Albums 1980–2012	Released: 28 October 2013; Label: Chrysalis; Formats: 8xCD
The Island Years	Released: 10 June 2016; Label: Caroline International/Island; Formats: 4xCD

== EPs ==
Title	Album details
Retro (as Ultravox!)	Released: 10 February 1978; Label: Island; Formats: 7"
Mini LP (as Ultravox!)	Released: July 1981; Label: Island; Formats: 12"; Australasia-only release
The Peel Sessions	Released: 4 April 1988; Label: Strange Fruit; Formats: 12"
Moments from Eden	Released: 2 May 2011; Label: Absolute; Formats: 10"+CD, digital download
Brilliant – Blank & Jones Remixes	Released: 27 July 2012; Label: Chrysalis; Formats: digital download
Live (Single Edit) 4 Track E.P.	Released: 24 September 2012; Label: EMI; Formats: digital download

== Singles ==
Title	Year	Peak chart positions										Certifications	Album
Title	Year	UK	AUS	BEL (FL)	GER	IRE	JPN	NL	NZ	SWI	US	Certifications	Album
"Ain't Misbehavin'" (as Tiger Lily)	1975	—	—	—	—	—	—	—	—	—	—		Non-album single
"Dangerous Rhythm" (as Ultravox!)	1977	—	—	—	—	—	—	—	—	—	—		Ultravox!
"Young Savage" (as Ultravox!)	1977	—	—	—	—	—	—	—	—	—	—		Non-album single
"ROckWrok" (as Ultravox!)	1977	—	—	—	—	—	—	—	—	—	—		Ha! Ha! Ha!
"Frozen Ones" (as Ultravox!; Germany-only release)	1978	—	—	—	—	—	—	—	—	—	—		Ha! Ha! Ha!
"Slow Motion"	1978	— (Note: This single did not enter the UK Singles Chart, but did reach number 86 on the Record Business Singles Chart.)	—	—	—	—	—	—	—	—	—		Systems of Romance
"Quiet Men"	1978	— (Note: This single did not enter the UK Singles Chart, but did reach number 112 on the Record Business Singles Chart.)	—	—	—	—	—	—	—	—	—		Systems of Romance
"Sleepwalk"	1980	29	—	—	—	—	—	—	—	—	—		Vienna
"Passing Strangers"	1980	57	—	—	—	—	—	—	—	—	—		Vienna
"Vienna"	1981	2	11	1	14	1	—	1	2	—	—	UK: Gold	Vienna
"Slow Motion" (reissue)	1981	33	—	—	—	—	—	—	—	—	—		Non-album single
"All Stood Still"	1981	8	—	—	69	14	—	—	—	—	—	UK: Silver	Vienna
"The Thin Wall"	1981	14	95	—	—	16	—	—	—	—	—		Rage in Eden
"New Europeans" (Japan-only release)	1981	—	—	—	—	—	36	—	—	—	—		New Europeans
"The Voice"	1981	16	—	—	—	27	—	—	29	—	—		Rage in Eden
"Reap the Wild Wind"	1982	12	69	—	—	10	—	—	—	—	71		Quartet
"Hymn"	1982	11	—	—	9	15	—	—	—	6	—	UK: Silver	Quartet
"Visions in Blue"	1983	15	—	—	—	25	—	—	—	—	—		Quartet
"We Came to Dance"	1983	18	—	—	—	22	—	39	—	—	—		Quartet
"One Small Day"	1984	27	—	—	—	16	—	—	—	—	—		Lament
"Dancing with Tears in My Eyes"	1984	3	58	2	7	8	—	12	38	16	108		Lament
"Lament"	1984	22	—	—	—	—	—	—	47	—	—		Lament
"Heart of the Country" (Germany-only release)	1984	—	—	—	—	—	—	—	—	—	—		Lament
"Love's Great Adventure"	1984	12	—	27	—	15	—	49	—	—	—		The Collection
"Same Old Story"	1986	31	93	—	—	28	—	—	—	—	—		U-Vox
"All Fall Down"	1986	30	—	—	—	21	—	—	—	—	—		U-Vox
"All in One Day"	1987	88	—	—	—	—	—	—	—	—	—		U-Vox
"Vienna 92"	1992	—	—	—	—	—	—	—	—	—	—		Non-album single
"Vienna" (reissue)	1993	13	—	—	—	20	—	—	—	—	—		If I Was: The Very Best of Midge Ure & Ultravox
"I Am Alive"	1993	—	—	—	80	—	—	—	—	—	—		Revelation
"Ingenuity" (Australasia-only release)	1995	—	—	—	—	—	—	—	—	—	—		Ingenuity
"There Goes a Beautiful World" (Australasia-only release)	1995	—	—	—	—	—	—	—	—	—	—		Ingenuity
"—" denotes releases that did not chart or were not released in that territory.

=== Promotional singles ===
Title	Year	Album
"Wide Boys"	1977	Ultravox!
"Quirks"	1977	Ha!-Ha!-Ha!
"System of Love" (France-only release)	1992	Revelation
"Giving It All Back" (Germany-only release)	1994	Ingenuity

== Videos ==
=== Video albums ===
Title	Album details
Monument – The Soundtrack	Released: November 1983; Label: Palace Video; Formats: VHS, LD
The Collection	Released: December 1984; Label: Chrysalis/Palace Video; Formats: VHS, LD
The Very Best of Ultravox	Released: 6 April 2009; Label: Chrysalis/EMI; Formats: CD+DVD
Return to Eden: Live at the Roundhouse	Released: 5 April 2010; Label: Chrysalis; Formats: DVD
Brilliant Beginnings	Released: 2012; Label: Eden Films; Formats: DVD; Documentary film about the album Brilliant

=== Music videos ===
Title	Year	Director
"Passing Strangers"	1980	Russell Mulcahy
"Vienna"	1981	Russell Mulcahy
"The Thin Wall"	1981	Russell Mulcahy
"The Voice"	1981	Russell Mulcahy
"The Voice" (Original Version)	1981	Midge Ure & Chris Cross
"Reap the Wild Wind"	1982	Midge Ure & Chris Cross
"Hymn"	1982	Midge Ure & Chris Cross
"Visions in Blue"	1983	Midge Ure & Chris Cross
"We Came to Dance"	1983	Midge Ure & Chris Cross
"One Small Day"	1984	Midge Ure & Chris Cross
"Dancing with Tears in My Eyes"	1984	Midge Ure & Chris Cross
"Lament"	1984	Midge Ure & Chris Cross
"Love's Great Adventure"	1984	Midge Ure & Chris Cross
"Same Old Story"	1986	Midge Ure & Chris Cross
"All Fall Down"	1986	Godley & Creme
