= The Island Years (Ultravox album) =

Compilation album by Ultravox
- Released: March 22, 1999
- Recorded: 1976–1978
- Genres: Rock; pop; new wave; glam rock; proto-punk; synth-pop
- Labels: Spectrum; PolyGram
- Producers: Ultravox; Brian Eno; Steve Lillywhite; Conny Plank

Ultravox chronology
| Extended Ultravox (1998) | The Island Years (1999) | The Best of Ultravox (2003) |

Professional ratings
Review scores
| Source | Rating |
|---|---|
| AllMusic | 3/5 stars |

The Island Years is a compilation by Ultravox, released on March 22, 1999 by PolyGram and Spectrum labels. It contains songs from their three first albums (Ultravox!, Ha! Ha! Ha! and Systems of Romance), when John Foxx was the group's vocalist and frontman, and another two guitarists, Stevie Shears and Robin Simon were with them (although not at the same time). The album is a compilation of the band's early years, before Midge Ure became a member, and the band scored a number of hits in the 1980s.

This is an updated version of the Slow Motion compilation, released in 1993 by the same labels.

The band are credited as Ultravox!, although the band decided to drop the exclamation mark (!) before recording their Systems Of Romance album.

== Track listing ==
1. "Dangerous Rhythm"
2. "My Sex"
3. "I Want to Be a Machine"
4. "The Wild, the Beautiful and the Damned"
5. "Life at Rainbow's End"
6. "Young Savage"
7. "Slip Away"
8. "ROckWrok"
9. "Hiroshima Mon Amour"
10. "Distant Smile"
11. "Man Who Dies Every Day"
12. "While I'm Still Alive"
13. "Slow Motion"
14. "Quiet Men"
15. "Cross Fade"
16. "Just for a Moment"

== Personnel ==
- John Foxx – vocals
- Chris Cross – bass, synthesizer, backing vocals
- Warren Cann – drums, percussion, backing vocals
- Billy Currie – violin, keyboards, synthesizer
- Stevie Shears – guitar 1, 3 – 8, 10 – 12
- Robin Simon – guitar 13 and 14
