= Three into One =

Compilation album by Ultravox
- Released: June 6, 1980
- Genre: New wave
- Length: 39:33
- Label: Island
- Producers: Brian Eno; Ultravox; Steve Lillywhite; Conny Plank; Dave Hutchins

Ultravox chronology
Systems of Romance (1978)	Three into One (1980)	Vienna (1980)

Professional ratings
Review scores
Source	Rating
Allmusic	3/5 stars
Billboard	(unrated)

Three into One is the first compilation album from the band Ultravox, released in June 6, 1980 in the UK. The album is a compilation of songs from their first three albums, Ultravox!, Ha! Ha! Ha! and Systems of Romance, plus a non-album track Young Savage (known also from the band's only Peel session) and therefore concentrates on the earlier incarnation of the band from the 1970s featuring John Foxx, as opposed to the more recognisable 1980s line-up which featured Midge Ure.

The vinyl version and CD version of the song "Quiet Men" are different. The version on vinyl comes from the single and has an abrupt end, while the CD version is longer and fades out at the end.

== Track listing ==
1. "Young Savage" – 2:59
2. "ROckWrok" – 3:35
3. "Dangerous Rhythm" – 4:16
4. "The Man Who Dies Everyday" – 4:12
5. "The Wild, the Beautiful and the Damned" – 5:54
6. "Slow Motion" – 3:27
7. "Just for a Moment" – 3:08
8. "Quiet Men" – 4:07
9. "My Sex" – 3:04
10. "Hiroshima Mon Amour" – 5:11
- Tracks 1, 3, and 4 written by Cann/Cross/Currie/Foxx/Shears.
- Track 2 written by Foxx.
- Tracks 5, 8, 9, and 10 written by Cross/Currie/Foxx.
- Track 6 written by Cann/Cross/Currie/Foxx/Simon.
- Track 7 written by Currie/Foxx

== Personnel ==
Ultravox

- Warren Cann - drums and vocals
- Chris Cross - bass and vocals
- Billy Currie - violin and keyboards
- John Foxx - vocals
- Stevie Shears - guitar (on tracks 1, 2, 3, 4, 5, 9, and 10)
- Robin Simon - guitar (on tracks 6, 7, and 8)

Additional personnel

- Terry Barham - assistant engineer
