= Slow Motion (Ultravox song) =

1978 song by Ultravox

Single by Ultravox

from the album Systems of Romance
- B-side: "Dislocation"
- Released: August 11, 1978
- Recorded: 1978
- Genre: Synth-pop
- Label: Island
- Songwriters: John Foxx; Robin Simon; Billy Currie; Chris Cross
- Producers: Conny Plank; Ultravox

Ultravox singles chronology
"Frozen Ones" (1977)	"Slow Motion" (1978)	"Quiet Men" (1978)

"Slow Motion" is a song by the British new wave and synth-pop band Ultravox, and the first single from the then-forthcoming Systems of Romance album, released by Island Records on August 11, 1978, with a limited edition clear/opaque 12-inch single released on the same date. It subsequently spent four weeks on the UK Singles Chart in March–April 1981, peaking at no. 33, after being reissued by Island Records on 7-inch and cassette single formats in March 1981.

"Slow Motion" was an important influence to Gary Numan who would have commercial success with electronic pop the following year. Numan said of the song: "This was a fantastic fusion of different elements and set a standard I then tried very, very hard to reach with 'Are "Friends" Electric?' and 'Cars'. I was trying to be as good as Ultravox."

== About the song ==
"Slow Motion" was the material of a changing band. It was the first single featuring Robin Simon as guitarist (replacing Stevie Shears) and also the first under the new name "Ultravox", without the exclamation mark. New sounds were provided by the use of a guitar multi effects pedal set up, using 5 pedals into the guitar amplifier, which also added a tremolo effect, unusual in an era where guitarists would use a minumum of pedals, usually just for lead guitar. A timed echo effect was also added to sections of the guitar at mixdown, creating a dual echo effect. A synthesizer was used to provide the bass part, also very unusual for the time, particularly in a rock band format.

The song was performed live on Old Grey Whistle Test in early 1978, before the release of the single and the Systems of Romance album. It was also performed live by the subsequent line up with new vocalist & guitarist Midge Ure on their first tour in 1979 and the Vienna tour in 1980.

== Track listing ==
=== Original released version ===
1. "Slow Motion" – 3:27
2. "Dislocation" – 2:55

=== 3-track EP ===
Released by Island Records on March 2, 1981

==== A-side ====
1. "Slow Motion"
2. "Quiet Men" (7-inch single version)

==== B-side ====
1. "Hiroshima Mon Amour" (Ha! Ha! Ha! album version alternate mix)

=== 4-track double single EP ===
Released the same day as the 3-track EP

==== A-side ====
1. "Quiet Men" (7-inch single version)
2. "Hiroshima Mon Amour" (ROckWrok single version)

==== B-side ====
1. "Slow Motion"
2. "Dislocation"

=== 4-track "1+1" Cassette EP ===
Released a week later on March 9, 1981

==== A-side ====
1. "Slow Motion"
2. "Hiroshima Mon Amour" (Ha! Ha! Ha! album version alternate mix)
3. "Quiet Men" (album version)
4. "Dislocation"

==== B-side ====
B-side is blank to enable personal recording
