= Young Savage =

Single by Ultravox!

from the album Ha! Ha! Ha!
- B-side: "Slip Away" (Live at the Rainbow)
- Released: May 28, 1977
- Genre: Rock
- Label: Island
- Songwriters: Warren Cann; Chris Cross; Billy Currie; John Foxx; Stevie Shears
- Producers: Ultravox!; Steve Lillywhite

Ultravox! singles chronology
| "Dangerous Rhythm" (1977) | "Young Savage" (1977) | "ROckWrok" (1977) |

"Young Savage" is the second single by Ultravox! It was released as a single by Island Records on May 28, 1977 during a time of experimentation to define a new sound for the band in advance of their second album.

The song was made in a punk style, although the band denied it was a 'punk' song, pointing out that Billy Currie's keyboard playing is in a psychedelic style. It is their first release from the Ha! Ha! Ha! sessions, and is notably different from the material on their first album, Ultravox!, which had more glam songs. A definitive song in the band's development, and a popular single at the time, the 2006 reissue edition of the latter album (IMCD 325) contains it as bonus track. "Young Savage" was also improbably named as record of the week on Mark & Lard's Radio 1 show in 2002.

The B-Side of "Young Savage" is a live version of "Slip Away", recorded during a gig at The Rainbow in London in 1977.

"Young Savage" is one of four live tracks featured on the Retro EP (IEP 8), released on February 24, 1978. This performance was recorded at the Marquee in London. The live version as featured on the Retro EP is also one of the bonus tracks on the 2006 edition of Ha! Ha! Ha!.

"Young Savage" was a regular feature of Ultravox live shows and was included in the set performed on their last tour with John Foxx in the US during February and March 1979. The song was not performed live again until a new version was played by John Foxx as part of his live set with Louis Gordon in Japan during September 2008 and for the first time in the UK for thirty years at Cargo in London on October 16, 2008. The song was featured in the 2009 film Awaydays and also accompanies its trailer. On BBC 6 Music, December 13, 2013, Brett Anderson and Mat Osman of Suede chose the song as one of their playlist; Brett described it as "really exciting - glammy, punky, violent."

== Track list ==
- A: Young Savage
- B: Slip Away (Live at the Rainbow)
