= The Voice (Ultravox song) =

Single by Ultravox

from the album Rage in Eden
- B-side: "Paths and Angles"; "Private Lives (Live)"; "All Stood Still (Live)"
- Released: October 30, 1981
- Recorded: 1981 at Conny’s Studio in Cologne, West Germany
- Genre: Synth-pop; new wave
- Length: 4:23
- Label: Chrysalis
- Songwriters: Warren Cann; Chris Cross; Billy Currie; Midge Ure
- Producers: Ultravox; Conny Plank

Ultravox singles chronology
"The Thin Wall" (1981)	"The Voice" (1981)	"Reap the Wild Wind" (1982)

Music video
- "The Voice" (video #2) by Ultravox on YouTube

Audio
- "The Voice" (album version) by Ultravox on YouTube

"The Voice" is Ultravox's second single from the Rage in Eden album, recorded in Conny Plank's Studio in Cologne, Germany and released on October 30, 1981. It peaked at #16 in the UK singles chart, #27 in the Irish Singles Chart and #29 in the New Zealand Singles Chart.

Written by the whole band, the song originated from Warren Cann, Chris Cross and Midge Ure, then Billy Currie added an instrumental section in the middle of the song. Cann and Cross provided the vocals in the chorus section.

== Track listings ==
=== 7" vinyl ===
Side one
No.	Title	Length
1.	"The Voice" (single edit)	4:23

Side two
No.	Title	Length
1.	"Paths and Angles"	4:19

=== 12" vinyl ===
Side one
No.	Title	Length
1.	"The Voice"	5:59
2.	"Paths and Angles"	4:19

Side two
No.	Title	Length
1.	"Private Lives" (recorded live at Crystal Palace Bowl, 13 June 1981)	4:51
2.	"All Stood Still" (recorded live at Crystal Palace Bowl, 13 June 1981)	4:19

== Videos ==
There were two different videos made for the single. One has the band miming a performance in a slanted room; the band members appear to be standing at an unnatural angle. The other video is more elaborate, contains war imagery, single-word slogans in knock-out text, features Billy Currie appearing as a radio announcer, and Midge Ure as a soldier. The Voice, was the fourth and final music video directed by Russell Mulcahy that was included on the Ultravox The Collection video compilation. Midge Ure and Chris Cross continued to direct Ultravox next music videos.

== Live performances ==
Live versions of the song appear on the live albums Monument and Return to Eden.
