= Awaydays =

- Theatrical release poster
- Directed by: Pat Holden
- Written by: Kevin Sampson
- Produced by: David A. Hughes
- Starring: Stephen Graham; Nicky Bell; Liam Boyle; Oliver Lee; Lee Battle; Sean Ward; Michael Ryan; Ian Puleston-Davies; Holliday Granger; Sacha Parkinson; Samantha McCarthy
- Cinematography: Tony Mitchell
- Edited by: Mark Elliot
- Music by: David A. Hughes
- Distributed by: Optimum Releasing
- Release date: 22 May 2009
- Running time: 105 minutes
- Country: United Kingdom
- Language: English

Awaydays is a 2009 British crime drama film directed by Pat Holden and starring Nicky Bell, Liam Boyle and Stephen Graham. It is based on the novel of the same name by Kevin Sampson that was published in 1998. The film follows Paul Carty, a 19-year-old in the aftermath of his mother's death who becomes part of The Pack - a legendary group of football hooligans who dress casual and wear Peter Storm cagoules, carry Stanley knives and follow Tranmere Rovers F.C.

== Plot ==
The film begins in 1979 with Paul Carty (Nicky Bell), with his sister Molly, (Holliday Grainger) and father, at his mother's graveside. After his sister escorts her dad away from the grave, Carty, looking at his watch, starts to run off. Along his way he gets changed into casual clothing and carries on running until he catches a football special train.

Aboard the train, he meets the leader of the football firm, John Godden (Stephen Graham), an ex-soldier who warns him he has no room for runners in his firm and he best stand his ground. When walking through the train, he meets Elvis (Liam Boyle), and Carty reminisces about how they met in a series of flashbacks. We learnt that Carty has always been fascinated by The Pack, observing them at Tranmere games when they fight and trying to dress like them, at which point Baby Millan (Oliver Lee), taunts Carty and threatens him but Elvis leads the other lads away and Carty stands his ground. Carty eventually meets Elvis at a club night and the pair realise they have many things in common from music taste to wanting out of Birkenhead. The pair fantasise about leaving for Berlin. Carty, over their next few meetings, begs Elvis to introduce him to The Pack but Elvis calls them a "gang of pricks" and says Carty does not want to be involved. Eventually, after Carty headbutts a rude sales assistant in a record shop to prove his fighting skills, Elvis gives in and tells him to meet him on the train at 12:00 on Saturday.

It fast-forwards onto the train again, and The Pack are led by Godden to meet a rival firm. Once there, the two groups scrap and Carty is taken over by a thrill as he is embroiled in the fight. Carty returns home and we discover that his sister knows about his fascination with The Pack. The next day, Carty promises to take her shopping for her birthday in Chester. However, after an argument with Elvis when Elvis tells him he is making a "twat out of himself", Carty leaves work to find Elvis there. The pair go for a drink and forget about their argument, and Carty forgets completely about his sister. He promises he will take her out another time the day after, as his mind is firmly on the meet The Pack has when they travel to Wrexham that day. Once there, police attempt to form a barrier between the firms, but Carty breaks through and cuts a Wrexham fan with his Stanley - much to the delight of Godden, who finally accepts him as one of The Pack. Everyone toasts Carty on the train home, except Baby Millan and Elvis who are far from happy about his new status. That night at The Pelican, the HQ and chosen pub of The Pack, Carty is "initiated" with a girl who he takes outside to have sex with. Once out there, Godden warns Baby Millan to not deal heroin to the members of the firm, warning The Pack cannot have any "smackheads". Baby replies "But it's okay for Elvis to do it?", much to the puzzlement of Godden and the rest of the firm. Outside, Carty does not perform well with the girl, and the lads all rib him for this.

Carty and Elvis one night meet two women, Sonia (Rebecca Atkinson) and Jackie on a bus and take them back to Elvis' bohemian-style flat, which has stars on the wall and a noose to remind him of the "certainty of death". Elvis' behaviour becomes erratic as he consumes heroin, and when Carty refuses, Elvis rejects Sonia's advances and plays the guitar instead. Carty, waking up, sees Sonia in the bathroom and the pair have sex. The next day, Elvis and Carty are on their way to another away day when the pair argue in front of Godden. Elvis, taunting Carty's choice of women, is obviously hurt when Carty taunts his performance in bed with the women in front of The Pack. Godden taunts Elvis for taking heroin. Carty tries to apologise to Elvis as the pair walk in front of The Pack, and Carty spots the opposition firm coming towards them. He yells at the firm and urges The Pack to join them - and Godden does, only briefly, before headbutting Carty and telling him he is the leader of The Pack. Carty's reign as a top boy in the firm is over and Elvis is back to his jovial self on the train home as Carty sulks in the corner.

Carty forgets about the Pack for a while and we see him telling his boss, Uncle Bob, that he will go back to college to do his Foundation Course. He spends more time with his sister, and he urges her to go out one night. In a taxi, Carty meets a pretty girl, Natasha (Sacha Parkinson), whom he had previously met in a club. The pair are spending a romantic night in when Carty's sister enters, visibly shaken up. She has been roughed up by a gang of boys and Carty, attempting to sort them out, is beaten up by them too. He recruits the help of Elvis and The Pack (without Godden, who Elvis informs him, has been killed by Baby Millan after a disagreement in The Pelican). The Pack beat up the gang of lads who roughed up Carty's sister, and Carty finds Elvis crying on the waterfront. Carty thanks him and says he owes Elvis one, but Elvis replies Carty does not owe him anything, and tells Carty "He always loved you, Carty".

At Godden's funeral, Carty is sitting in the church after everyone leaves when Elvis enters and asks Carty if he will hear his confession. Carty, confused, agrees. Elvis is seen through the confession booth inhaling what appears to be heroin, and he tells Carty to come away with him to Berlin. Carty, currently enjoying a healthy relationship with his family, tells him he cannot yet. Elvis is upset by this and tells him "He always loved you Carty", meaning himself. Elvis asks Carty for one more away day, before leaving.

At the final away day, Carty is stood on the station platform waiting for Elvis to meet him yet there is no sign of him. He catches the train just in time and as the train pulls away, Elvis is visible sat on top of a bridge overlooking the track, as the train crosses underneath it, the bridge is covered in smoke and once it clears, Elvis has gone, hinting at suicide. Carty is out of place in The Pack without Elvis and after a final meet with a local firm in which Carty does not get involved, he is cut with a knife by Baby Millan, who calls him a "ponce". Carty then turns away from The Pack and walks out of the street, saying "How long had I waited for this day? Out of here. Out of this."

== Soundtrack ==
The soundtrack of Awaydays (released by the Universal Music Group) is pivotal to the film and comprises post-punk and electronic music, appropriate for the film's setting and atmosphere, especially focused on the music of Ultravox and Joy Division.

Track listing

1. Ultravox - Young Savage (2:58)
2. Carty And Elvis in Eric's (0:21)
3. The Rascals - All That Jazz (2:57)
4. Cabaret Voltaire - Nag Nag Nag (4:38)
5. "Sunrise" (0:49)
6. "Liverpool 1979" (1:11)
7. Magazine - The Light Pours Out of Me (4:35)
8. "When We Go To Berlin" (0:58)
9. Ultravox - Slow Motion (3:27)
10. "Wool Stomp" (1:17)
11. The Cure - 10:15 Saturday Night (Home Demo) (4:35)
12. Joy Division - Insight (4:23)
13. "Come And See The Stars" (0:39)
14. "Elvis's Dub" (2:36)
15. "Carty Deflated" (1:48)
16. "Carty's Revenge" (1:07)
17. Echo & the Bunnymen - Going Up (4:01)
18. Carty's Last Awayday (1:27)
19. Ultravox - Just For a Moment (3:12)
20. The Mekons - Where Were You? (2:42)
21. The Jam - When You're Young (3:12)
22. Elvis Costello - Night Rally (2:44)
23. Dalek I - The World (2:28)
24. The Teardrop Explodes - Sleeping Gas (Zoo Version) (4:39)
25. Orchestral Manoeuvres in the Dark - Electricity (3:34)
26. The Human League - Being Boiled (3:51)
27. Wire - I Am the Fly (3:08)
28. Gang Of Four - Damaged Goods (3:29)
