= Retro (EP) =

EP by Ultravox!
- Released: February 10, 1978
- Genres: Glam rock; post-punk; new wave
- Label: Island
- Producers: Ultravox!; Steve Lillywhite

Ultravox! chronology
Ha! Ha! Ha! (1977)	Retro (1978)	Systems of Romance (1978)

Retro was the only EP (7") by Ultravox, then Ultravox!, released on February 10, 1978. It was the last recording released by the band as Ultravox!. Also this was the last disc featuring original guitarist Stevie Shears, who left the band after its release.

The EP featured four live tracks recorded in 1977 or early 1978, while Ultravox! were promoting one of their first two albums, Ultravox! and Ha! Ha! Ha!, both released in 1977. An Australian only 12" was also released with the added tracks Quirks and Modern Love. These were previously available as a free 7" single given away with the first 10,000 copies of Ha! Ha! Ha!. In or around 1990 the Australian record company 'Festival Records' made a limited amount of cd singles of the 6 track Retro EP but shelved the release. It is not known if any were issued for sale.

In 2006, Island Records re-released the tracks, adding them to remastered versions of Ultravox!'s albums. The tracks from side two of the EP were included on the reissue of Ultravox! and the side one tracks on the reissue of Ha! Ha! Ha!.

== Track listing ==
All tracks written by Ultravox!

=== A-Side ===
1. The Man Who Dies Every Day (Live at Huddersfield Polytechnic)
2. Young Savage (Live at the Marquee)

=== B-Side ===
1. The Wild, The Beautiful and the Damned (Live at the Rainbow)
2. My Sex (Live at Huddersfield Polytechnic)

== Personnel ==
- John Foxx — vocals
- Stevie Shears — guitars
- Chris Cross — bass guitar
- Billy Currie — keyboards and violin
- Warren Cann — drums
