= The Thin Wall =

Single by Ultravox

from the album Rage in Eden
- B-side: "I Never Wanted to Begin"
- Released: August 14, 1981
- Recorded: 1981 at Conny’s Studio in Cologne, West Germany
- Genre: Synth-pop
- Length: 4:25 (single edit); 5:39 (album version)
- Label: Chrysalis
- Songwriters: Warren Cann; Chris Cross; Billy Currie; Midge Ure
- Producers: Ultravox; Conny Plank

Ultravox singles chronology
"All Stood Still" (1981)	"The Thin Wall" (1981)	"The Voice" (1981)

"The Thin Wall" is a song by British new wave band Ultravox, released in 1981 as the lead single from their fifth studio album Rage in Eden. It was recorded in Conny Plank's Studio in Cologne, Germany and released on Chrysalis Records on August 14, 1981.

The music video, directed by Russell Mulcahy, features Midge Ure struggling to cope among strange and nightmarish imagery, similar to a haunted house setting, while the other band members seemingly plot his demise.

It peaked at No. 14 on the UK Singles Chart.

== Track listings ==
=== 7" vinyl ===
Side one
No.	Title	Length
1.	"The Thin Wall" (single edit)	4:25

Side two
No.	Title	Length
1.	"I Never Wanted to Begin"	3:31

=== 12" vinyl ===
Side one
No.	Title	Length
1.	"The Thin Wall"	5:39

Side two
No.	Title	Length
1.	"I Never Wanted to Begin" (12" version)	6:17

== Chart performance ==
Chart (1981)	Peak position
UK Singles Chart	14
Australian Singles Chart	95
Irish Singles Chart	16
