= Rare, Vol. 2 =

Compilation album by Ultravox
- Released: August 8, 1994
- Recorded: 1983–1986
- Genres: Synthpop, electronic
- Label: Chrysalis Records
- Producer: Ultravox

Ultravox chronology
| Rare, Vol. 1 (1993) | Rare, Vol. 2 (1994) | Ingenuity (1994) |

Professional ratings
Review scores
| Source | Rating |
|---|---|
| AllMusic | 2.5/5 stars |

Rare, Vol. 2 is the second of two B-side compilation albums by Ultravox. This release chronicles the B-sides of the era 1983-1986, encompassing releases from the albums Lament and U-Vox. The album includes almost all B-side releases throughout this period with the exception of the non-album single "Love's Great Adventure", that was previously included in 1984's The Collection.

The album reflects the change in direction for Ultravox c. 1984 as they began to experiment more with remixes and alternate versions of their songs. There are much less original b-side songs on Rare, Vol. 2 than Vol. 1 as most are instrumentals or remixes of a-side tracks.

Like Vol. 1, the tracks are in chronological order of their release except for the final two tracks, which are remixed A-sides that weren't necessarily available in all areas. "Heart Of The Country (Special 12" Remix)" was only released in Germany, while the "Final Mix" of "One Small Day" was on a special 12" remix compilation available with certain editions of The Collection.

== Track listing ==
| No. | Title | Other releases | Length |
|---|---|---|---|
| 1. | "Easterly" | Lament Super Deluxe Edition | 3:51 |
| 2. | "Building" | Lament Super Deluxe Edition | 3:14 |
| 3. | "Heart of the Country (Instrumental)" | Lament Super Deluxe Edition | 4:27 |
| 4. | "White China (Live)" | Lament Super Deluxe Edition | 3:45 |
| 5. | "Man of Two Worlds (Instrumental)" | Lament Super Deluxe Edition | 4:34 |
| 6. | "3" | U-Vox Remastered Definitive Edition | 4:02 |
| 7. | "All in One Day (Instrumental)" | U-Vox Remastered Definitive Edition | 6:15 |
| 8. | "Dreams?" | U-Vox Remastered Definitive Edition | 2:32 |
| 9. | "All Fall Down (Instrumental)" | U-Vox Remastered Definitive Edition | 5:37 |
| 10. | "All Fall Down (Live)" | U-Vox Remastered Definitive Edition | 5:38 |
| 11. | "Dream On (Live)" | U-Vox Remastered Definitive Edition | 3:49 |
| 12. | "The Prize (Live)" | U-Vox Remastered Definitive Edition | 4:58 |
| 13. | "Stateless" | U-Vox Remastered Definitive Edition | 2:54 |
| 14. | "Heart of the Country (Special 12" Remix)" | Lament Super Deluxe Edition | 11:06 |
| 15. | "One Small Day (Final Mix)" | Lament Super Deluxe Edition | 7:36 |
