= The Collection (Ultravox album) =

1984 greatest hits album by Ultravox

Greatest hits album by Ultravox
- Released: November 2, 1984
- Recorded: 1980–1984
- Genres: Synth-pop; rock
- Length: 56:51
- Label: Chrysalis
- Producers: Ultravox; George Martin; Conny Plank

Ultravox chronology
Lament (1984)	The Collection (1984)	U-Vox (1986)

Singles from The Collection
- 1. "Love's Great Adventure" Released: October 12, 1984

Professional ratings
Review scores
Source	Rating
AllMusic	4.5/5 stars

The Collection is a greatest hits album by British band Ultravox, released on November 2, 1984 on LP and cassette by Chrysalis Records, followed by compact disc on March 11, 1985. It includes all fourteen of the band's hit singles on Chrysalis from 1980 to 1984, including "Love's Great Adventure", released ahead of the album on October 12, 1984 as a stand-alone single.

The album peaked at number 2 on the UK Album Chart, becoming their highest-charting album. It also became their best-selling album, being certified triple platinum by the British Phonographic Industry (BPI) for shipments in excess of 900,000 copies.

== Track listing ==
All titles written by Cann/Cross/Currie/Ure.

Side one
No.	Title	From album	Length
1.	"Dancing with Tears in My Eyes"	Lament	4:10
2.	"Hymn"	Quartet	4:24
3.	"The Thin Wall"	Rage in Eden	4:25
4.	"The Voice"	Rage in Eden	4:23
5.	"Vienna"	Vienna	4:37
6.	"Passing Strangers"	Vienna	3:48
7.	"Sleepwalk"	Vienna	3:10

Side two
No.	Title	From album	Length
1.	"Reap the Wild Wind"	Quartet	3:41
2.	"All Stood Still"	Vienna	3:40
3.	"Visions in Blue"	Quartet	4:13
4.	"We Came to Dance"	Quartet	4:05
5.	"One Small Day"	Lament	4:33
6.	"Love's Great Adventure"	Previously unreleased	3:04
7.	"Lament"	Lament	4:17

=== The 12″ Collection ===
Initial copies of the vinyl album included a limited-edition bonus disc titled The 12″ Collection, consisting of three extended remixes and three 12″ extended mixes:

Side one
No.	Title	Length
1.	"Dancing with Tears in My Eyes" (Special Re-mix)	10:02
2.	"Serenade" (Special Re-mix)	6:03
3.	"One Small Day" (Final Mix)	7:45

Side two
No.	Title	Length
1.	"Love's Great Adventure" (Extended Version)	5:40
2.	"We Came to Dance" (Extended Version)	7:35
3.	"Reap the Wild Wind" (Extended Version)	4:45

Initial copies of the cassette tape release also included these additional six tracks; three located at the end of each side.

== Charts ==
=== Weekly charts ===
Weekly chart performance for The Collection
Chart (1984–1985)	Peak position
Australian Albums (Kent Music Report)	14
Canada Top Albums/CDs (RPM)	93
European Albums (Eurotipsheet)	17
German Albums (Offizielle Top 100)	37
Italian Albums (Musica e dischi)	12
New Zealand Albums (RMNZ)	2
Swedish Albums (Sverigetopplistan)	45
UK Albums (Official Charts)	2

Chart (2025)	Peak position
German Pop Albums (Offizielle Top 100)	4

=== Year-end charts ===
1984 year-end chart performance for The Collection
Chart (1984)	Position
UK Albums (Gallup)	11

1985 year-end chart performance for The Collection
Chart (1985)	Position
Australian Albums (Kent Music Report)	80
New Zealand Albums (RMNZ)	29
UK Albums (Gallup)	41

== Certifications ==
Certifications for The Collection
Region	Certification	Certified units/sales
New Zealand (RMNZ)	Platinum	15,000^{^}
United Kingdom (BPI)	3× Platinum	900,000^{^}
^{^} Shipments figures based on certification alone.
