= ROckWrok =

Single by Ultravox!

from the album Ha! Ha! Ha!
- B-side: "Hiroshima Mon Amour" (alternate version)
- Released: October 7, 1977
- Recorded: 1977
- Genre: New wave; post-punk
- Length: 3:33
- Label: Island
- Songwriter: John Foxx
- Producer: Ultravox!

Ultravox! singles chronology
"Young Savage" (1977)	"ROckWrok" (1977)	"Quirks" (1978)

"ROckWrok" is a single by the post-punk band Ultravox!, released by Island Records on October 7, 1977. It was the last British non-free single (the next, "Quirks", came free along with initial copies of the album) released from the Ha! Ha! Ha! album and featuring Stevie Shears as guitarist. The next non-free single was "Frozen Ones", released only in Germany shortly afterwards.

"ROckWrok" features a punk sound derived from Warren Cann's drums and Stevie Shears' guitar alongside John Foxx's hard vocals. It was regularly performed live until Ultravox's U.S. and Canadian tour in 1979, when Foxx decided to go solo. The song was performed live by Massive Attack on their 2019 tour. They had previously sampled "ROckWrok" for their 1998 song "Inertia Creeps".

The B-side is an early version or demo, or alternate version of "Hiroshima Mon Amour" (named after the famous French movie), written by John Foxx and Billy Currie. It has a punkier sound than the album version of the song. A third version of the song was performed live on The Old Grey Whistle Test the next year, with Robin Simon replacing Shears as guitarist; it was quieter than the "ROckWrok" single version but maintained the rock style, also differing from the synthpop oriented version on Ha! Ha! Ha!.

This single, like all the Ha! Ha! Ha!-era releases, did not perform well in the charts.

== Track listing ==
7" version

1. "ROckWrok" – 3:33
2. "Hiroshima Mon Amour" – 4:54

== Personnel ==
- John Foxx – vocals
- Chris Cross – bass, vocals
- Stevie Shears – guitar
- Warren Cann – drums, vocals
- Billy Currie – keyboards, synthesizer, violin
