= Love's Great Adventure =

Single by Ultravox

from the album The Collection
- B-side: "White China" (live); "Man of Two Worlds" (instrumental)
- Released: October 12, 1984
- Recorded: 1984
- Genre: Synth-pop; new wave
- Length: 3:04; 5:40 (extended version)
- Label: Chrysalis
- Songwriters: Warren Cann; Chris Cross; Billy Currie; Midge Ure
- Producer: Ultravox

Ultravox singles chronology
"Lament" (1984)	"Love's Great Adventure" (1984)	"Same Old Story" (1986)

"Love's Great Adventure" is a song by Ultravox, released as a single on October 12, 1984. Having enjoyed massive radio airplay that autumn, the single became Ultravox's thirteenth top 30 single in Britain, and was their last major hit in the UK, peaking at No. 12 on the UK Singles Chart.

== Background ==
Unhappy to release another single from their recent album Lament, Billy Currie said in 1984 that the band wanted to do something different and do a one-off single totally separate from any album, recorded in a more immediate way than Lament.

The song was not released on a studio album, instead appearing on their 1984 compilation album The Collection. 40 years later the track was finally included on Lament when the 40th Anniversary Deluxe Edition of the album was released.

== In popular culture ==
An episode of the BBC series Inside No. 9, also called "Love's Great Adventure", used this song as its closing theme.

== Track listing ==
=== 7" version ===
1. "Love's Great Adventure" – 3:04
2. "White China" (live June 84 at Hammersmith Odeon) – 3:43

=== 12" version ===
1. "Love's Great Adventure" (extended version) – 5:40
2. "White China" (live June 84 at Hammersmith Odeon) – 3:43
3. "Man of Two Worlds" (instrumental) – 4:32
