= Rare, Vol. 1 =

Compilation album by Ultravox
- Released: October 11, 1993
- Recorded: 1980–1983
- Genres: Synthpop, electronic
- Label: Chrysalis Records
- Producer: Ultravox

Ultravox chronology
Revelation (1993)	Rare, Vol. 1 (1993)	Rare, Vol. 2 (1994)

Rare, Vol. 1 is the first of two B-side compilation albums by Ultravox. This release chronicles the B-sides of the singles from 1980 to 1983, spanning the Vienna, Rage in Eden and Quartet albums. Rare includes all B-side tracks throughout this period, with the exception of "I Never Wanted To Begin (12" Version)" which can be found at the end of the remastered Rage In Eden CD.

Despite its name, it has been relatively easy to acquire the songs on this release over the years. Many of the tracks on Rare, Vol. 1 have been re-released on remastered CD versions of their respective albums, but the album nonetheless still remains an exclusive source for several songs, most notably the various live tracks on this release.

== Track listing ==
No.	Title	Other releases	Length
1.	"Waiting"	Vienna 40th Anniversary Deluxe Edition	3.54
2.	"Face to Face (Live)"	Vienna 40th Anniversary Deluxe Edition	6.04
3.	"King's Lead Hat (Live)"	Vienna 40th Anniversary Deluxe Edition	4.06
4.	"Passionate Reply"	Vienna 40th Anniversary Deluxe Edition	4.18
5.	"Herr X"	Vienna 40th Anniversary Deluxe Edition	5.50
6.	"Alles Klar"	Vienna 40th Anniversary Deluxe Edition	4.54
7.	"Keep Talking"	Vienna 40th Anniversary Deluxe Edition	6.23
8.	"I Never Wanted to Begin"	Rage in Eden Remastered Definitive Edition	3.32
9.	"Paths and Angels"	Rage in Eden Remastered Definitive Edition	4.21
10.	"Private Lives (Live)"	Rage in Eden Remastered Definitive Edition	4.52
11.	"All Stood Still (Live)"	Rage in Eden Remastered Definitive Edition	4.21
12.	"Hosanna (In Excelsis Deo)"	Quartet Deluxe Edition	4.22
13.	"Monument"	Quartet Deluxe Edition	3.16
14.	"The Thin Wall (Live)"	Quartet Deluxe Edition	5.56
15.	"Break Your Back"	Quartet Deluxe Edition	3.28
16.	"Reap the Wild Wind (Live)"	Quartet Deluxe Edition	3.57
17.	"Overlook"	Quartet Deluxe Edition	4.04
