= Ingenuity (album) =

Studio album by Ultravox
- Released: November 10, 1994
- Recorded: 1994
- Studios: The Stone Room, London
- Genre: Pop rock
- Labels: Resurgence; Intercord (Germany)
- Producers: Billy Currie; Charlie Francis

Ultravox chronology
| Rare, Vol. 2 (1994) | Ingenuity (1994) | Dancing with Tears in My Eyes (1995) |

Singles from Ingenuity
- 1. "There Goes a Beautiful World" Released: 1994

Professional ratings
Review scores
| Source | Rating |
|---|---|
| AllMusic | 2/5 stars |

Ingenuity is the tenth studio album by Ultravox, released in 1994 with Sam Blue as lead vocalist amongst a new five-piece line-up (with Billy Currie the only remaining original member). The album was re-released in 2001 by Puzzle Records with a different cover.

== Track listing ==
All songs written by Sam Blue, Vinny Burns, Billy Currie, Tony Holmes, and Gary Williams.

1. "Ingenuity" – 4.44
2. "There Goes a Beautiful World" – 4:10
3. "Give It All Back" – 4:21
4. "Future Picture Forever" – 4.17
5. "The Silent Cries" – 4.14
6. "Distance" – 3.51
7. "Ideals" – 4.12
8. "Who'll Save You" – 6.36
9. "A Way Out. A Way Through." – 4.07
10. "Majestic" – 4.18

== Personnel ==
Ultravox

- Sam Blue – lead vocals
- Vinny Burns – guitar
- Billy Currie – keyboards, viola, production
- Tony Holmes – drums
- Gary Williams – bass
