= Monument (Ultravox album) =

Monument the Soundtrack

Live album by Ultravox
- Released: October 14, 1983
- Recorded: December 4–7, 1982
- Venue: Hammersmith Odeon (London)
- Genres: Rock; electronic
- Length: 45:00
- Label: Chrysalis
- Producer: John Hudson

Ultravox chronology
Quartet (1982)	Monument the Soundtrack (1983)	Lament (1984)

Professional ratings
Review scores
Source	Rating
Allmusic	3.5/5 stars

Monument the Soundtrack, released on October 14, 1983, is a live album by the British band Ultravox. It is the soundtrack to the live video titled, "Monument", recorded at the London Hammersmith Odeon during the band's 1982 "Monument" tour. The album peaked at No.9 on the UK album chart and was certified Gold by the BPI in January 1984 for 100,000 copies sold.

The opening instrumental title track is not live and is identical to the version found on the B-side of the "Hymn" single.

The album was re-issued on CD in 1999 and was expanded, containing all of the songs from the video (but still not the entire concert), and released again in 2009, as a CD/DVD package together.

== Track listing ==
All songs written by Warren Cann, Chris Cross, Billy Currie, and Midge Ure.

Original track listing from UK first release

=== Side one ===
1. "Monument" - 3:15
2. "Reap the Wild Wind" [Live] – 4:11
3. "The Voice" [Live] - 6:54

=== Side two ===
1. "Vienna" [Live] - 5:24
2. "Mine For Life" [Live] - 4:40
3. "Hymn" [Live] - 5:40

=== Track listing from 1999 UK CD re-issue ===
1. "Monument" - 3:15
2. "Reap the Wild Wind" [Live] – 4:10
3. "Visions In Blue" [Live] - 4:38
4. "The Voice" [Live] - 6:51
5. "Vienna" [Live] - 5:23
6. "Passing Strangers" [Live] - 5:28
7. "Mine For Life" [Live] - 4:25
8. "Hymn" [Live] - 5:40

=== CD track listing from 2009 UK CD/DVD re-issue ===
1. "Monument" - 3:15
2. "Reap the Wild Wind" [Live] – 4:10
3. "Visions In Blue" [Live] - 4:41
4. "The Voice" [Live] - 6:50
5. "Vienna" [Live] - 5:23
6. "Passing Strangers" [Live] - 5:12
7. "Mine For Life" [Live] - 4:38
8. "Hymn" [Live] - 5:46
9. "The Song (We Go)" [Live] - 5:12

=== DVD track listing from 2009 UK CD/DVD re-issue ===
1. "Introduction"
2. "Reap The Wild Wind [Live]"
3. "The Voice [Live]"
4. "Vienna [Live]"
5. "Mine For Life [Live]"
6. "Hymn [Live]"
7. "End Credits"

== Personnel ==
On Stage:

- Warren Cann — drums, backing vocals
- Chris Cross — bass, synthesizer, backing vocals
- Billy Currie — keyboards, violin
- Midge Ure — guitar, keyboards, lead vocals
- Messengers (Danny Mitchell, Colin King) — keyboards, backing vocals

Additional personnel

- John Hudson — producer
- Brian Cooke — photography
