= Rage in Eden =

Studio album by Ultravox
- Released: September 11, 1981
- Recorded: 1981
- Studio: Conny's Studio (Cologne)
- Genres: New wave; synth-pop; art rock; new romantic
- Length: 45:34
- Label: Chrysalis
- Producers: Ultravox; Conny Plank

Ultravox chronology
Vienna (1980)	Rage in Eden (1981)	Quartet (1982)

Singles from Rage in Eden
- 1. "The Thin Wall" Released: August 14, 1981; 2. "The Voice" Released: October 30, 1981

Alternative cover
- Used for the EMI Gold compact disc reissue (CDGOLD 1097), September 15, 1997.

Professional ratings
Review scores
Source	Rating
AllMusic	3.5/5 stars
Release Magazine	9/10 stars
Smash Hits	5/10 stars

Rage in Eden is the fifth studio album by British new wave band Ultravox, released on September 11, 1981 through Chrysalis Records. The album reached #4 in the UK album charts and was certified Gold by the BPI for sales in excess of 100,000 copies.

== Content ==
The album continues the electronic new wave style the band had developed on their previous two albums Systems of Romance and Vienna, but has a more complex and introspective sound. The album includes several lengthy tracks and the last three tracks are interconnected to one long sequence. The lyrics to the songs feature obscure and surreal imagery. The chorus of the title track "Rage in Eden" is the chorus of "I Remember (Death in the Afternoon)" played backwards.

== Background ==
Like the band's previous two albums, Rage in Eden was co-produced by Conny Plank. It was recorded at his studio in Cologne, West Germany. It took Ultravox three months to record the album, and unlike the Vienna album, the members had not written any material before they went into the studio.

Cann said about the recording 2009:

We used the success to give us the opportunity. We knew it was a great position to be in – to have a hit record behind us giving us a bit of clout, so we decided to really stick our necks out and do something we always wanted to do, which was to not be well prepared before we went in the studio, but use the studio fully as an instrument to make ‘Rage In Eden’. One day we were working on 'Death in the Afternoon' and during the course of doing something backwards, we heard some backing vocals for the chorus in reverse. Backwards it sounded fantastic, like another language or a chant or whatever. It gave us an idea - we copied the backwards sound to a fresh reel of multitrack running the right way. From there we built up the song 'Rage in Eden'.

The abstract album artwork, based on Hervé Morvan's Cinemonde artwork, was designed by Peter Saville, known for his collaborations with New Order. All re-issues of the album since 1981, however, have different artwork, due to licensing problems concerning the original cover.

The remastered definitive edition, released on 22 September 2008, features a second disc containing rare and previously unreleased material. In addition to this, the original front cover artwork has been reinstated. The licensing of the original artwork currently only extends as far as the initial run of the physical release of the album (set at ten thousand copies worldwide). Future editions feature the same artwork as used on the previous CD re-issue.

Midge Ure said about the album: "I think 'Rage in Eden' was always one of my favourite albums. There's a starkness about it, an austere, mystical distance, a coldness to it but a coldness that kind of works."

== Track listing ==
All songs written by Warren Cann, Chris Cross, Billy Currie, and Midge Ure.

Original release: CHR 1338

Side A:

1. "The Voice" – 6:01
2. "We Stand Alone" – 5:39
3. "Rage in Eden" – 4:12
4. "I Remember (Death in the Afternoon)" – 4:57

Side B:

1. "The Thin Wall" – 5:39
2. "Stranger Within" – 7:26
3. "Accent on Youth" – 5:57
4. "The Ascent" – 1:10
5. "Your Name (Has Slipped My Mind Again)" – 4:29

Original CD release: 253 958

1. "The Voice" – 6:00
2. "We Stand Alone" – 5:40
3. "Rage in Eden" – 4:13
4. "I Remember (Death in the Afternoon)" – 4:59
5. "The Thin Wall" – 5:41
6. "Stranger Within" – 7:26
7. "Accent on Youth" – 5:57
8. "The Ascent" – 1:07
9. "Your Name (Has Slipped My Mind Again)" – 4:30

CD re-release: 7243 8 57409 2 3

1. "The Voice" – 6:01
2. "We Stand Alone" – 5:39
3. "Rage in Eden" – 4:12
4. "I Remember (Death in the Afternoon)" – 4:57
5. "The Thin Wall" – 5:39
6. "Stranger Within" – 7:26
7. "Accent on Youth" – 4:45
8. "The Ascent" – 2:19
9. "Your Name (Has Slipped My Mind Again)" – 4:29

Bonus tracks:

10. "I Never Wanted to Begin" – 3:31
11. "Paths and Angles" – 4:19
12. "I Never Wanted to Begin (Extended Version)" – 6:17

=== Remastered Definitive Edition ===
Disc One

1. "The Voice" – 6:01
2. "We Stand Alone" – 5:39
3. "Rage in Eden" – 4:12
4. "I Remember (Death in the Afternoon)" – 4:57
5. "The Thin Wall" – 5:39
6. "Stranger Within" – 7:26
7. "Accent on Youth" – 4:45
8. "The Ascent" – 2:19
9. "Your Name (Has Slipped My Mind Again)" – 4:29

Disc Two

1. "I Never Wanted to Begin" (B-side of The Thin Wall) – 3:31
2. "Paths and Angles" (B-side of The Voice) – 4:19
3. "I Never Wanted to Begin (Extended Version)" – 6:17
4. "Private Lives (Live)" – 4:51
5. "All Stood Still (Live)" – 4:19
6. "I Remember (Death in the Afternoon) (Live)" – 5:47
7. "Stranger Within (Live)" – 8:02
8. "Rage in Eden (Live)" – 4:26
9. "Accent on Youth (Live)" – 4:45
10. "The Ascent (Live)" – 2:27
11. "Your Name (Has Slipped My Mind Again) (Live)" – 4:45
12. "Stranger Within (Work in Progress Mix)" – 7:11
13. "The Thin Wall (Work in Progress Mix)" – 5:16
- Tracks 4–5 recorded live at Crystal Palace, 13 June 1981.
- Tracks 4–5 originally released as B-sides to the 12" version of "The Voice".
- Tracks 6–11 recorded live at Hammersmith Odeon, 17 October 1981.
- Tracks 6–13 previously unreleased.

== Personnel ==
Ultravox

- Warren Cann – drums, electronic percussion, vocals, (lead vocals on "Paths and Angles")
- Chris Cross – bass, synthesizers, vocals, (guitar on "Paths and Angles")
- Billy Currie – synthesizers, piano, violin, viola
- Midge Ure – lead vocals, guitars, synthesizers (except "Paths and Angles")

Additional personnel

- Conny Plank – co-production, engineering
- Peter Saville Associates – original sleeve design

== Charts ==
Chart (1981–82)	Peak position
Australian Albums (Kent Music Report)	20
Canada Top Albums/CDs (RPM)	45
Dutch Albums (Album Top 100)	29
German Albums (Offizielle Top 100)	48
New Zealand Albums (RMNZ)	4
Norwegian Albums (VG-lista)	20
Swedish Albums (Sverigetopplistan)	5
UK Albums (Official Charts)	4
US Billboard 200	144

Chart (2022)	Peak position
Scottish Albums (Official Charts)	11
UK Independent Albums (Official Charts)	6

== Certifications ==
Region	Certification	Certified units/sales
Australia (ARIA)	Gold	20,000^{^}
New Zealand (RMNZ)	Gold	7,500^{^}
United Kingdom (BPI)	Gold	100,000^{^}
^{^} Shipments figures based on certification alone.
