= Revelation (Ultravox album) =

Studio album by Ultravox
- Released: May 10, 1993 (UK)
- Recorded: 1993
- Studios: Master Rock Studios and Berwick Street Studios, London, UK
- Genre: Synth-pop
- Length: 45:43
- Label: DSB
- Producers: Rod Gammons; Ultravox

Ultravox chronology
U-Vox (1986)	Revelation (1993)	Rare, Vol. 1 (1993)

Singles from Revelation
- 1. "I Am Alive" Released: March 1993 Released: May 24, 1993 (UK)

Professional ratings
Review scores
Source	Rating
AllMusic	1.5/5 stars

Revelation is the ninth studio album by British new wave rock band Ultravox, released in 1993. The album was issued after the dissolution of the band in 1988 and the reformation of a new line-up in 1992, with Tony Fenelle as lead vocalist/guitarist and keyboard player Billy Currie as the only original member left.

== Track listing ==
No.	Title	Writer(s)	Length
1.	"I Am Alive"	Billy Currie, Tony Fenelle, Rod Gammons	4.56
2.	"Revelation"	Currie, Fenelle, Gammons	4.06
3.	"Systems of Love"	Currie, Fenelle, Gammons	4.32
4.	"Perfecting the Art of Common Ground"	Currie, Fenelle, Gerry Laffy	5.17
5.	"The Great Outdoors"	Currie, Fenelle	4.12
6.	"The Closer I Get to You"	Currie, Fenelle	4.13
7.	"No Turning Back"	Currie, Fenelle	4.21
8.	"True Believer"	Currie, Fenelle, Gammons	4.56
9.	"Unified"	Currie, Fenelle	4.27
10.	"The New Frontier"	Currie, Fenelle, Gammons	4.43

== Personnel ==
Ultravox

- Billy Currie – synthesizer, keyboards, drum machine, viola, violin
- Tony Fenelle – guitars, lead vocals

Additional musicians

- Gerry Laffy – additional guitars on tracks 1 and 7
- Neal Wilkinson – drums on tracks 1 and 4
- Jackie Williams – background vocals on tracks 2 and 3
- Richard Niles – conductor, string arrangements on tracks 1 and 10

Production

- Rod Gammons – producer, engineer, programming, mixing on track 3
- Jonathan Garfield – assistant recording engineer
- Mike Bigwood – strings recording engineer
- Graham Bonnet – mixing on tracks 1, 4–8, 10
- Rupert Coulson – mixing on track 2
- Dave Ford – mixing on track 9
- Dave Chelsea – assistant engineer
- Jack Adams – mastering at The Hit Factory, London
