= Systems of Romance =

Studio album by Ultravox
- Released: September 8, 1978
- Recorded: 1978
- Studios: Conny's Studio in Cologne, West Germany
- Genres: New wave; post-punk; synth-pop; art rock
- Length: 36:09
- Label: Island
- Producers: Conny Plank; Ultravox; Dave Hutchins

Ultravox chronology
Retro (1978)	Systems of Romance (1978)	Three into One (1980)

Singles from Systems Of Romance
- 1. "Slow Motion" Released: August 11, 1978; 2. "Quiet Men" Released: October 20, 1978

Systems of Romance, released by Island Records on September 8, 1978, is the third studio album by British new wave band Ultravox (an exclamation mark having been dropped from the name earlier in the year). It was the final recording for the group with original lead singer, lyricist and co-composer John Foxx, and their first album without guitarist Stevie Shears, who had left the band. Shears was replaced by Robin Simon, making his first and only appearance on an Ultravox album. Though not a commercial success, Systems of Romance had a significant influence on the electropop music that came after it.

== Production and style ==
Co-produced by Conny Plank and Dave Hutchins, Systems of Romance featured the band's heaviest use of electronics to date. More new wave orientated than the glam- and punk-influenced tunes that characterised their first two albums, Ultravox! and Ha! Ha! Ha!, its style was partly inspired by German band Kraftwerk, whose first four albums were produced by Plank. Among Ultravox's own repertoire, antecedents included Billy Currie's distinctive synthesizer work on "The Man Who Dies Every Day" and the romantic balladry of "Hiroshima Mon Amour", both from Ha! Ha! Ha!.

The opening song, "Slow Motion", was indicative of the band's direction on the new album. It is noted for its advanced production for the time, having featured a multi effects pedal guitar sound and also synthesizer bass replacing conventional bass, as on various other of the album's songs. The song also featured a number of rich synthesizer parts throughout the piece rather than simply a discreet solo or special effect. For drummer Warren Cann, "it perfectly represented our amalgamation of rock and synthesizer, many of the ideas and aspirations we had for our music gelled in that song".

The subject matter of "Quiet Men" grew out of an alternate persona developed by John Foxx, 'The Quiet Man', who embodied detachment and observation. Musically, like the earlier "Hiroshima Mon Amour", the track dispensed with conventional drums in favour of a Roland TR-77 rhythm box. "Dislocation" and "Just for a Moment" eschewed all acoustic and synthetic drums, relying on treated ARP Odyssey sounds for their percussive effects. The former song was imbued with a heavy proto-industrial flavour; the latter featured church-like vocal and keyboard effects that would be echoed on Foxx's second solo album, The Garden. "When You Walk Through Me" displayed psychedelic touches that Foxx also developed in his solo career; Cann later admitted to lifting its beat from The Beatles' "Tomorrow Never Knows". "Some of Them" was one of the few tracks that harked back to the band's previous hard rock sound.

== Title ==
The title Systems of Romance was inspired by Conny Plank's interest in systems music and his systems of recording, and by mathematical structures found in certain paintings, literature and music. "I liked the idea of intangible emotional elements running through mathematical frameworks", John Foxx later said. "It seemed a perfect encapsulation of the spirit of the music I was attempting to get to at that moment." A song of the same title was not included on the album, but later recorded by John Foxx for his 1981 album The Garden.

== Release and aftermath ==
Professional ratings
Review scores
Source	Rating
AllMusic	3.5/5 stars
Christgau's Record Guide	B+
Record Mirror	4/5 stars
Sounds	4/5 stars
Uncut	8/10

The album's September 1978 release was book-ended by two singles, "Slow Motion" in August and "Quiet Men" in October. Like Ultravox's previous albums, Systems of Romance received mixed reviews at the time and failed to chart.

The reviews in the British music press were mixed. One supportive writer in NME celebrated Ultravox "new sound" described as "crisp, clean, digital, slightly mechanical, yet showing an inchoative eroticism", while Ian Penman in another edition of the same magazine wrote: "Forget the Pere Ubu/Bowie/Kraftwerk etc comparisons - next to Ultravox they're the difference between insights and platitudes." In a positive review, John Gill at Sounds gave the album a four out of five rating: "Whatever anyone says, Ultravox (sans"!") have always been that important step ahead of fashion... Personally I don't think it's their best (album) but the deftly alienating production and the tricky use of electronics make it an important enough development in the career of a band that always aims for the unusual". Systems of Romance sold over 20 000 copies on its release, but neither the album nor the singles entered the charts.

The band was eventually dropped by their label Island Records just weeks after they had made a performance on The Old Grey Whistle Test and prior to a 1979 tour of the US. During the tour Foxx, tired of rows with other members, and of being in a group, announced his intention to leave Ultravox when he returned to England. Guitarist Robin Simon also left, electing to stay in New York City. Chris Cross, Billy Currie and Warren Cann worked on other projects while recruiting a new lead singer/guitarist (Midge Ure). This line-up of Ultravox played their final concert together in Los Angeles in March 1979.

== Influence ==
Systems of Romance has been cited as a major influence on the synthpop music scene of the late 1970s and early 1980s. It was the sonic prototype for the re-formed Ultravox featuring Midge Ure who, in his own words, "loved that album". John Foxx's first record as a solo artist was the almost fully electronic Metamatic, however, his next release, The Garden, took Systems of Romance as its starting point, to the extent of re-recording the earlier album's previously unpublished title song, utilising Robin Simon on guitar. Gary Numan, himself often called the "godfather of electropop", described the record as his single biggest musical inspiration; he invited Billy Currie to tour with him in 1979 and contribute to his album The Pleasure Principle, prior to Ultravox's second incarnation.

== Track listing ==
No.	Title	Writer(s)	Length
1.	"Slow Motion"	Warren Cann, Chris Cross, Billy Currie, John Foxx, Robin Simon	3:29
2.	"I Can't Stay Long"	Cann, Cross, Currie, Foxx, Simon	4:16
3.	"Someone Else's Clothes"	Currie, Foxx	4:25
4.	"Blue Light"	Cann, Cross, Currie, Foxx, Simon	3:09
5.	"Some of Them"	Currie, Foxx	2:29
6.	"Quiet Men"	Cross, Currie, Foxx	4:08
7.	"Dislocation"	Currie, Foxx	2:55
8.	"Maximum Acceleration"	Foxx	3:53
9.	"When You Walk Through Me"	Currie, Foxx, Simon	4:15
10.	"Just for a Moment"	Currie, Foxx	3:10

2006 reissue bonus tracks
No.	Title	Writer(s)	Length
11.	"Cross Fade"	Cann, Cross, Currie, Foxx	2:53
12.	"Quiet Men (Full Version)"	Cross, Currie, Foxx	3:55

== Personnel ==
Ultravox

- Warren Cann – drums, rhythm machine, vocals
- Chris Cross – bass, synthesizer, vocals
- Billy Currie – keyboards, violin
- John Foxx – vocals
- Robin Simon – guitar, vocals
