= Brilliant (album) =

2012 studio album by Ultravox

Studio album by Ultravox
- Released: May 25, 2012
- Recorded: September 2010 – December 2011
- Studios: The Lakehouse (Montreal); Environment (Bath); Sarm West (London); Battery (London); Studio City Sound (Studio City) (Note: Drums)
- Genres: Synth-pop; new wave
- Length: 52:48
- Label: Chrysalis
- Producers: Stephen Lipson; Ultravox

Ultravox chronology
The Best of Ultravox (2003)	Brilliant (2012)	The Albums 1980–2012 (2013)

Professional ratings
Review scores
Source	Rating
AllMusic	2.5/5 stars
The Bolton News	Favourable
Consequence of Sound	2/5 stars
Metro	Mixed
musicOMH	2.5/5 stars
Release Magazine	8/10
The Scotsman	2/5 stars
Spin	4/10
The West Australian	3/5 stars

Brilliant (stylised as Brill!ant) is the eleventh and final studio album by British synth-pop band Ultravox, released on May 25, 2012 by Chrysalis Records. It is the group's first studio album in 18 years, and the first in 28 years from the "classic" Ultravox line-up consisting of Midge Ure, Billy Currie, Warren Cann and Chris Cross (the last being 1984's Lament). The title track was released as its lead single, and premiered on April 17, 2012 on BBC Radio 2.

Brilliant debuted at number 21 on the UK Albums Chart, selling 6,100 copies in its first week. It received mixed reviews from critics.

== Background ==
Ure said in 2012: "We did get along on the reunion tour brilliantly and decided to make an album. It is such a weird thing to do what we did, to lock yourself away like we did in Canada, with no one else around. It was just Billy, Chris and I. Warren had commitments in Los Angeles and he didn't have to be part of it until later on. We were in the middle of the woods, in a cabin by the lake, it is freezing cold and there is no one there to talk to other than the band. But it worked out brilliantly mainly because we got along so well and the creativity was there. So the process of recording this was easy, it was great, it was very vibrant and exciting."

Currie said in 2012: "I discussed it with Midge and Chris as early as May 2009. They were not very interested then. We all got more serious about it while doing the 2010 'Return To Eden Part 2 tour' and in Sweden for the festivals, we spent the travelling time discussing how we would go about it. When we went over to Canada the first time in September 2010, we did not bring ideas with us to work on. I thought that was good. We all felt the same way. We had to start from scratch."

Cann's drums were recorded at Studio City Sound in Los Angeles.

== Track listing ==
All tracks are written by Midge Ure, Billy Currie and Chris Cross.

No.	Title	Length
1.	"Live"	4:11
2.	"Flow"	4:24
3.	"Brilliant"	4:22
4.	"Change"	4:30
5.	"Rise"	4:04
6.	"Remembering"	3:43
7.	"Hello"	5:40
8.	"One"	4:43
9.	"Fall"	4:07
10.	"Lie"	4:35
11.	"Satellite"	3:58
12.	"Contact"	4:31

== Personnel ==
Credits adapted from the liner notes of Brilliant.

=== Ultravox ===
- Warren Cann – drums
- Chris Cross – bass, synthesiser
- Billy Currie – piano, synthesiser, violin
- Midge Ure – vocals, guitar, synthesiser

=== Technical ===
- Stephen Lipson – production, mixing
- Ultravox – production, mixing
- Tom Weir – drum engineering
- Mazen Murad – mastering at Metropolis Mastering (London)
- Darren Evans – sleeve design

== Charts ==
Chart performance for Brilliant
Chart (2012)	Peak position
Austrian Albums (Ö3 Austria)	59
Belgian Albums (Ultratop Flanders)	182
Belgian Albums (Ultratop Wallonia)	185
Czech Albums (ČNS IFPI)	42
German Albums (Offizielle Top 100)	27
Italian Albums (FIMI)	84
Polish Albums (ZPAV)	28
Scottish Albums (Official Charts)	13
Swedish Albums (Sverigetopplistan)	36
Swiss Albums (Schweizer Hitparade)	67
UK Albums (Official Charts)	21

== Release history ==
Release history for Brilliant
Region	Date	Label	Ref.
Australia	25 May 2012	EMI	
Germany	25 May 2012	Eden	
United Kingdom	28 May 2012	Chrysalis	
Poland	28 May 2012	EMI	
France	29 May 2012	EMI	
Italy	29 May 2012	EMI	
Sweden	30 May 2012	EMI	
