= Robin Simon =

British guitarist (born 1956)

- Born: Robert Simon; 12 July 1956 (age 70); Halifax, West Yorkshire, England
- Genres: New wave; post-punk; synth-pop
- Occupation: Musician
- Instruments: Guitar; backing vocals; synths
- Years active: 1970s–present

Robert "Robin" Simon (born 12 July 1956) is a British guitarist who was a member of Ultravox, Magazine and Visage.

== Biography ==
=== Early career ===
Simon began playing guitar in a Halifax-based band, Kandahar, in the early to mid-1970s. He also met and played with future Ultravox member Billy Currie at that time. He moved to London in 1975 and later joined the punk pop band Ians Radio (later called Neo) in 1976. Neo were one of the bands on the early London punk live scene. They featured on the Live at the Vortex album and supported Ultravox several times at the Marquee club in London, before Simon was offered the guitarist position in Ultravox.

=== Ultravox ===
Adopting the stage name Robin Simon, he joined Ultravox as a replacement for Stevie Shears in 1977. Simon brought a more complex sound to the band with his use of guitar pedal effects.

Simon played all guitars on the Ultravox album Systems of Romance, produced by Conny Plank (of Kraftwerk fame) and Dave Hutchins. Simon pioneered the use of synthesizers that were put through guitar effects pedals, notably on the track "Quiet Men".

In early 1979, after the US tour with the band and no longer on Island Records, having been dropped by the label, John Foxx left Ultravox. Simon left some months later.

=== Magazine ===
After returning to the United Kingdom, Simon joined Magazine in 1980, replacing John McGeoch. He appears on Magazine's live album Play. After Magazine's tour of the United States and Australia/New Zealand plus a later live appearance with them in the movie Urgh! A Music War and on the German TV show Rockpalast, he left Magazine to record with John Foxx again, on the Garden album.

He played on the song "Saddest Quay", from Magazine keyboard player Dave Formula's solo album, Satellite Sweetheart, in 2009.

=== John Foxx ===
Simon contributed to Foxx's solo albums The Garden (1981), The Golden Section (1983), and In Mysterious Ways (1985). He also performed on stage during his 1983 world tour and at a special John Foxx & the Maths show at London's Roundhouse in 2010. He later became a member of John Foxx and the Maths with his contribution to the album Howl, released in 2020.

=== Humania ===
Ultravox had gone on to greater success with Midge Ure fronting the band, but when Ure left the band in 1988, Billy Currie began a short-lived project called Humania that included Simon on guitar. One song from this period was included on a compilation album, a live performance of "I Can’t Stay Long" from the Ultravox album Systems of Romance.

== Discography ==
Neo

- Live at the Vortex (1977) (compilation of various artists)

Ultravox

- Systems of Romance (1978)

Magazine

- Play (1980)

John Foxx

- The Garden (1981)
- The Golden Section (1983)
- In Mysterious Ways (1985)
- The Golden Section Tour + Omnidelic Exotour (2001) (only the first CD)

John Foxx and the Maths

- Howl (2020)

Humania

- Sinews of the Soul (2006)

Ajanta Music

- And Now We Dream (2006)

Visage

- Hearts and Knives (2013)
- Demons to Diamonds (2015)
