= Ha!-Ha!-Ha! =

Ha! Ha! Ha!

Studio album by Ultravox!
- Released: October 14, 1977
- Recorded: May–June 1977
- Studios: Phonogram (London, UK)
- Genres: Post-punk; new wave; art punk; punk rock
- Length: 34:40
- Label: Island
- Producers: Ultravox!; Steve Lillywhite

Ultravox! chronology
Ultravox! (1977)	Ha! Ha! Ha! (1977)	Retro (1978)

Singles from Ha! Ha! Ha!
- 1. "ROckWrok" Released: October 7, 1977; 2. "Quirks (only with the initial 10,000 copies of the album)" Released: October 14, 1977; 3. "Frozen Ones (Germany only)" Released: 1977

Professional ratings
Review scores
Source	Rating
AllMusic	3.5/5 stars
Record Mirror	4/5 stars
Sounds	3/5 stars

Ha! Ha! Ha! is the second album by British pop group Ultravox, at that time known as "Ultravox!", with an exclamation mark, as a nod to Neu!. Although the group would later achieve fame and commercial success with lead singer Midge Ure the band was, in 1977, led by singer/songwriter John Foxx who was accompanied by guitarist Stevie Shears, drummer Warren Cann, bassist Chris Cross and keyboard/violist Billy Currie.

== Release ==
Ha! Ha! Ha! was released on 14 October 1977, and was accompanied by lead single "ROckWrok" backed with "Hiroshima Mon Amour", which was released a week earlier. Neither reached the pop charts, although Island Records continued to have faith in the band. As a consequence of the album's confusing typography – it is variously known as Ha!-Ha!-Ha!, -ha!-ha!-ha! and Ha! Ha! Ha! (which is the actual title), the group decided to abandon their exclamation mark for subsequent releases.

== Description ==
Whilst the group's first album had been a product of the David Bowie/Roxy Music-esque side of glam rock, their second was considerably more informed by the burgeoning punk movement, although it also marked the group's first widespread adoption of synthesisers and electronic production techniques. Money from the first album was used to improve the band's equipment, and funded the purchase of an ARP Odyssey and, most notably, a Roland Rhythm 77 (TR-77) drum machine, which appeared on the album's final track, "Hiroshima Mon Amour". This song was the most indicative of the group's later synth-pop direction, and remains both a fan and critical favourite. It was performed on the group's 1978 Old Grey Whistle Test appearance and was covered by the Church on their 1999 covers album A Box of Birds and also by Jan Linton.

"ROckWrok" was the lead single. An unusually sensual paean to unrestrained sexuality, the song featured a chorus which began "come on, let's tangle in the dark/fuck like a dog, bite like a shark" and lyrics such as "the whole wide world fits hip to hip" – despite which, it apparently achieved airplay on BBC Radio 1 on account of Foxx's garbled vocal delivery and the song's punky guitars.

Other songs included "Fear in the Western World", which was also a punk number, with socially conscious references to contemporary global hot spots including Soweto and Ireland. "While I'm Still Alive", although subsequently regarded by the band as the album's weakest title, was particularly reminiscent of the Sex Pistols, and specifically the vocal phrasing of John Lydon. "Fear in the Western World" also ended with a short burst of feedback – edited from a much longer take, in the manner of the Beatles' "Helter Skelter" – which segued into the quiet piano opening of "Distant Smile", which eventually developed into a conventional rock number, albeit using a similar vocal-synth fade as Pink Floyd's contemporaneous "Sheep". "Artificial Life" was reminiscent of Roxy Music's "In Every Dream Home A Heartache", with lyrics that examined suburban teenage life and tribes. "Hiroshima Mon Amour", featured the saxophone playing of “c.c.” from the band Gloria Mundi, and includes the Roland Rhythm 77 (TR-77) drum machine working a modified bossa-nova preset by drummer Warren Cann, and foreshadowed the music both John Foxx and Ultravox were to make later, apart. In 2012, in an interview with peek-a-boo magazine, John Foxx agreed to say that it was the first synthpop/new-wave song in rock history: "I think no one else had done a song like that before", he said. This was the last album featuring original guitarist Stevie Shears, who left the band early 1978, after the forthcoming Ha! Ha! Ha! tour.

== Track listing ==
No.	Title	Writer(s)	Length
1.	"ROckWrok"	John Foxx	3:34
2.	"The Frozen Ones"	Foxx	4:07
3.	"Fear in the Western World"	Warren Cann, Chris Cross, Billy Currie, Foxx, Stevie Shears	4:00
4.	"Distant Smile"	Currie, Foxx	5:21
5.	"The Man Who Dies Every Day"	Cann, Cross, Currie, Foxx, Shears	4:10
6.	"Artificial Life"	Currie, Foxx	4:59
7.	"While I'm Still Alive"	Foxx	3:16
8.	"Hiroshima Mon Amour"	Cann, Currie, Foxx	5:13

2006 reissue bonus tracks
No.	Title	Writer(s)	Length
9.	"Young Savage"	Cann, Cross, Currie, Foxx, Shears	2:56
10.	"The Man Who Dies Every Day (Remix)"	Cann, Cross, Currie, Foxx, Shears	4:15
11.	"Hiroshima Mon Amour (Alternate Version)"	Cann, Currie, Foxx	4:54
12.	"Quirks"	Cann, Cross, Currie, Foxx, Shears	1:40
13.	"The Man Who Dies Every Day (Live)"	Cann, Cross, Currie, Foxx, Shears	4:15
14.	"Young Savage (Live)"	Cann, Cross, Currie, Foxx, Shears	3:25

Give-away single with first 10000 LPs
No.	Title	Writer(s)	Length
15.	"Quirks"	Cann, Cross, Currie, Foxx, Shears	1:40
16.	"Modern Love"	Cann, Cross, Currie, Foxx, Shears	2.31

== Personnel ==
Ultravox!

- Warren Cann – drums, vocals, rhythm machine on "Hiroshima Mon Amour"
- Chris Cross – bass, vocals
- Billy Currie – violas, keyboards, synthesiser
- John Foxx – vocals, guitar on "Hiroshima Mon Amour"
- Stevie Shears – guitar

Additional personnel

- c.c. (from Gloria Mundi) – saxophone on "Hiroshima Mon Amour"
