= Ultravox! (album) =

Studio album by Ultravox!
- Released: February 25, 1977
- Recorded: 1976
- Studios: Island, London
- Genres: New wave; glam rock; art rock; punk rock
- Length: 38:04
- Label: Island
- Producers: Brian Eno; Ultravox!; Steve Lillywhite

Ultravox! chronology
Ultravox! (1977)	Ha! Ha! Ha! (1977)

Singles from Ultravox!
- 1. "Dangerous Rhythm" Released: February 4, 1977

Ultravox! is the debut studio album by the British new wave band Ultravox. It was recorded at Island Studios in Hammersmith, London in the autumn of 1976 and produced by Ultravox and Steve Lillywhite with studio assistance from Brian Eno. It was released by Island Records on February 25, 1977.

== Writing ==
The songs "Satday Night in the City of the Dead" and "Dangerous Rhythm", alongside other songs from the album, were written while the band were named Tiger Lily. The former song predated punk music, written over a year before the emergence of punk. The latter, a reggae influenced song, was released as the first Ultravox single in February 1977 to positive reviews. The band's early ambition to combine 1950s and 1960s pop music with the intensity of raw rock music and glam rock developed into writing longer and more intricate songs like "I Want to Be a Machine". The song "My Sex" includes an early use of a synthesizer. Lyrically the album is mainly about the band's environment, living in London in the mid-1970s, with lyricist John Foxx being heavily influenced by the writings of J. G. Ballard. "Life At Rainbow's End (For All The Tax Exiles On Main Street)" pointedly criticizes the hugely popular 'dinosaur' bands of the past, namely The Rolling Stones, who released an album called Exile On Main Street in 1972.

== Reception ==
Professional ratings
Review scores
Source	Rating
AllMusic	4/5 stars
Christgau's Record Guide	B
Record Mirror	4/5 stars

Ada Wilson in The Rough Guide to Rock wrote that the album "failed to recapture [Ultravox!'s] on-stage energy". In his retrospective review, Dave Thompson, writing for AllMusic, opined "it was Ultravox! who first showed the kind of dangerous rhythms that keyboards could create. The quintet certainly had their antecedents – Hawkwind, Roxy Music and Kraftwerk to name but a few – but still it was the group's 1977 eponymous debut's grandeur (courtesy of producer Brian Eno), wrapped in the ravaged moods and lyrical themes of collapse and decay that transported '70s rock from the bloated pastures of the past to the futuristic dystopias predicted by punk."

== Track listing ==
No.	Title	Writer(s)	Length
1.	"Satday Night in the City of the Dead"	John Foxx	2:35
2.	"Life at Rainbow's End (For All the Tax Exiles on Main Street)"	Foxx	3:44
3.	"Slip Away"	Billy Currie, Foxx	4:19
4.	"I Want to Be a Machine"	Currie, Foxx	7:21
5.	"Wide Boys"	Foxx	3:16
6.	"Dangerous Rhythm"	Warren Cann, Chris Cross, Currie, Foxx, Stevie Shears	4:16
7.	"The Lonely Hunter"	Foxx	3:42
8.	"The Wild, the Beautiful and the Damned"	Cross, Currie, Foxx	5:50
9.	"My Sex"	Cross, Currie, Foxx	3:01

2006 reissue bonus tracks
No.	Title	Writer(s)	Length
10.	"Slip Away (Live)"	Currie, Foxx	4:12
11.	"Modern Love (Live)"	Cann, Cross, Currie, Foxx, Shears	2:31
12.	"The Wild, The Beautiful and the Damned (Live)"	Cross, Currie, Foxx	5:18
13.	"My Sex (Live)"	Cross, Currie, Foxx	3:05

== Personnel ==
Ultravox!

- Warren Cann – drums, backing vocals
- Chris Cross – bass, backing vocals
- Billy Currie – keyboards, violin
- John Foxx – lead vocals, acoustic guitar on "I Want to Be a Machine", harmonica on "Satday Night in the City of the Dead"
- Stevie Shears – guitars

Technical personnel

- Terry Barham – assistant engineer
