= Stevie Shears =

English musician

- Also known as: Steve Shears, Steven Shears
- Born: 1954 or 1955 (sources vary)
- Origin: Dagenham, Essex, England
- Genres: New wave, synthpop, glam rock
- Occupation: Musician
- Instruments: Guitar, bass, keyboards, drums
- Years active: 1973–present

Stevie Shears (born 1954/1955) is an English musician known for playing in the rock bands Tiger Lily and Ultravox! (later Ultravox), as well as being part of the bands Faith Global and Cowboys International.

== Biography ==
=== Tiger Lily and Ultravox! ===
Working in a paint factory and playing in different bands in Dagenham, Essex, he made contact with John Foxx and formed Tiger Lily in April 1974 (together with bassist Chris Cross). Later, Tiger Lily changed its name to Ultravox! (later known simply as Ultravox). Between February and March 1978, after releasing with this band the Ultravox! (early 1977) and Ha! Ha! Ha! (1977) albums Shears was replaced by Robin Simon.

=== Post-Ultravox! bands ===
After Ultravox!, Shears formed a band with his friend Ice, real name Roland Oxland, bassist of Gloria Mundi. Gloria Mundi and Ultravox! were friends from the UK live music scene. Gloria Mundi featured Eddie Maelov and Sunshine Patterson who, as Eddie & Sunshine, would support Ultravox on their 1981 Rage in Eden tour. Gloria Mundi's saxophonist CC also played on 'Hiroshima Mon Amour' from Ultravox's second album Ha! Ha! Ha! (1977). Later Shears and Jason Guy formed a duo called New Men. This was short-lived, as Shears left to join Cowboys International, in early 1980, replacing Adam Ant's guitarist Marco Pirroni. In 1981 and with Cowboys International dissolved, he collaborated with the band's singer, Ken Lockie, on his solo album, The Impossible.

Shears, never having lost contact with Guy, collaborated under the name of Faith Global, and released an EP called Earth Report (1982) and an album called The Same Mistakes (1983) both on Survival Records. Faith Global was short-lived, and these two records remain their only recordings.

As of 2000, he was still playing guitar.

== Equipment ==
When Ultravox! was Tiger Lily, he used a Gibson SG guitar.

Also while with Ultravox, he played a white Fender Telecaster and a Fender Stratocaster.

== Discography ==
With Tiger Lily:

- "Ain't Misbehavin'" single (Gull, 1975)

With Ultravox!:

- Ultravox! album (Island, 1977)
- Ha!-Ha-!Ha! album (Island, 1977)
- Retro EP (Island, 1978)

With Cowboys International:

- Revisited compilation (Pnuma, 2003)

With Ken Lockie:

- The Impossible album (Virgin, 1981)
- Dance House single

With Faith Global:

- Earth Report EP (Survival, 1982)
- The Same Mistakes album (Survival, 1983)
