= Chris Cross =

English bass guitarist (1952–2024)

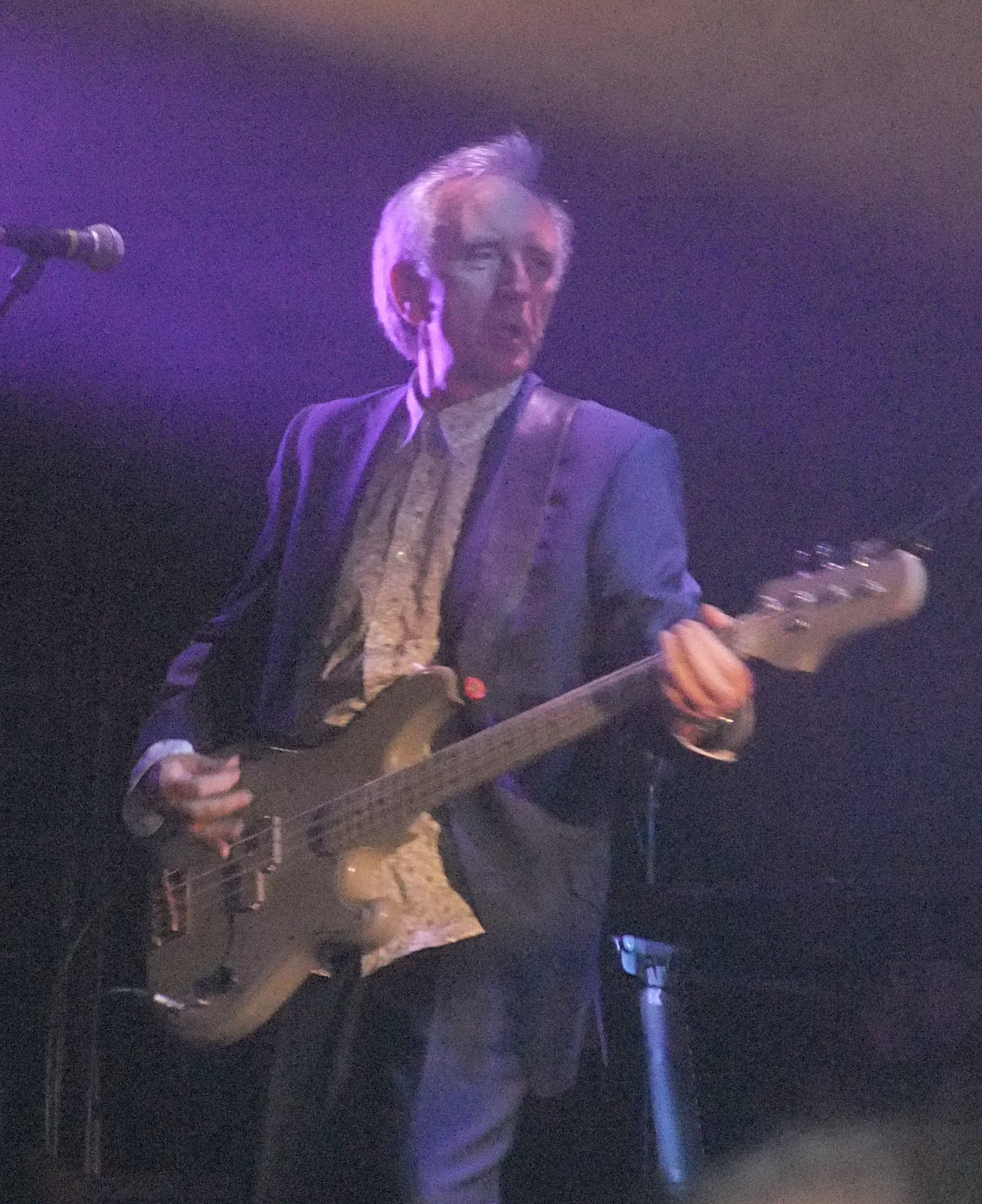
- Cross in 2009

Background information
- Also known as: Chris St. John
- Born: Christopher Thomas Allen; 14 July 1952; Tottenham, London, England
- Died: 25 March 2024 (aged 71)
- Genres: New wave; art rock; post-punk; synth-pop; glam rock
- Occupation: Musician
- Instruments: Bass; keyboards
- Years active: 1973–1989; 2009–2013
- Formerly of: Stoned Rose; Tiger Lily; Ultravox

Christopher Thomas Allen (14 July 1952 – 25 March 2024), known professionally as Chris Cross, was an English musician, best known as the bass guitarist in the new wave band Ultravox. After starting his music career with Stoned Rose, a band in Preston, Lancashire, he was one of the founding members of the band Tiger Lily in April 1974, before the band was renamed Ultravox! over two years later. The band's most successful single, "Vienna", was released in 1981.

Cross left Ultravox in 1989, several years after the band's studio album U-Vox was released in 1986. He rejoined the band after their revival in 2009 with a tour, and Ultravox released Brilliant, another studio album, three years later. Cross died in 2024 at the age of 71.

== Biography ==
=== Early years ===
Christopher Thomas Allen was born in Tottenham, London, England, on 14 July 1952. He went to Belmont Secondary Modern School and William Forster Comprehensive. He began his music career playing in different bands, with his major early influences being Small Faces, Desmond Dekker and The Crazy World of Arthur Brown.

Later he joined Stoned Rose, in Preston, Lancashire, but also decided to go to college to study psychology, a longstanding interest.

=== Tiger Lily and Ultravox ===
After his time at college he returned to London to apply at the Royal College of Art. Meanwhile, after answering an advertisement, the band Tiger Lily was created in 1974, with the founding members consisting of Cross (then identified as Chris St. John), singer Dennis Leigh, guitarist Stevie Shears, drummer Warren Cann, and violinist/keyboardist Billy Currie. After playing gigs from 1974 to 1976, in the latter year the band renamed themselves Ultravox! and signed to Island Records.

In 1979, after three commercially unsuccessful but influential albums – Ultravox! (1977), Ha!-Ha!-Ha! (1977) and Systems of Romance (1978) – original vocalist John Foxx and guitarist Robin Simon, who had replaced Stevie Shears a year before, left Ultravox.

Midge Ure joined Ultravox in 1979, and the band released their commercially successful Vienna album a year later. By that time Cross and Ure were close friends; they together directed music videos such as Bananarama's "Shy Boy" and "The Telephone Always Rings" by Fun Boy Three. The band then produced another few successful albums: Rage in Eden (1981), Quartet (1982), Monument (1983) and Lament (1984). After U-Vox, a studio album released in 1986, Cross left Ultravox in 1989 and pursued a career as a psychotherapist. Before Cross's departure, Ure had also left the band to perform as a solo artist before rejoining, but Cross noted the band "fell apart" after Ure rejoined, also stating "it was like everyone lost interest".

=== Ultravox revival ===
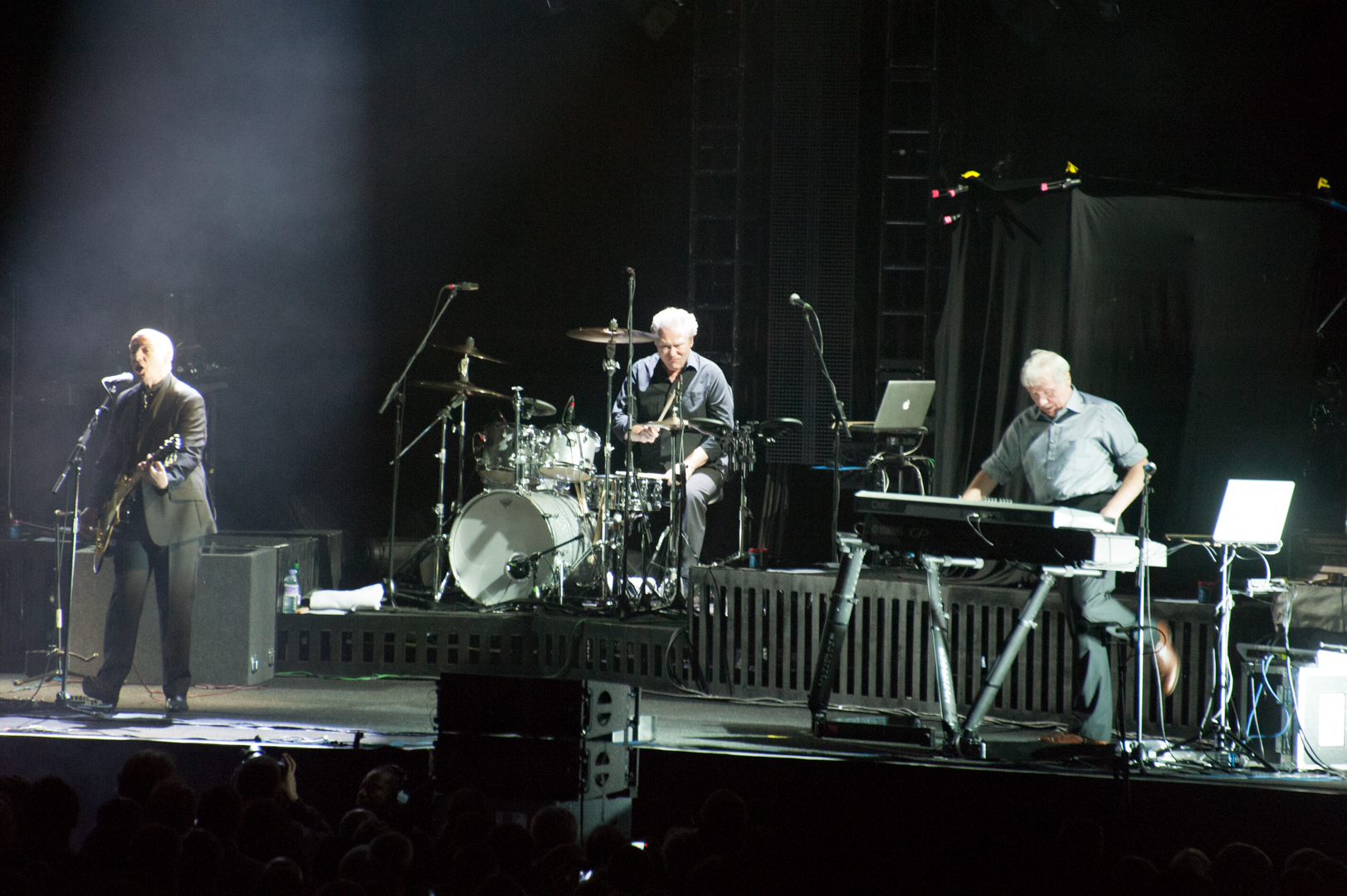
Ultravox performing at The O2 in London in 2013

In April 2009, Ultravox embarked on the "Return to Eden" tour, which included two festivals and a Best of Ultravox CD/DVD being released by EMI.

The 2012 album release, Brilliant, included Cross as co-writer with Billy Currie and Midge Ure on all tracks. The album was promoted with a UK theatre tour and a series of European dates. Ultravox made their final performance in 2013, at The O2 in London.

== Death ==
Cross died on 25 March 2024, aged 71. His death was announced by Midge Ure.
