= Warren Cann =

Canadian drummer, drum machine programmer and songwriter

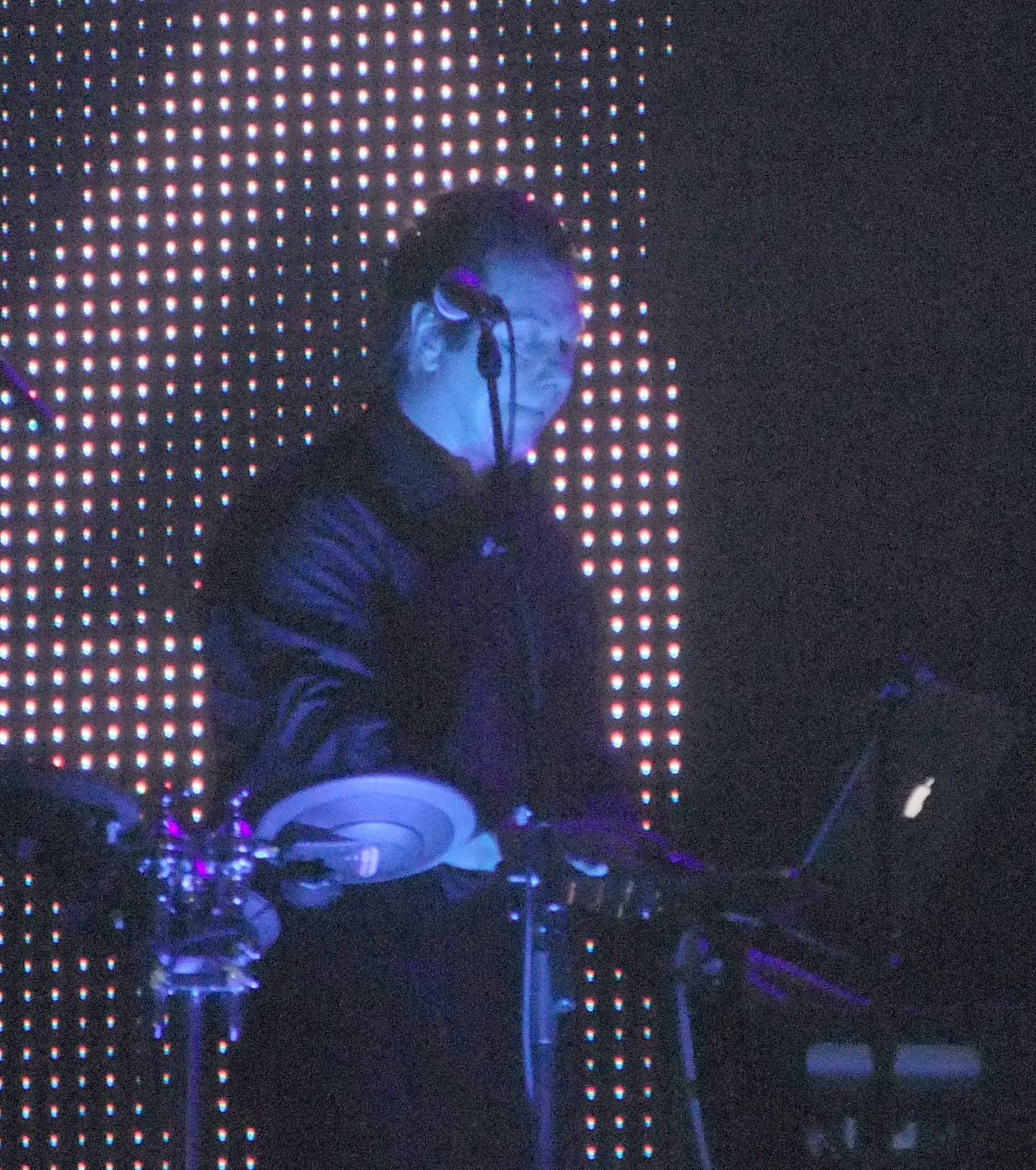

Background information
- Born: Warren Reginald Cann; 20 May 1950 (age 75); Victoria, British Columbia
- Genres: New wave
- Instrument: Drums
- Formerly of: Ultravox

Warren Reginald Cann (born 20 May 1950) is a Canadian drummer and songwriter. He was a founding member of the British new wave band Ultravox.

== Early life ==
Born in Victoria, British Columbia, Canada as the son of two British immigrants, he became interested in electronics while he was at school. After playing in bands in Vancouver, including Python, he and a Python bandmate moved to Britain in 1972, where they found a more creative environment. Cann established himself in London, where he formed his first band, along with Huw Lloyd-Langton, future Hawkwind member, on guitar and Rob Rawlinson, later in Overnight Angels, on bass.

== Ultravox and other contemporary works ==
Shortly thereafter, Cann contacted John Foxx, who invited Cann to join his fledgling band Tiger Lily with bassist Chris Cross and guitarist Stevie Shears. The band recorded the sole single "Ain't Misbehavin'", which was released in 1975 and used as a main theme to the namesake softcore porno film. In 1976, Tiger Lily changed its name to Ultravox!, and later in 1978 to Ultravox.

Cann played on the first albums released by Island Records, Ultravox! (1977), Ha! Ha! Ha! (both 1977) and Systems of Romance (1978). After a tour of the United States and Canada, the band fragmented because of the departure of vocalist John Foxx and guitarist Robin Simon. Ultravox replaced them with singer/guitarist Midge Ure in the summer of 1979.

The Ure-led Ultravox signed to Chrysalis in 1980 and went on to have commercial success worldwide. Cann, having a role as a songwriter along with Currie, contributed lyrics to two thirds of the first Ure-led album Vienna, sang backing vocals, and co-lead and lead on some Ultravox songs: "Mr. X" (1980), "Paths and Angles" (1981), "We Came to Dance" (1982) and "Break Your Back" (1983).

He remained active outside the band during Ultravox's success. In 1982, he played acoustic and electronic percussion for Zaine Griff (on the album Figvres) and Peter Godwin (on the single "Images of Heaven"). He and Hans Zimmer were a part of the backing band for a New Romantic singer named Ronny on her London show at The Dominion. Ronny also participated in the Helden project, formed by Cann and Zimmer that year, which merged electronic, orchestral and classical influences. Helden were the first music project to play The London Planetarium in March 1983. They released a single, "Holding On" in 1983 and recorded an album called Spies which featured many guests (Zaine Griff, Eddie Maelov from Eddie & Sunshine, Brian Robertson from Thin Lizzy and more). It remains unreleased.

In September 1984, Cann and Zimmer performed as guests (on drums and keyboards, respectively) at a concert by the Spanish band Mecano. Two songs from that show were released in 1985 on the LP En Concierto. Also in 1985, Cann produced a single for the eccentric singer Duffo, "Gonna Send the Boys Around", and took part in the Doctor Who charity single "Doctor in Distress".

Cann was ousted from the band in 1986, after disagreements arose with other band members who started to consider him a problem for the progress of the band. Cann wanted a fully programmed percussion sound while the others preferred a "back-to-basics" approach. In his autobiography, Midge Ure later commented that in retrospect he considered the firing unjust, unwarranted, and a result of misplaced tensions, describing Cann's dismissal as "cutting the band's jugular vein".

Following his departure from Ultravox, Cann recorded a solo demo which was turned down by Chrysalis Records. He did session work for other artists, including 7000 Danses by Indochine, appeared on several television shows with Kim Wilde and produced demos for aspiring bands. He joined a band called the Sons of Valentino, and then played guitar and keyboards with the Huw Lloyd-Langton Group. He later moved to Los Angeles to pursue a future in film scoring. Cann made the music to Deadly Currency (1998), as well as writing for music technology magazines such as Sound on Sound.

Cann rejoined Ultravox over two decades later in 2008, which reunited the classic lineup last seen at Live Aid in 1985. In April 2009, the band toured on the Return to Eden tour. In May 2012, the first studio album in 28 years by this lineup was released, titled Brilliant.

After the Brilliant Tour, Cann retired to stay with his family.

== Technical innovations ==
Cann and his technicians were among the first to modify commercially available rhythm units or drum machines, so they could alter and override the preset manufacturer programs. This is notable on "Hiroshima Mon Amour", from the album Ha!-Ha!-Ha!. When Ultravox were recording Vienna, Cann's electronic ventures would become part of the Ultravox sound. The acquisition of a Roland CR-78 proved something of a headache for Cann, as he saw great sonic potential in it, but it had limited pattern programmability. In the process of adding some practical customisations to the CR-78, Cann became somewhat persona non grata at the Roland headquarters in the UK.

The initial reaction to the usage of drum machines led to bewilderment among the audience, who wondered what Cann was doing during some songs. Among claims that he was doing nothing, he decided to equip his drum machines with clear perspex cases instead of wood panels, and mount a variety of LEDs inside them as a feature Cann himself described as "absolutely useless, but very impressive looking on a darkened stage; now it would be obvious I was actually doing something."

In addition to his drum machine work, Cann designed several modifications for bass player Chris Cross' Minimoog, among them a primitive sequencer (built by Roy Gwinn) made from a series of toggle switches to add syncopation to the synthesiser's ability to create a stream of eighth notes, and a proprietary triggering system that allowed Cann and Cross to synchronise the Minimoog with Cann's drum machines, a feat performed almost three years before MIDI was officially introduced in 1983. According to Midge Ure's autobiography, when the Minimoog broke down on tour, Ultravox borrowed one from the Cars, but it did not help as it lacked the proprietary modifications.

== Legacy ==
Speaking in 1986, Rush drummer Neil Peart named Cann as one of the drummers who had influenced and inspired him.
