= Billy Currie =

British multi-instrumentalist

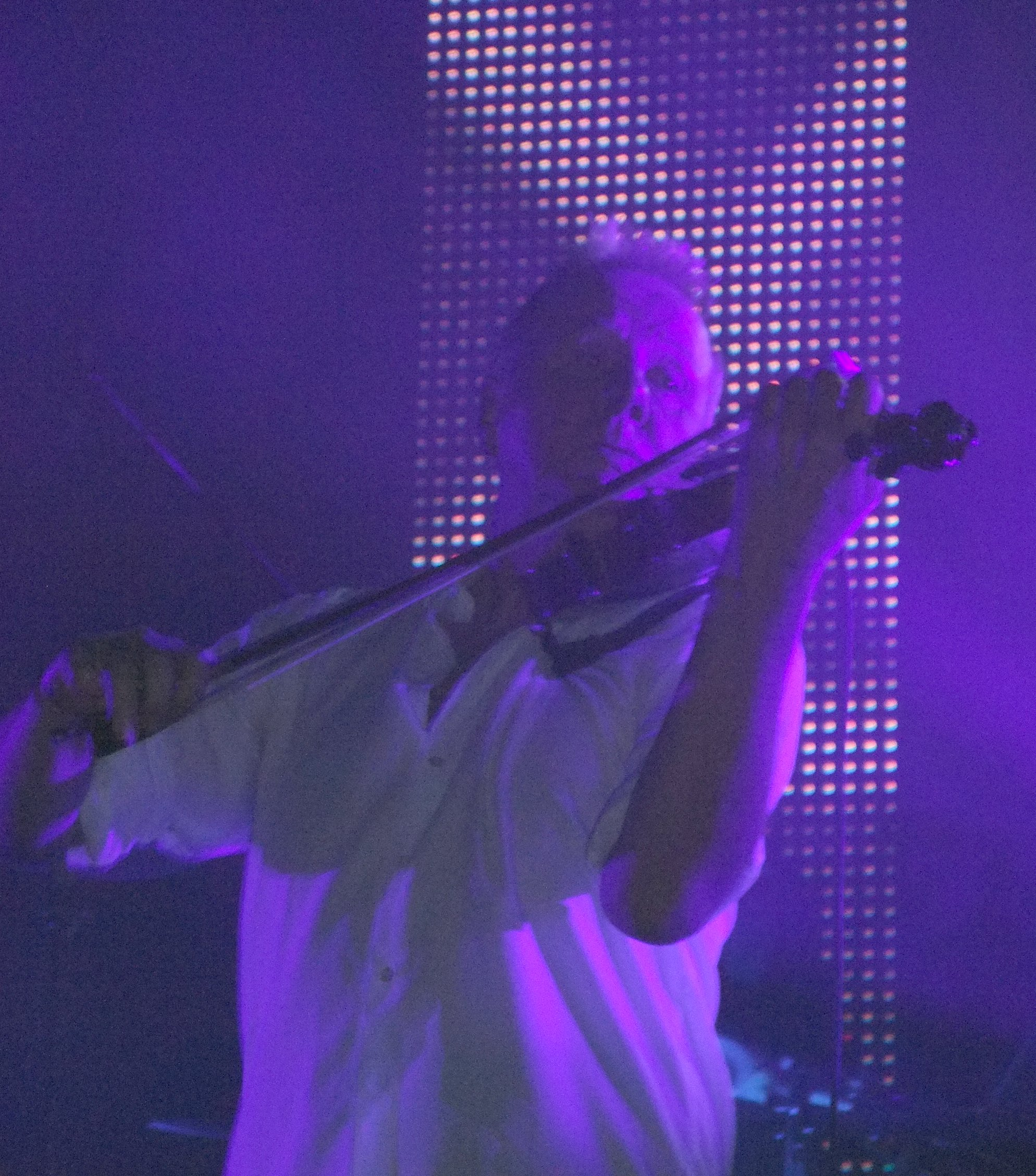
- Currie performing in 2009

Background information
- Also known as: Billy Curry
- Born: William Lee Currie; 1 April 1950 (age 76)
- Origin: Huddersfield, England
- Genres: New wave; art rock; post-punk; synthpop; glam rock; cosmic music; new-age
- Occupation: Musician
- Instruments: Viola; violin; piano; keyboards
- Years active: 1974–present
- Formerly of: Tiger Lily; Ultravox; Visage; Tubeway Army

William Lee Currie (born 1 April 1950) is a British multi-instrumentalist and songwriter from Huddersfield, England. He is best known as the keyboard and strings player with new wave band Ultravox, who achieved their greatest commercial success in the 1980s.

== Biography ==
Currie was born in Huddersfield, West Yorkshire and had an interest in music from an early age. As a child he sang a lot and at the age of ten he got a guitar. In 1961 he picked up the violin at school and also sang in a choir. A year later he was in the school orchestra, but had to change instrument to viola to get a place at the Huddersfield School of Music, which he joined in 1965. The education was a preparation to become an orchestral player, learning viola with piano as his second instrument and also studying composition and harmony. During this time he joined a string quartet, played viola in an orchestra and performed with a viola, clarinet and piano trio. At this time Currie was excited to discover composers like Béla Bartók, Arnold Schoenberg, Arthur Honegger and Edgar Varese. By 1967 he became increasingly interested in rock music, excited by the fact that bands created something unique and original together. In 1969 he had qualified for a place at the Royal Academy of Music in London for further education, but decided not to go. Currie was interested in breaking into other areas of music and joined a rock band instead, playing viola. In the early 1970s he was a member of the experimental art group The Ritual Theatre, which included four classically trained musicians and four dancers. With this group Currie performed in Holland, Edinburgh Festival and various other places.

In 1974, Currie left Ritual Theatre to join the glam rock band Tiger Lily on viola and keyboard. In 1976, after several name changes, the band ultimately became Ultravox and recorded three albums, Ultravox!, Ha! Ha! Ha! and Systems of Romance, before singer John Foxx left to pursue a solo career in March 1979.

During Ultravox's subsequent hiatus, Currie dedicated himself to different projects. He collaborated with Gary Numan who had admired the Systems of Romance album and asked Currie to record some songs that were included on his first solo album, The Pleasure Principle. Currie toured with Numan's band during 1979. During soundchecks for the tour Currie, with Gary Numan band musicians Chris Payne and Cedric Sharpley began to develop a song of their own called "Toot City". Currie had also joined the studio-based band Visage, fronted by Steve Strange, that also included Midge Ure. Currie and Ure developed a solid working relationship. Visage drummer Rusty Egan encouraged Currie to ask Ure to join the defunct Ultravox as lead singer/guitarist. Whilst composing material for a new Ultravox album and for the debut Visage album, Ure collaborated with Currie on the "Toot City" track which eventually became "Fade to Grey". The single became a huge hit for Visage in early 1981. However, this was surpassed by Ultravox's hit "Vienna", released around the same time. Both Ultravox and Visage became highly successful recording acts in the early 1980s. Ure decided to leave Visage to focus on Ultravox full-time in 1982. Currie remained with Visage for a while longer, but he too had left by 1984.

From 1980 to 1986, Ultravox released seven top 10 albums, including a live album and a "greatest hits" compilation and featured in Live Aid in Wembley Stadium on 13 July 1985. During the last days of the band, there were tensions between Currie and Ure. With an underwhelming response to their 1986 album U-Vox, the band effectively disintegrated.

In 1988, Currie put out an instrumental solo album Transportation, released on the IRS NoSpeak record label. Steve Howe played guitar on six tracks, with Currie later playing keyboards on Howe's 1991 album Turbulence. In 1989 Currie formed the band Humania. An album by them called Sinews of Soul was released in 2005.

In 1992, Currie reformed Ultravox with a new line-up (himself being the only original member involved). With Tony Fennell on vocals, they recorded the album "Revelation". At the outset of the subsequent tour, Fennell left to be replaced by Sam Blue. The tour took in the former USSR and Malta amongst other locations. Many of the synthesisers for which Currie was famous, apart from the often-volatile OSCar and Minimoog, were abandoned for this tour, replaced with Korg Wavestations and T-series keyboards. A further Ultravox album featuring this line-up, "Ingenuity", was released in 1994. Both albums were commercially unsuccessful.

Since 2001 Billy Currie has released several solo albums on his own label. These include Unearthed, completed in 1998, and Keys and the Fiddle, which includes Curries soundtrack to the short film The Fragile Skin (1999), new material and a previously unreleased 1983 collaboration with Steve Howe and Hazel O'Connor.

In 2009 and 2010, the "classic" Ultravox line-up from the 1980s (Currie, Ure, Chris Cross, and Warren Cann) reformed for two successful tours – their first together in over twenty years. In 2016 Currie announced his retirement from Ultravox. In May 2016 he released his 10th solo album Doppel.

== Instruments ==
Currie is noted for his use of analogue synthesisers, such as the Elka Rhapsody, and in particular his trademark soloing sound, which typically consisted of soaring fluid lines on an ARP Odyssey, making use of oscillator sync, later re-created with the Oxford Synthesiser Company OSCar synth. Currie's original instrument whilst at music college was the viola, and he frequently added solo violin or viola to the arrangements of songs he played on, a relatively unusual choice in pop music. At the height of Ultravox's career, Billy Currie's keyboard rig included a Yamaha CP70 electric piano and SS30 string machine, CS80 synthesiser, Oberheim OBX, RMI Electra-Piano 368, a PPG Wave 2.2 digital synth, a Sequential Circuits Prophet T8 synth as well as his trademark ARP Odyssey. Other synths used by Ultravox included the Moog MiniMoog, Yamaha GS1 (the pad sound on "Lament") and Emulator II sampler.

== Personal life ==
Currie is married to Heidi (his 2nd wife) and has a son named Tom and a daughter named Lucy. He lives in North London.

== Associated bands ==
- Barry Edwards' "The Ritual Theatre"
- Ultravox (1974–1988, 1991–1996, 2009–2017)
- Visage (1979–1984)
- Gary Numan (1979–80)
- The Armoury Show (1985)
- Humania (1988–89)
- Phil Lynott
- Steve Howe

== Discography ==
=== With Ultravox ===
- Ultravox! (1977)
- Ha! Ha! Ha! (1977)
- Systems of Romance (1978)
- Vienna (1980)
- Rage in Eden (1981)
- Quartet (1982)
- Monument (1983)
- Lament (1984)
- U-Vox (1986)
- Revelation (1993)
- Ingenuity (1994)
- Brilliant (2012)

=== With Gary Numan ===
- The Pleasure Principle (1979) (guest)
- Living Ornaments '79 (1981)

=== With Visage ===
- Visage (1980)
- The Anvil (1982)
- Beat Boy (1984) (guest)

=== With Dead or Alive ===
- Unhappy Birthday (1990)

=== With Humania ===
- Sinews of the Soul (2005, recorded 1989)

=== Solo ===
- Transportation (1988) – with guest Steve Howe
- Stand Up and Walk (1991)
- Unearthed (2001)
- Keys and the Fiddle (2001)
- Push (2002)
- Pieces of the Puzzle (2003) – Compilation
- Still Movement (2004)
- Accidental Poetry of the Structure (2006)
- Sixty Minutes With (2007) – Compilation
- Refine (2009)
- Balletic Transcend (2013)
- Doppel (2016)
- The Brushwork Oblast (2020)
- Augmented (2026)
