= Dancing with Tears in My Eyes (album) =

Dancing With Tears In My Eyes

Compilation album by Ultravox
- Released: October 16, 1995
- Genre: Synth-pop
- Length: 60:21
- Label: EMI
- Producer: Ultravox

Ultravox chronology
Ingenuity (1994)	Dancing With Tears In My Eyes (1995)	Extended Ultravox (1998)

Professional ratings
Review scores
Source	Rating
AllMusic	2.5/5 stars

Dancing with Tears in My Eyes is a 1995 compilation from British band Ultravox and includes a selection of singles and their associated B-side tracks from the band's output with Midge Ure as frontman, recorded from 1980 to 1986. The album was released by EMI on CD and cassette as part of the label's "Music For Pleasure" series. It was repackaged and re-released in 1996 by the Disky label with the same title, then again on February 17, 1997 by EMI Gold, strikingly repackaged by Extreme Voice, the Ultravox fanzine and name of the official Ultravox website at the time.

EMI had also repackaged the CD and cassette as 19 Classic Tracks, exclusively produced for Boots and released in 1996 with three additional tracks: One Small Day, When the Time Comes and The Thin Wall, and again in 1997 as The Voice - The Best of Ultravox, this time with the inclusion of two additional tracks, The Thin Wall and Lament, within a resequenced tracklisting.

Finally, the compilation was repackaged and reissued yet again on CD by EMI Gold as The Best of Ultravox, released on December 1, 2003 with the same tracklisting as the original release from 1995.

== Track listing ==
1. "Sleepwalk" – 3:14 from Vienna
2. "Waiting" – 3:52 B-Side to "Sleepwalk" single
3. "Passing Strangers" – 3:51 from Vienna
4. "Vienna" – 4:39 (single edit) from Vienna
5. "Passionate Reply" – 4:18 B-Side to "Vienna" single
6. "The Voice" – 4:25 (single edit) from Rage in Eden
7. "Hymn" – 4:26 (single edit) from Quartet
8. "Monument" – 3:17 B-Side to "Hymn" single
9. "We Came to Dance" – 4:10 (single edit) from Quartet
10. "Dancing with Tears in My Eyes" – 4:06 (single edit) from Lament
11. "Reap the Wild Wind" – 3:46 (single edit) from Quartet
12. "Love's Great Adventure" – 3:08 from The Collection
13. "White China (Live)" – 3:47 B-Side to "Love's Great Adventure" single
14. "All Fall Down" – 5:09 from U-Vox
15. "Dreams?" – 2:33 B-Side to "All Fall Down" single
16. "All in One Day" – 4:20 (single edit) from U-Vox
