= List of electronic drum performers =

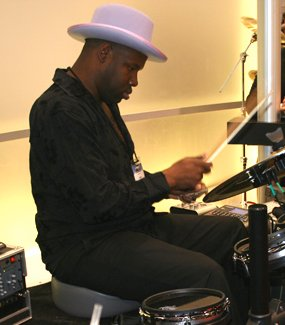
John Blackwell Jr. used electronic drums when he played with Prince.

This is a partial list of notable users of electronic drums. Electronic drums have sensors or sensor-equipped pads, which the drummer strikes with a stick (or with their hand) to trigger synthesized or sampled drum or percussion sounds that are stored in a memory in an electronic drum module or synthesizer. For many of the entries, the brand or type of electronic drum that they use is given, or one or more examples of songs that use electronic drums are provided.

"Users" includes individual musicians, DJs, music producers, and bands. People and groups are included whether they exclusively use electronic drums or if they use a mix of acoustic and electronic drums, or if they only use electronic drums on some songs.

Electronic drums should not be confused with drum machines, which use a computer program, rather than a human drummer, to play the beats and patterns.

== A–G ==
- Tim Alexander (Primus)
- Rick Allen of Def Leppard 1983–present. After losing his left arm, Allen used a customized kit built by Simmons, but has since modified his drums.
- Donny Baldwin (Starship)
- Nick Barker (Dimmu Borgir)
- Travis Barker on +44's When Your Heart Stops Beating
- Sebastian b.i.d Beresford (Arkarna, Leftfield, DJ Hyper, Above & Beyond)
- Larry Blackmon of Cameo
- Hal Blaine – Pollard Syndrum
- Craig Blundell – (Frost, Pendragon, Ghosts of Fortune, Inglorious, and numerous top artists).
- Tim Booth of James – plays an electronic drum during live concerts, notably on Hey Ma track Bubbles, although he does not do so in the studio.
- Rob Bourdon of Linkin Park uses six Pintech pads on the left of his kit, with different snare sounds triggered.
- Bill Bruford in (King Crimson), (ABWH), (Yes) and (Earthworks)
- Producer Gus Dudgeon played the Simmons SDSV on two of Elton John's albums: 1985's Ice on Fire and 1986's Leather Jackets.
- Dennis Candella of Guttural uses a Roland TD-9KX when playing Guitar Hero and Rock Band with Team Zephyr
- Warren Cann (Ultravox) An electronic percussion pioneer who made extensive use of the instruments on the albums Vienna, Rage in Eden, Quartet, and Lament.
- Danny Carey of Tool (band) – uses 7 Synesthesia Mandala Drums, which sense strike position and velocity.
- Igor Cavalera (Sepultura)
- Colm Ó Cíosóig (My Bloody Valentine) on the Loveless album.
- Rick Colaluca (Watchtower) (Only toms)
- Coldplay
- Steve Coy of Dead or Alive (band) (used Simmons drums combined with real cymbals during concerts)
- Chip Davis (of Mannheim Steamroller)
- Phil Collins (Genesis) – Simmons kits (SDSV, SDS7) on Genesis and Invisible Touch albums as well as his solo album No Jacket Required, Synare drums (various including the tympani) on Abacab and Genesis as well as the And Then There Were Three and Duke tours, Simmons SDX on We Can't Dance.
- Micky Dolenz: During the Monkees' mid 1990s reunion tour
- Doll Factory
- Sly Dunbar He frequently used an electric drum set while playing with the band Black Uhuru.
- Stuart Elliott (The Alan Parsons Project) – Simmons kit
- Tats Faustino
- Wolfgang Flür, Karl Bartos (Kraftwerk), built their own manual electronic drum kit.
- Josh Freese (Devo) – Roland V-Drums
- Yasuchika Fujii (P-MODEL) – Bass drum was used to activate sequencer
- Jack Garratt – Used in all his live performances.
- Bud Gaugh – sublime- dub effects
- Rocky Gray (Evanescence) – Wirges kit

== H–N ==
- Alex Van Halen
- Ernst Hefter (Ganymed)
- Zach Hill of Death Grips
- Malcolm Holmes (Orchestral Manoeuvres in the Dark) On his first Top of the Pops TV performance in 1980 he performed 'standing up' playing an electronic drum kit.
- Peter Hook, New Order's former bass guitarist
- Mark Jackson – ex-VNV Nation
- Rogerio Jardim – Infected Mushroom
- Akira Jimbo
- Jean-Michel Jarre
- Osamu Kitajima
- Da Kurlzz (Hollywood Undead) He uses electronic drums in every live show and on the album Swan Songs
- Marina (of the Fresh Beat Band)
- Nick Mason (Pink Floyd)
- Pat Mastelotto
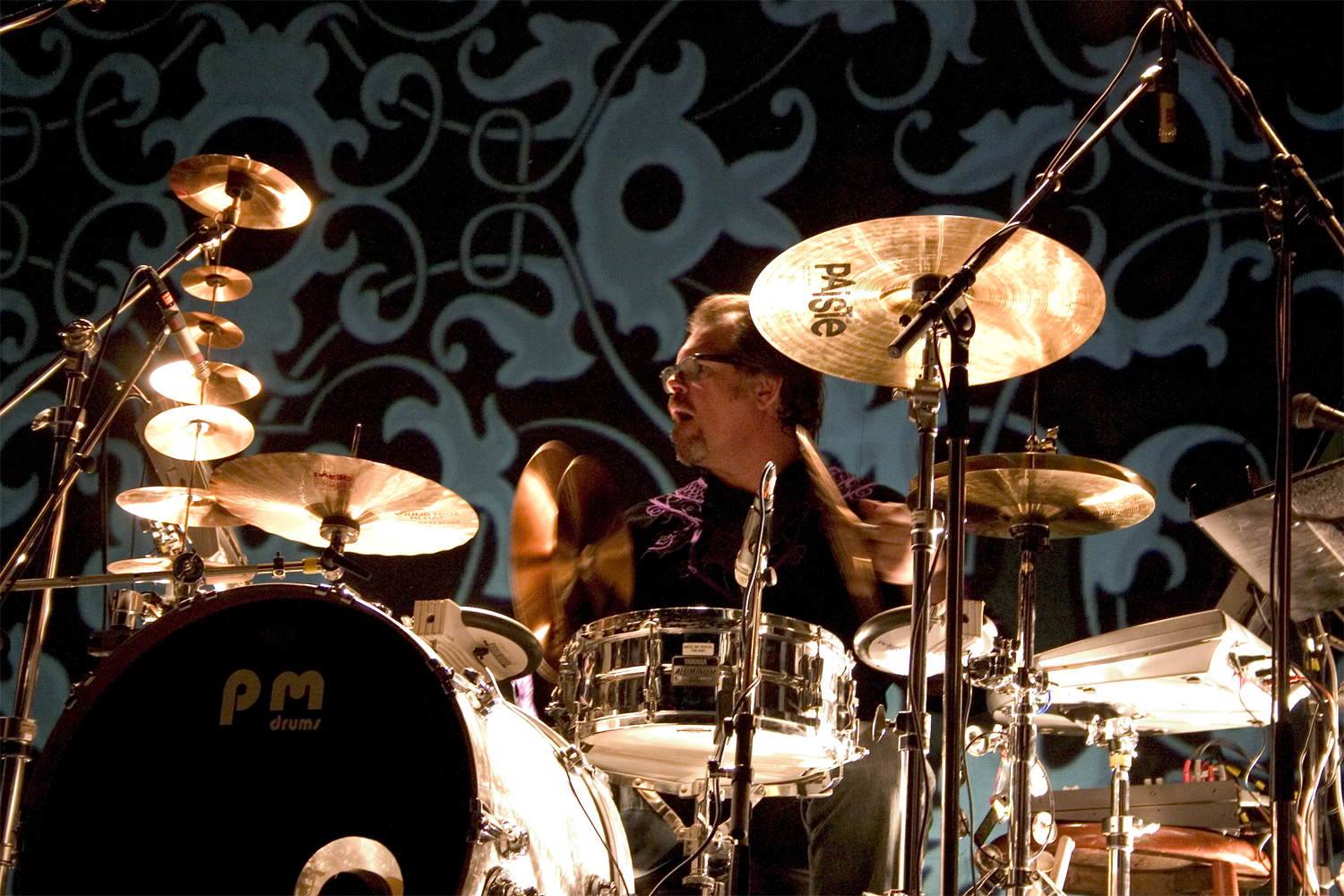
  Pat Mastelotto playing a kit with both acoustic and electronic drums, 2005
- Joseph San Mateo (Kairos)
- Keith Moon (The Who) Pollard Syndrum
- Jay Moore (Primal State) – Reality Resistant EP
- Stephen Morris (New Order & Joy Division)
- Jon Moss (Culture Club)
- Jim Mothersbaugh (Devo) – homemade electronic kit
- Alan Myers (Devo) – Used 2 Synares on the 1979, 1980, 1981, and 1982 tours. Additionally, he used a 7-piece all-Synare kit on the 1982 tour. He also used 2 Syndrums during the 1979 and 1980 tours.

== O–Z ==
- Nadeem-Shravan (Bollywood Composer Duo) who rocked the 1990s with their music. They extensively used combination of electronic drums with Conga Drums.
- Carl Palmer of Emerson, Lake & Palmer in the 1973 album Brain Salad Surgery, on the song "Toccata".
- Neil Peart (Rush) – used both Roland electronic drums and acoustic drums in his live solos, used Simmons SDSV from 1983 to 1989
- Mike Portnoy (Dream Theater – triggered kick, snare, and toms used on Images and Words)
- Nick Rice – Hadouken!, Leftfield, Throwing Snow
- Bill Rieflin (Ministry, Revolting Cocks, KMFDM & R.E.M.)
- Sean Reinert (Cynic)
- Ryuichi Sakamoto (Yellow Magic Orchestra)
- Christoph Schneider (Rammstein) – Hybryd Drum set During Herzeleid and Sehnsucht era
- Jez Strode (Kajagoogoo)
- Yukihiro Takahashi (Yellow Magic Orchestra) used Pollard Syndrum for Yellow Magic Orchestra debut album and 2nd Studio Album Solid State Survivor and for their 1978-1980 tour. He used Simmons SDSV for their 1983 final tour
- Roger Taylor of Queen played Syndrums from 1977 to 1981 and then Simmons pads from 1982 to 1985 in addition to his acoustic drum kit.
- Matt Tong of Bloc Party He uses electronic drums on the track "Compliments" and some pads in other songs from the 2005 album Silent Alarm.
- Chad Wackerman (Frank Zappa)
- Gary Wallis – Pink Floyd, Mike + The Mechanics, Schiller, Il Divo
- Alan White of Yes
- Alan Wilder – (Depeche Mode) – until his departure in 1995
- The Wiggles – Used on tours from 2011 to 2013, but not used in 2014.
