= Dancing with Tears in My Eyes (disambiguation) =

"Dancing with Tears in My Eyes" is a 1984 song by Ultravox.

It may also refer to:

- Dancing with Tears in My Eyes (album), a 1997 compilation album by Ultravox
- "Dancing with Tears in My Eyes", a 1930 song composed by Joseph (Joe) Burke and Al Dubin for the film Dancing Sweeties, also featured on the album, Under the Big Black Sun by X
- "Dancin' with Tears in My Eyes", a 1980 song by Carole King from the album Pearls: Songs of Goffin and King
- "Dancing with Tears in My Eyes", a 2010 song by Kesha from the album Animal
