= Visions in Blue =

Single by Ultravox

from the album Quartet
- B-side: "Break Your Back"; "Reap the Wild Wind" (Live)
- Released: March 11, 1983
- Recorded: 1982
- Studio: AIR (Salem, Montserrat)
- Genre: New wave, Synth-pop
- Length: 4:13 (single edit); 4:38 (album version)
- Label: Chrysalis
- Songwriters: Warren Cann; Chris Cross; Billy Currie; Midge Ure
- Producer: George Martin

Ultravox singles chronology
"Hymn" (1982)	"Visions in Blue" (1983)	"We Came to Dance" (1983)

"Visions in Blue" is Ultravox's third single from the Quartet (1982) album, recorded in AIR Studios in Montserrat and released on Chrysalis Records on March 11, 1983. The single peaked at #15 in the UK charts on March 26. A video was produced, but was banned by the BBC and MTV due to brief nudity; an edited version was later provided for broadcast on Top of the Pops.

The track also appears in live form on the CD version of Ultravox's 1983 in-concert album, Monument. The 12" version of "Visions in Blue" also contains an edited version of the same Monument performance of "Reap the Wild Wind".

== Critical reception ==
Deborah Steels of Smash Hits was impressed, reporting "this is 'Vox at their most polished...as good as anything they've ever done."

David Hepworth of Smash Hits reviewed the song negatively, saying it "sounded awfully dirge-like."

== Track listing ==
=== 7" version ===
1. "Visions in Blue" (single edit) – 4:13
2. "Break Your Back" – 3:31

=== 12" version ===
1. "Visions in Blue" - 4:38
2. "Reap the Wild Wind (live 6 Dec 82 at Hammersmith Odeon)" – 3:53
3. "Break Your Back" – 3:31
