= Electronic drum =

Musical instrument

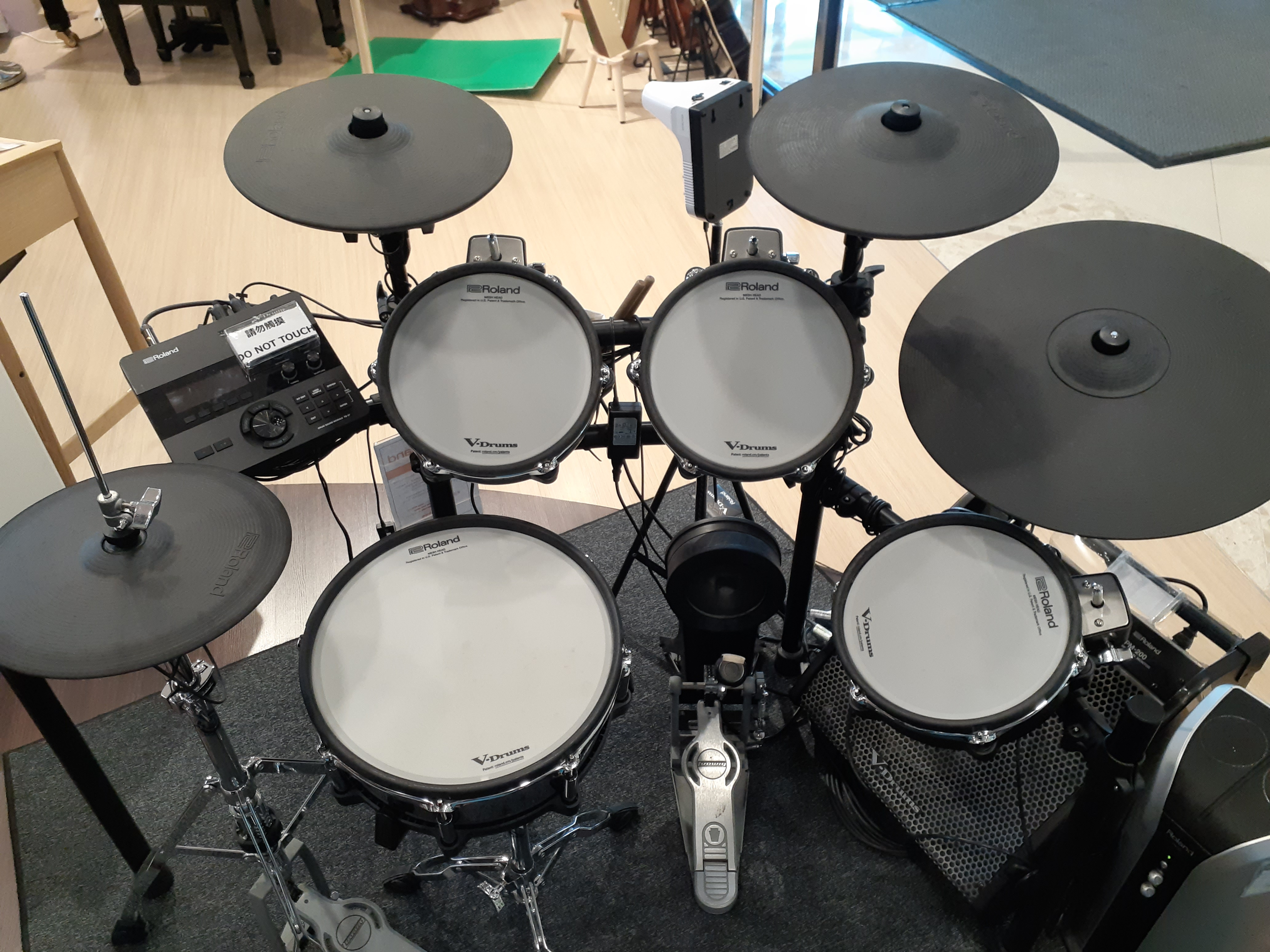
Roland TD-27KV2 Electronic drum kit

Electronic drums are an electronic musical instrument that replicates the sound and appearance of a drum kit or other percussion instruments. Electronic drums consist of an electronic sound module which produces the synthesized or sampled percussion sounds and a set of pads, usually constructed in a shape to resemble drums and cymbals, which are equipped with electronic sensors to send an electronic signal to the sound module which outputs a sound. Like acoustic drums, the pads are struck by drum sticks and they are played in a similar manner to an acoustic drum kit, albeit with some differences in the drumming experience.

The electronic drum (pad/triggering device) is usually sold as part of an electronic drum kit, consisting of a set of drum pads mounted on a stand or rack in a configuration similar to that of an acoustic drum kit layout, with rubberized (Roland, Yamaha, Alesis, for example) or specialized acoustic/electronic cymbals (e.g. Zildjian's "Gen 16"). The drum pads themselves are either discs or shallow drum shells made of various materials, often with a rubber/silicone or cloth-like coated playing surface that provides some rebound to sticks. Each pad has one or more sensors that generates an electronic signal when struck.

The electronic signal is transmitted through cables into an electronic or digital drum module ("brain" as it is sometimes called), synthesizer or other device, which then produces a sound associated with, and triggered by, the struck pad. The sound signal from the drum module can be plugged into a keyboard amp or PA system for use in a live band performance, listened to with headphones for silent practice, or patched into an audio mixer for a recording session. Since digital drums have become more popular in the 2000s, companies have started selling digital electronic drum kit sound files, referred to as "drum kits". While electronic drum kits are typically used to trigger drum and percussion sounds, a MIDI-equipped electronic drum kit can be used to trigger any types of MIDI sounds.

== History ==
=== 1970s ===
The first electronic drum was created in the early 1970s by Graeme Edge, drummer of The Moody Blues, in collaboration with Sussex University Professor Brian Groves. The device was used in the song "Procession" from the 1971 album Every Good Boy Deserves Favour.

The first commercial electronic drum was the Pollard Syndrum, released by Pollard Industries in 1976. It consisted of an electric sound generator with one or more drum pads. It quickly caught the attention of numerous high-profile drummers/percussionists at the time, such as Carmine Appice, Chester Thompson and Terry Bozzio. However, the Syndrum was a financial failure and the company failed in the following years.

In 1978, the Simmons company was created to produce commercial electronic drums sets. Its most notable product was the Simmons SDSV, released in 1981. With its characteristic hexagon-shaped pads, the SDSV was first used by Richard James Burgess on From the Tea-rooms of Mars ...., "Chant No. 1" by Spandau Ballet, and "Angel Face" by Shock. After its debut on the top musical chart shows and parades, this electronic instrument garnered significant attention from established and influential rock/pop musicians. The sound of the SDSV is often described retrospectively with phrases such as "awful" or "sounded like trash can lids" by those who employed them at the time. Despite the critics, the distinctive Simmons sound was extensively used during the 1980s by pop/rock & synth-pop groups such as Duran Duran and progressive rock bands such as Rush, among others. Simmons drums are often viewed somewhat nostalgically by those who began to experiment with these early forays into electronic drums and percussion.

=== 1980s-1990s ===
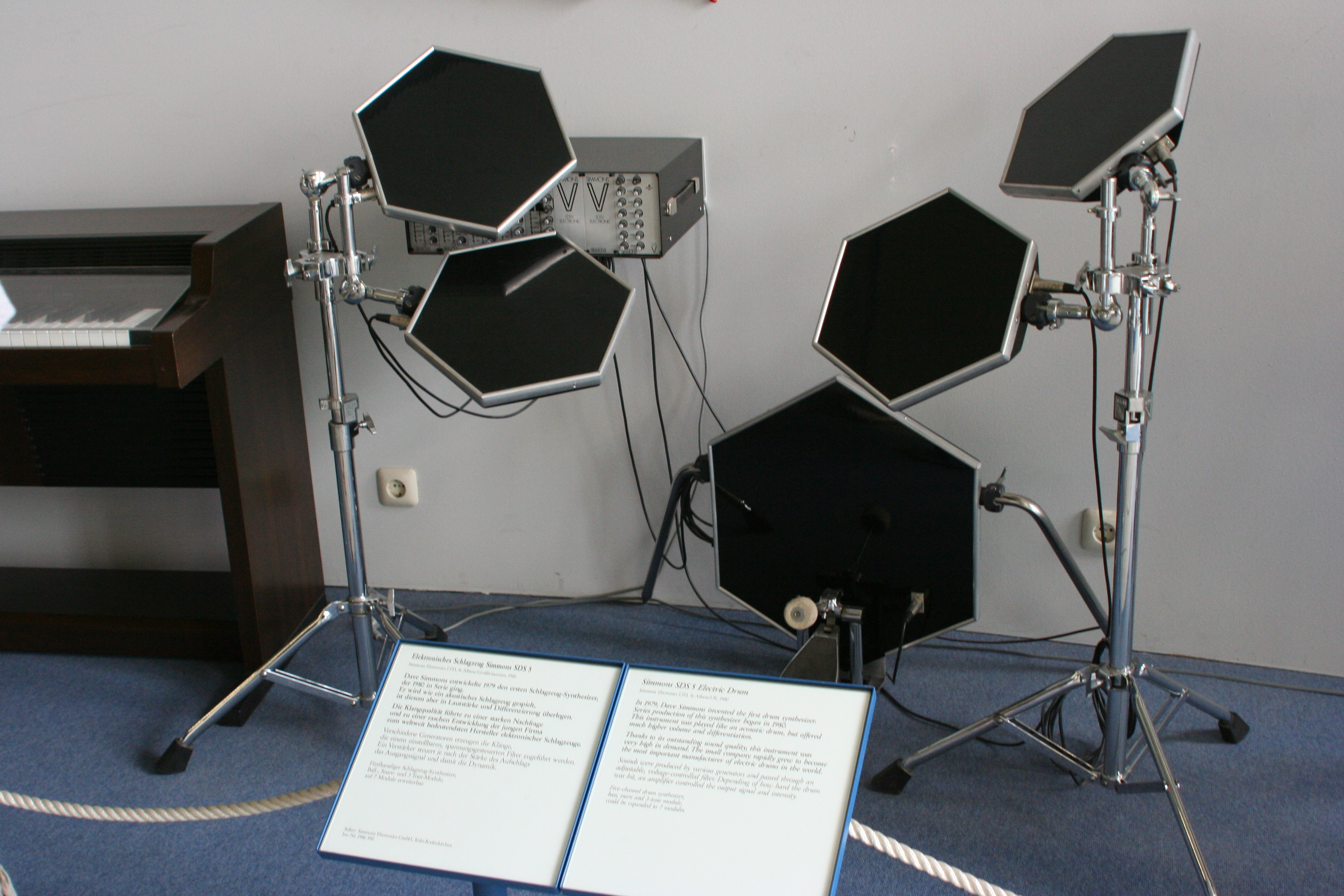
Early Simmons SDSV Electronic Drums, ca. 1983

In the following 1980s, other companies started selling their own versions of Simmons' electronic drums, notably Pearl, Roland and Yamaha. At that time, electronic drums were similar to today's starter or entry-level kits. They consisted of rubber-coated sensor pads mounted on stands. The pads were created to be velocity-sensitive and the sound was generated through single or multiple-layered sampling or synthesized sound.

In 1997, Roland introduced its TD-10 model, which had two major musical and electronic innovations. The first and more controversial innovation was its method of providing noises for the drums/pads to trigger, instead of generating its sound by using samples of an acoustic drum or cymbal. The TD-10 used mathematical models to generate tones using synthesizers. While some drummers lamented the fact that the produced sound was not a "pure" sample of an acoustic instrument, others argued that simple replication of an acoustic drum was not desirable. Secondly, instead of rubber-coated pads, Roland featured a new mesh-like pad, produced in collaboration with acoustic drum skin manufacturer Remo.

The mesh-head pads look and feel approximately like a smaller-sized acoustic drum (although the wooden shell is much smaller). The Remo/Roland mesh surface is made from a double layer of taut woven mesh fibers, fitted with several electronic sensors or triggers. The playing feel is close to that of striking an acoustic drum, but with more bounce than an acoustic skin. Roland termed its commercial drum set "V-Drums", which later became the marketed brand name of its electronic drum line. Together, the mathematical/computational modeling, mesh-head pad surface, and improved trigger sensor technology greatly increased the quality of sounds, the "realistic" feel of electronic drums, and the volume levels in practice and live show settings.

=== 2000s-2010s ===
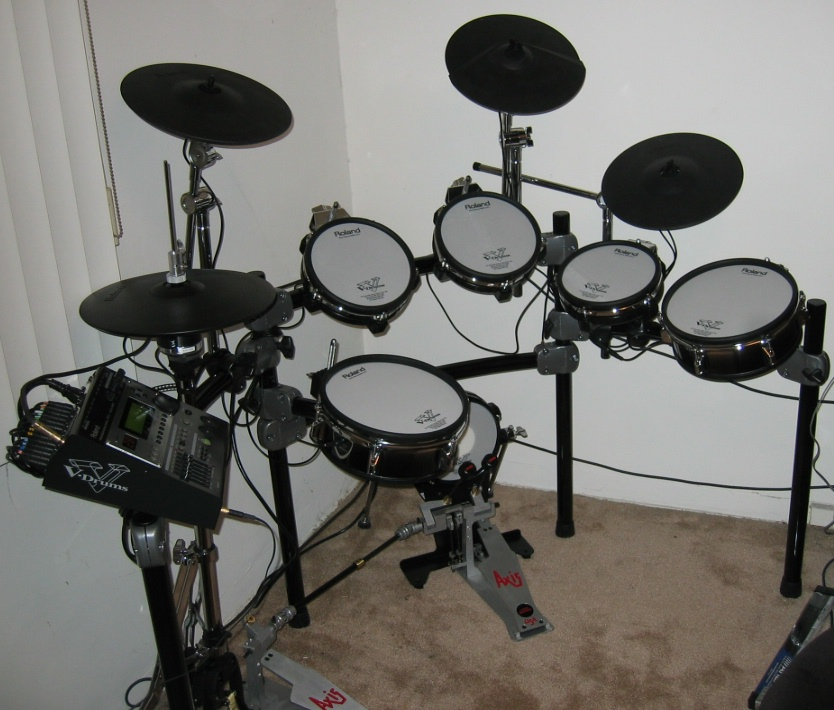
Roland V-Stage Series TD-12S V-Drum Kit. On the left is the "brain", the module that controls the drum sounds and enables the performer to select from different types of drum kit and control the volume.

In the 2010s drum kits from major manufacturers have therefore addressed many of the shortcomings of early electronic drum pads and modules. While each of the significant market brands have entry-level units, the professionally marketed kits are geared toward creating sounds and playing experiences that are nearly indistinguishable from playing a quality acoustic kit or world/orchestral percussion instruments. Examples of these high-end professional kits include the Yamaha DTX 950k and Roland V-Drums TD-30KV.

Professional kits generally have higher-quality digital sounds These drum modules offer high quality modeled drum sounds – with hundreds of onboard sounds, effects and audio loops and song options/patterns to choose from. Some of these modules allow the user to select tuning, head type, depth/width and material (metal, wood type, etc.). Trigger sensor/reliability and reduction of crosstalk have been vastly improved. Triggering now allows both the head and the rim to produce different sounds, facilitating rim and cross shots as well as shell tapping and many other audio sounds that can be assigned to the head or rim, so that the options for live music increase even more. Cymbals can accommodate more zones: for edge, bow and bell strikes with different sounds, with choking capability and realistic cymbal swells.

They have more realistic hi-hats - Acoustic hi-hat cymbals are mounted on in a pair on a stand with a foot pedal enabling the drummer to open and close the hi-hats, which enables drummers to create a wide variety of hi-hat effects, depending on whether the pair of cymbals are fully closed, partially closed, or open. These newer electronic versions are no longer single cymbal pads as in the 3000s, but dual replicated cymbals, that can be mounted on regular stands like their acoustic versions. These cymbals allow for actual opened and closed hand/foot playing. An electronic module detects hi-hat movement/height and position, providing realistic variations of hi-hat sound via degree of placement – open, partially open, and closed hi-hat strikes. Some modules, like the Roland TD-30, also feature foot close and quick close-open sounds, with pressure on the cymbals also being sensed and replicated when tightening or loosening the foot pressure, even on a closed hi-hat. So, the audio sounds tighter when firm pressure is applied on an already closed hi-hat pedal.

== Elements ==
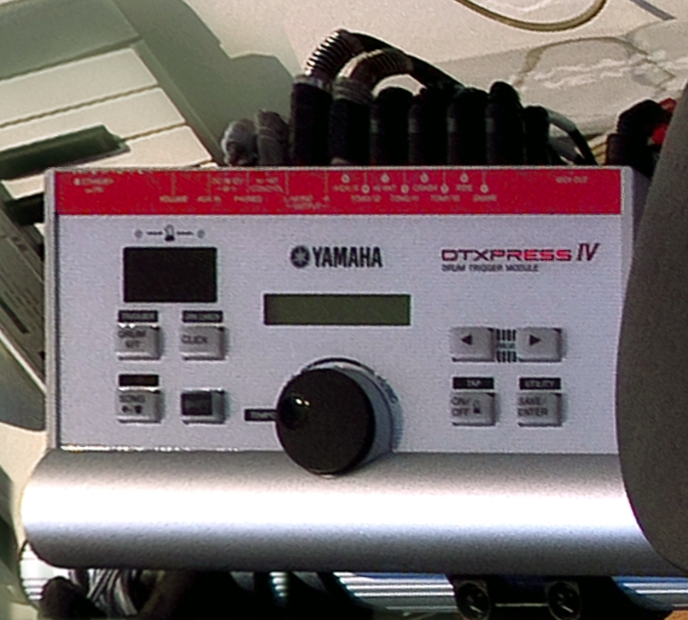
The drum module for the Yamaha DTxpress IV electronic drum kit

=== Sensors and pads ===
Electronic drums typically use piezoelectric sensors to detect the vibration of the drummer's impact. The sensors convert strain to a voltage which can be measured by the electronics. These piezoelectric sensors are then embedded in a silicone or rubber pad or cymbal, or attached to the underside of a drumhead. The sensor-embedded pads and plastic cymbals are mounted on a stand or on multiple stands, so that the drummer can put them in the desired position.

=== Drum module ===
The electronic drum module is the equivalent to the synth module for electronic drums. It contains the electronic and digital circuitry which produces the synthesized drum sound or the triggered samples. The drum module has a number of faders, buttons and knobs on the front or top so that the drummer can make changes. There is usually some type of display, to give the drummer information about the settings and status. This may include an LCD or LED screen and individual LEDs that light up when sensors are triggered. The drum module is typically mounted on a stand, so that the drummer can easily reach it and see its display and other visual indicators. On the rear or top of the drum module is a patch bay, with a number of labelled jacks for plugging in the sensors, audio outs, and MIDI in or outs.

Drum modules typically contain "drum kit" presets in their memory. Each drum kit has different sounds, such as jazz drums played with a "brushes" sound, rock drums, Latin drums, African drums, or 1980s-era drum machine synthesized drum sounds (like the TR-808 kick drum sound, for example). Some electronic drum modules, such as Roland's TD-12, even include non-drum sounds, such as organ, electric bass, orchestra, and so on, which can be triggered using the drum kit sensors. Some presets also include effects appropriate to the drum kit or its associated genre. The drum module may also contain effect units, such as audio compression, reverb, and equalization. The drum module may offer controls to adjust the sensitivity of the different pads and cymbals, change the sound of the tuning of the drums, adjust the "buzz" of the snare, the muffling of the bass drum, and so on. Some drum modules incorporate features of drum machines or sequencers, such as the capability to play pre-programmed drum beats, so that the live drummer can play along with them.

=== Sound system ===
Some electronic drum manufacturers sell electronic drum-specific combination amplifiers, which contain a power amplifier and one or more speakers in a wooden, wedge-shaped cabinet. The wedge shape is designed so that the speaker is directed at a seated drummer, much like a vocalist's monitor speaker will often be wedge-shaped. Some electronic drummers use keyboard amplifiers or PA systems (both of which are full-range systems). For individual practice, headphones can be connected to the drum module's headphone jack.

=== Other gear ===
A bass drum pedal may be needed in some kits with a separate bass drum pad, whereas other cheaper kits may simply have a pedal with a trigger inside, and no bass drum pad. Additionally, some electronic cymbals, especially the hi-hats, can be mounted on regular cymbal stands. Drummers also use accessories, such as a drum throne and drum sticks.

== Variations ==
=== Table-top electronic drum ===
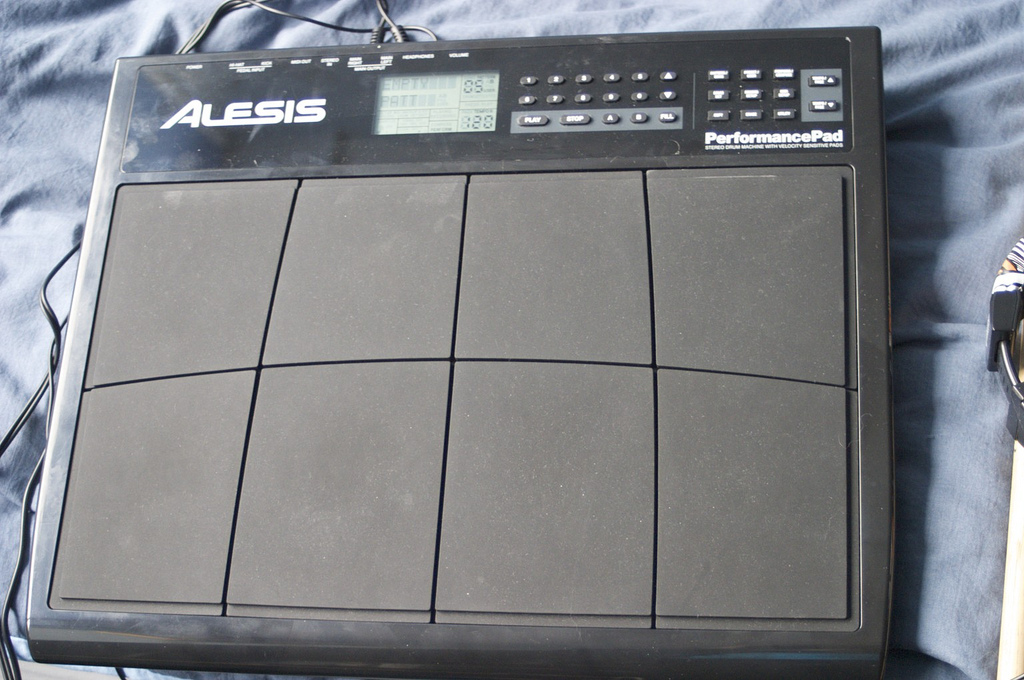
Alesis PerformancePad electronic drum kit

A table-top electronic drum (or portable electronic drum) is an electronic drum that has all of its pads (except foot pedals) and the electronic sound module combined in a single table-top unit. It may have a small amplifier and small loudspeakers incorporated so that it can be used at jam sessions without plugging into a PA system. The sound generation is generally simpler (single-layered samples) when compared to more expensive, full-size electronic kits. Also, the feel when playing a table-top drum/pad is very different from using a full-size electronic kit or an acoustic kit. The advantages of table-top drums are their portability and the relatively lower price.

Some acoustic drummers use a table-top electronic drum as their first foray into electronic drumming, since purchasing a single table-top unit and setting it up alongside an acoustic drum kit is much cheaper and simpler than fitting an entire acoustic kit with sensors and connecting them to a "drum brain" module. With a table-top drum mounted on a stand, a drummer who has an otherwise acoustic drum kit could add different drum and percussion sounds to her playing, such as synthesized drum sounds, or samples of a percussion instrument that would otherwise be impractical to have onstage (e.g., a large gong).

=== Acoustic triggered drum kit ===
An acoustic triggered drum kit is a regular acoustic drum kit coupled with drum triggers (sensors) on the drums and cymbals. The triggers can be "built inside" or permanently fixed on to cymbals–so that they are necessarily either: fixed triggers (electronic kit essentially), removable (can be either acoustic or electronic by default of purpose at the time), or simply an acoustic kit that is now actually a "Hybrid" kit–using external triggers that attach to the rim and skin (or batter head) so as to trigger other sounds on top of the natural acoustic sound produced or simply to boost it for performance.

The triggers detect hits/ vibrations on the batter head and/or hoop rim and generate an electric signal. The signal is then sent to an electronic module/sampler or via cables and an Audio Interface to MIDI-DAW/drum software on a PC/laptop/Mac–to trigger the selected sounds. Usually, the "acoustic triggered kit" has either commercially available mesh head "skins" (silent), or the drummer keeps her natural skins (using acoustic skins for a Hybrid kit are standard practice) and other muting accessories to reduce the acoustic sounds generated when played. This way, an acoustic (electro/acoustic) or Hybrid triggered drum kit has the feel and sizes of the standard acoustic kit but with the added benefits of an electronic kit's onstage silence, controllable volume (an important factor in small venues) or the added sound library available in 2016-era high-end kits, which includes sounds for large gongs and other instruments that are expensive and hard to transport in their original acoustic form. DrumsAnywhere software uses a single piezoelectric microphone, to trigger eight different drum pads on any flat or irregular surface, such as a table or wooden chair.

=== Hybrid kit ===
Some drummers have a mixture of acoustic drums and cymbals and electronic drum equipment (sensor pads and a "drum brain"). For example, a drummer who finds that their cymbals are too loud in the small venues they play in may use electronic cymbals, but acoustic drums otherwise. On the other end of the spectrum, a drummer who has mostly electronic drums may add a few acoustic drums or cymbals to the kit to add timbral variety or "colour".

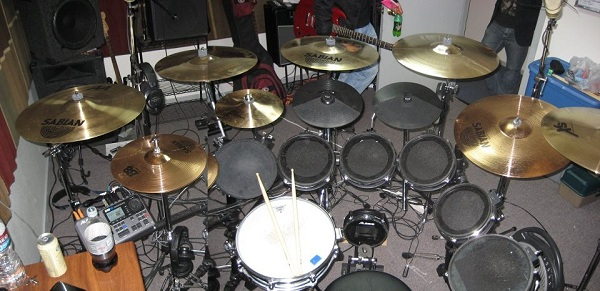
This hybrid kit mixes traditional acoustic instruments with sensor-equipped electronic drum gear.

=== Motion capture kit ===
Aerodrums is a motion capture system that allows a drummer to perform without a kit physically present. A high speed camera captures the drummer's motions and converts them into electronic signals that can trigger drum samples. Senstroke is a similar system that uses bluetooth technology.

== Selected notable users ==
The List of electronic drum performers gives a sense of the wide range of genres of the musical artists and bands who incorporate electronic drums into their shows and recordings. The list ranges from progressive rock (Bill Bruford of King Crimson and Yes) and (Phil Collins of Genesis and in his solo career) and nu metal (Rob Bourdon of Linkin Park) to reggae (Sly Dunbar of Black Uhuru) and alternative music (Alan Wilder of Depeche Mode).
