= Vienna (Ultravox song) =

1981 single by Ultravox

Single by Ultravox

from the album Vienna
- B-side: "Passionate Reply"; "Herr X" (12-inch single only)
- Released: January 9, 1981
- Recorded: 1980
- Studio: RAK, London, UK
- Genre: Synth-pop; new wave; avant-pop
- Length: 4:37 (single edit); 4:53 (album and 12-inch version)
- Label: Chrysalis
- Songwriters: Warren Cann; Chris Cross; Billy Currie; Midge Ure
- Producers: Conny Plank; Ultravox

Ultravox singles chronology
"Passing Strangers" (1980)	"Vienna" (1981)	"All Stood Still" (1981)

"Vienna" is a song by British new wave band Ultravox, released on January 9, 1981 by Chrysalis Records as the third single and the title track from their fourth studio album of the same name (1980). The new wave ballad, which features Midge Ure on lead vocals, is regarded as a staple of the synth-pop genre that was popularised in the early 1980s, and remains both the band's signature song and their most commercially successful release.

The song was also performed at the 1985 Live Aid concert in Wembley Stadium, and is often performed live by Ure in solo performances.

== Background ==
Written in January 1980, "Vienna" has a dramatic grand piano in the verses and chorus, and a viola solo in the middle of the song. Other sounds include a solid synth bass line played on a MiniMoog, an Elka string synthesiser and a Roland CR-78 drum machine. The drum machine pattern created by Warren Cann was the basis of the song. Cann and the classically trained Billy Currie together wanted to create something that might sound like it had been written by a late-19th-century romantic composer, so they started creating the basic chords and sounds of the song, and the romantic viola solo was influenced by German composer Max Reger.

The lyrics, which describe a brief love affair in the city of Vienna, were quickly written by Midge Ure. According to Currie, Ure was hesitant about the overly classical romantic feel of the orchestration, and said: "This means nothing to me", to which the producer Conny Plank replied: "Well, sing that then." Ure said that, when he went into the studio, he had in his mind only the line "The feeling is gone, this means nothing to me – oh Vienna!". Then he wrote the vocal part while bass player Chris Cross started playing some bass lines with his synthesizer.

In interviews at the time it was said that the song took its inspiration from the 1949 film The Third Man, in which the Austrian capital plays a central role, but Midge Ure later admitted he made that up when asked what the song was about. In his 2004 autobiography, If I Was, Ure wrote that the song's central line, "this means nothing to me, Vienna", came to him after Brenda Hempstead, the wife of his former manager Gerry Hempstead, told him he needed to write "a song like that Vienna", confusing the title with Fleetwood Mac's "Rhiannon". Ure is said to have been influenced by the Walker Brothers' 1978 single "The Electrician".

Ure said of the track: "We wanted to take the song and make it incredibly pompous in the middle, leaving it very sparse before and after, but finishing with a typically over-the top classical ending."

Ure recalled that when the band played the song to Conny Plank, the producer said the melody reminded him of "an old man and an empty ballroom by a piano"; Ure credited Plank with creating the song's piano sound, which he described as "very haunting".

The band's record company Chrysalis Records was reluctant to release "Vienna" as a single, saying the song was too long, too experimental and too overblown; the band refused to re-edit it, and Chrysalis released "Passing Strangers" instead.

== Release and chart performance ==
The single spent four consecutive weeks at No. 2 on the UK Singles Chart, kept off the top spot by John Lennon's "Woman" for a week and then by Joe Dolce's "Shaddap You Face" for a further three weeks. It was certified gold by the British Phonographic Industry (BPI) in February 1981, denoting sales of over 500,000 copies in the UK, and eventually became the UK's sixth-best-selling single of 1981. The single topped the charts in Belgium, Ireland and the Netherlands.

It was voted Britain's favourite single ever to peak at No. 2 on the charts in a 2012 poll by BBC Radio 2 and the Official Charts Company (OCC), and was also awarded an honorary No. 1 by the OCC.

In 2017, Ure declined an opportunity to meet Dolce, saying: "I've had 40 years of people talking about Joe 'Bloody' Dolce and I don't want to spend what I've got left talking about when I met him."

== Legacy ==
OMD frontman Andy McCluskey lauded the track, saying that "it stops you dead" and is "so cool and so moody and melancholy."

Chris Roberts of Prog wrote in 2025 that "the success of Vienna was a major factor in synths becoming part of pop music's fabric", and that while the Vienna album helped break "the chart barriers against synthesisers", the single "became a watershed". Ure has pushed back on the song's reputation as an electronic track, saying that despite its electronic drums and synthesised bass "it's mainly piano, violin and viola". He called its success "a double-edged sword" that took the band to big venues but left people expecting "Vienna 2 or Vienna 3", which Ultravox refused to make, and said the song was "a highlight" but "nowhere near the best song I've written". Currie said that among his own work it is "way up there".

== Music video ==
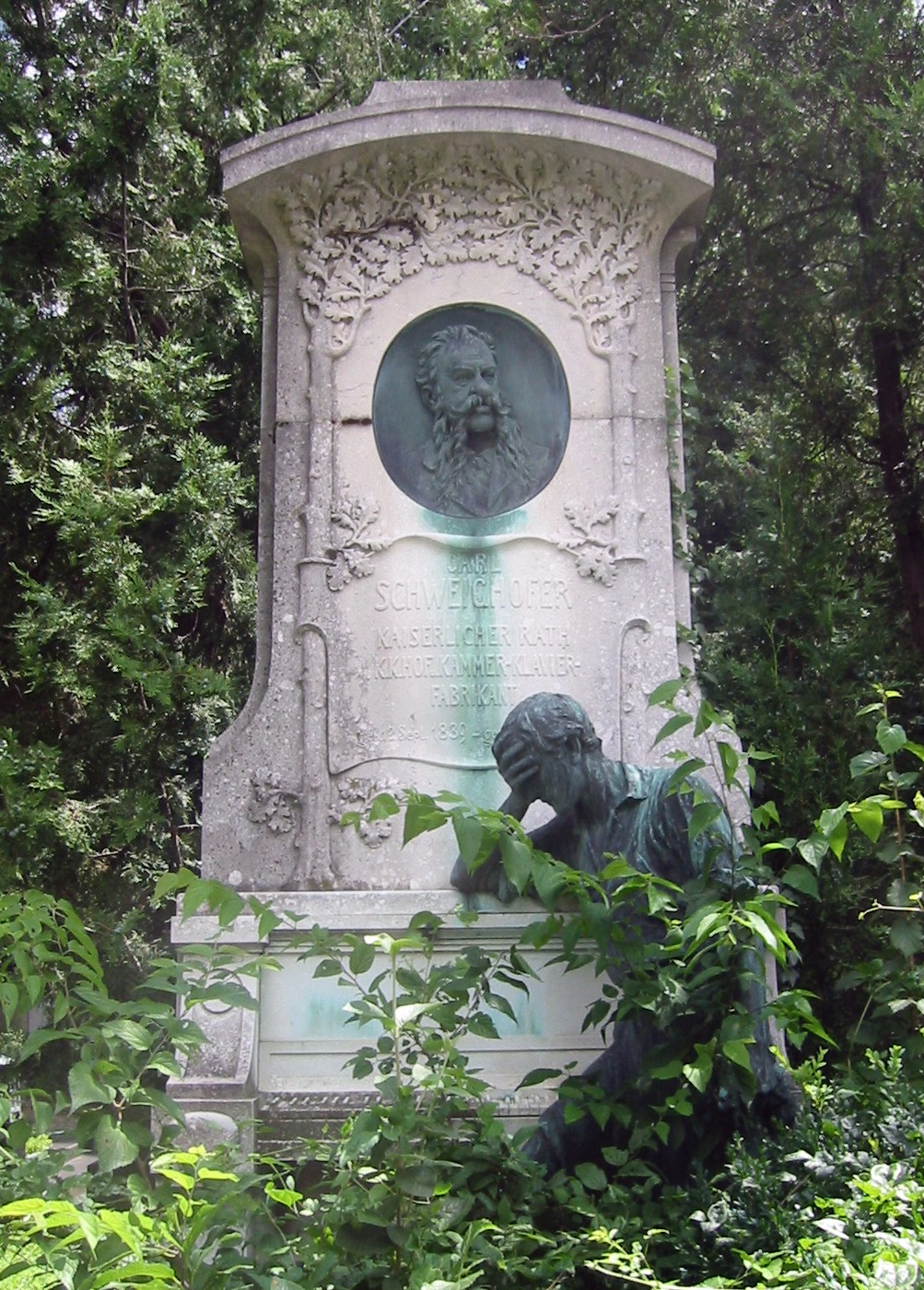
The grave of Carl Schweighofer in 2009

The music video, directed by Russell Mulcahy, is particularly evocative of The Third Man. It was Ultravox's second video, after "Passing Strangers" (also with Mulcahy), and cost £6,000–£7,000, footed by the band after Chrysalis refused to fund it.

The gravestone that is shown in the video and on the single cover is part of the grave of the Austrian piano manufacturer Carl Schweighofer, and is located in the Zentralfriedhof in Vienna. The city's cathedral and Michaelerplatz square also feature, although the video was mostly filmed in London's Covent Garden.

== B-sides ==
The B-side to the single is "Passionate Reply". It was recorded in August 1980 at Criteria Studios in Miami, on their American tour. Cann said to Jonas Wårstad about the track: "The B-side of the 7", 'Passionate Reply' was a promising song, perhaps it needed some 'living with' before we would've considered it finished. As it was, we thought it made a good B-side."

The 12-inch single includes "Herr X", a version of the Kraftwerk-esque album track "Mr. X" sung entirely in German by Warren Cann with the aid of native German producer Conny Plank. Both tracks were included on the remastered CD version of the Vienna album as bonus tracks.

== Reissue ==
"Vienna"
- CD single #1

Single by Ultravox

from the album If I Was: The Very Best of Midge Ure & Ultravox
- B-side: "Wastelands"; "The Voice"; "One Small Day"; "Hymn"; "Answers to Nothing"; "Call of the Wild"
- Released: January 25, 1993
- Recorded: February 1980
- Studio: RAK, London
- Length: 4:37
- Label: Chrysalis
- Songwriters: Warren Cann; Chris Cross; Billy Currie; Midge Ure
- Producers: Ultravox; Conny Plank

Ultravox singles chronology
"Vienna 92" (1992)	"Vienna" (1993)	"I Am Alive" (1993)

On January 25, 1993 "Vienna" was re-released by Chrysalis, to promote the Midge Ure/Ultravox greatest hits compilation If I Was: The Very Best of Midge Ure & Ultravox. This reissue peaked at number 13 on the UK Singles Chart. Like the compilation album, the single also included songs by Midge Ure (as B-sides).

== Track listings ==
All songs written and composed by Warren Cann, Chris Cross, Billy Currie, and Midge Ure, except where noted.

=== 1981 ===
7-inch vinyl

- UK, Australia: Chrysalis / CHS 2481
- Germany, Netherlands: Chrysalis / 102 905

Side one
No.	Title	Length
1.	"Vienna" (Single edit)	4:37

Side two
No.	Title	Length
1.	"Passionate Reply"	4:17

12-inch vinyl

- UK, France: Chrysalis / CHS 12 2481
- Germany: Chrysalis / 600 352-213
- Netherlands: Chrysalis / 12.2481

Side one
No.	Title	Length
1.	"Vienna"	4:53

Side two
No.	Title	Length
1.	"Passionate Reply"	4:17
2.	"Herr X"	5:49

=== 1993 ===
CD

- UK: Chrysalis / CDCHS 3936
- UK: Chrysalis / CDCHSS 3936 ("Limited edition collectors pack CD1 of a 2CD set", with space for the second CD)

No.	Title	Writer(s)	Artist	Length
1.	"Vienna"		Ultravox	4:37
2.	"Answers to Nothing"	Ure	Midge Ure	3:40
3.	"The Voice"		Ultravox	4:24
4.	"Wastelands"	Ure; Daniel Mitchell	Midge Ure	4:22

UK: Chrysalis / CDCHS 3937

No.	Title	Writer(s)	Artist	Length
1.	"Vienna"		Ultravox	4:37
2.	"Call of the Wild"	Ure	Midge Ure	4:18
3.	"One Small Day"		Ultravox	4:27
4.	"Hymn"		Ultravox	4:24

== Charts ==
=== Weekly charts ===
Weekly chart performance for "Vienna"
Chart (1981)	Peak position
Australia (Kent Music Report)	11
Austria (Ö3 Austria Top 40)	8
Belgium (Ultratop 50 Flanders)	1
Ireland (IRMA)	1
Netherlands (Dutch Top 40)	1
Netherlands (Single Top 100)	1
New Zealand (Recorded Music NZ)	2
South Africa (Springbok Radio)	8
Sweden (Sverigetopplistan)	7
UK Singles (Official Charts)	2
West Germany (GfK)	14

Weekly chart performance for "Vienna" (1993 reissue)
Chart (1993)	Peak position
Europe (Eurochart Hot 100 Singles)	50
Ireland (IRMA)	20
UK Singles (Official Charts)	13

=== Year-end charts ===
Year-end chart performance for "Vienna"
Chart (1981)	Position
Australia (Kent Music Report)	66
Belgium (Ultratop 50 Flanders)	9
Netherlands (Dutch Top 40)	8
Netherlands (Single Top 100)	5
New Zealand (Recorded Music NZ)	30
UK Singles (OCC)	6
West Germany (Official German Charts)	64

== Certifications ==
Certifications for "Vienna"
Region	Certification	Certified units/sales
United Kingdom (BPI)	Gold	500,000^{^}
^{^} Shipments figures based on certification alone.

== "Vienna 92" ==
"Vienna 92"

Single by Ultravox
- B-side: "Systems of Love"
- Released: March 24, 1992
- Recorded: Berwick Street (London)
- Genre: Synth-pop; electronic
- Length: 4:35 (The classic mix); 7:31 (Goodnight Vienna remix)
- Label: ZYX
- Songwriters: Warren Cann; Chris Cross; Billy Currie; Midge Ure
- Producers: Ultravox; Rod Gammons

Ultravox singles chronology
"All in One Day" (1987)	"Vienna 92" (1992)	"Vienna" (1993)

In March 1992, a re-recorded version of "Vienna", by a new Ultravox line-up, was released as a single in Germany. This line-up consisted of original Ultravox member Billy Currie on keyboards, violin and percussion, and Tony Fenelle on vocals, guitar and percussion. The backing vocals on B-side "Systems of Love" were performed by Alison Limerick and Jackie Williams. The single did not chart. It was not included in the album Revelation.

=== Track listings ===
12-inch vinyl

Germany: ZYX / 6767-12

Side one
No.	Title	Writer(s)	Length
1.	"Vienna 92" (Goodnight Vienna remix)	Warren Cann; Chris Cross; Billy Currie; Midge Ure	7:31

Side two
No.	Title	Writer(s)	Length
1.	"Vienna 92" (The classic mix)	Cann; Cross; Currie; Ure	4:35
2.	"Systems of Love"	Currie; Rod Gammons; Tony Fenelle	4:31

CD

Germany: ZYX / 6767-8

No.	Title	Writer(s)	Length
1.	"Vienna 92" (The classic mix)	Cann; Cross; Currie; Ure	4:35
2.	"Vienna 92" (Goodnight Vienna remix)	Cann; Cross; Currie; Ure	7:31
3.	"Systems of Love"	Currie; Gammons; Fenelle	4:31

== Cover versions ==
=== Vic Reeves ===
In 1992, comedian Vic Reeves (Jim Moir) appeared on the album Ruby Trax – The NME's Roaring Forty, singing a version of the song with different lyrics in the verses. The compilation was released by NME, a magazine that had been publishing single charts since 1952, with all records covered having reached the number-one slot in their own charts during 40 years of publication. As "Vienna" by Ultravox reached number one on the NME charts on 21 February 1981 (staying at the top for one week) it was eligible for inclusion within the concept of the project, where it would not have been allowed if NME had been following the British Market Research Bureau/Gallup chart (now branded as the Official Chart).

Take That notably sampled a section of "Vienna" on their track "Eight Letters" in 2010.
