= Extended Ultravox =

Compilation album by Ultravox
- Released: February 16, 1998
- Genre: Synth-pop
- Length: 69:48
- Label: EMI
- Producer: Ultravox

Ultravox chronology
Dancing with Tears in My Eyes (1995)	Extended Ultravox (1998)	The Island Years (1999)

Professional ratings
Review scores
Source	Rating
AllMusic	4/5 stars

Extended Ultravox is an Ultravox compilation of 12" extended versions of various Ultravox singles from the years 1980–1986 (the period with Midge Ure as frontman). The album was released on February 16, 1998.

The tracks on the disc are all extended mixes of Ultravox singles, available on their respective 12" versions. The notable exception to this is "Serenade" – a non-single track from Quartet. The "special re-mix" of this track was previously available on a remix LP available with limited copies of The Collection in 1984.

The rest of the remixes and extended versions that Ultravox made are available on the Rare compilations or as bonus tracks on various Ultravox album CD re-issues.

== Track listing ==
1. "All Stood Still" (12" Version) – 5:08
2. "Reap the Wild Wind (Extended Version)" – 4:45
3. "We Came to Dance (Extended Version)" – 7:37
4. "Serenade (Special Re-Mix)" – 6:04
5. "One Small Day (Special Re-Mix)" – 7:50
6. "Dancing With Tears in My Eyes (Special Re-Mix)" – 10:02
7. "Lament (Extended Mix)" – 8:03
8. "Love's Great Adventure (Extended Version)" – 5:42
9. "Same Old Story (Extended Version)" – 6:59
10. "All Fall Down (Extended Mix)" – 7:41

== Personnel ==
- Chris Cross – bass, synthesisers, vocals (1974–1987, 2008–present)
- Warren Cann – drums, electronic percussion, vocals (1974–1986, 2008–present)
- Billy Currie – keyboards, synthesisers, violin, viola (1974–1987, 1992–1996, 2008–present)
- Midge Ure – lead vocals, guitar, keyboards (1979–1987, 2008–present)

Production

- Artwork [Original Album Artwork Sections] – Glenn Travis, Michael Nash Associates, Peter Saville Associates
- Composed By – Billy Currie, Chris Cross, Midge Ure, Warren Cann (tracks: 1 to 8)
- Design – Extreme Voice
- Photography By [Cover] – David Bailey
- Photography By [Inlay] – Pete Wood
