= Schweighofer =

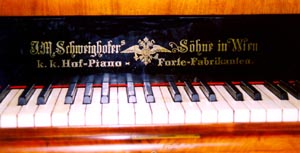
- A J. M. Schweighofer's Söhne piano of 1869
- Formerly: Schweighofer und Promberger
- Founded: 1792
- Founder: Michael Schweighofer
- Headquarters: Vienna, Austria

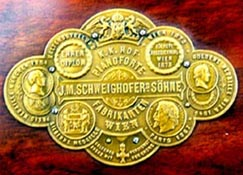
Cast iron plate of J. M. Schweighofer's Söhne on piano

Schweighofer was a piano manufacturer from Vienna, Austria.

== History ==
Schweighofer is one of Vienna's most famous piano houses, as well as its oldest, having been established in 1792 by Michael Schweighofer (1771–1809). The company applied many innovations in the early history of piano manufacture. Schweighofer won the gold medal at the Vienna exhibition of 1845. It has a history of producing highly respected instruments; in 1845, it was granted the status of official piano maker to the Emperor of Austria.

Michael Schweighofer came from Rincha, Bavaria and moved to Vienna, where he opened his piano company in 1792, becoming a citizen in 1801. The only extant instrument made by him survives in the Kunsthistorisches Museum of Vienna. He was married to Anna Wißgill Schweighofer (1780–1822) with whom he had three children.

After Michael Schweighofer's premature death in 1809, the business was carried on by his widow Anna Wißgill Schweighofer (1780–1822) who remarried the piano maker Joseph Promberger. The firm was known as Schweighofer und Promberger. Michael's son, Johann Michael (1806–1852, Vienna), probably learned his craft from Promberger. Then he traveled as a journeyman to England, France and Germany, returning to Vienna in 1832 to carry on the piano business under the Schweighofer name. Johann Michael Schweighofer applied enhanced knowledge and techniques diligently to the piano manufacture, leading to the winning of the gold medal at the Vienna exhibition of 1845. The pianos he built bear the inscription "J. M. Schweighofer [in Wien]"

Subsequently, the business was carried on by the third and fourth generations: After Johann Michael's death in 1852, his oldest son Carl Schweighofer (1839–1905) took over the company. Under his management, the company won further prizes at the German industry exhibition in Munich, 1854, and at the World Exhibition in Paris, 1867. The same year, Carl's brother Johann Michael (1840–1899) joined the company. Their pianos bore the inscription "J. M. Schweighofer's Söhne in Wien". In 1869 the company was awarded the title "k.k. Hof-Pianoforte-Fabrikanten" by the Viennese imperial court and in 1873 it received the Honorary diploma of the Vienna World Exhibition. In 1906, Carl's son Johann took over the company.

In 1911/1912 the J. M. Schweighofer's Söhne company was sold to the piano dealer Bernhard Kohn and his associate Friedrich Karbach, a musician and composer, presumed to be a former employee of Schweighofer. Later they were joined by dr. Oskar Karbach. Around the same time, a presumed descendant of the Schweighofer family opened a parallel factory (Johann Michael Schweighofer GmbH) and built pianos under the Schweighofer name, which led to legal complications. To distinguish their pianos, Kohn & Karbach put sometime after 1920 the Schweighofer Original inscription on their instruments and added the Karbach name on the soundboards. 1938 Karbach and Kohn, who were Jewish, were expropriated under the Nazi regime and the company was subsequently led by Friedrich Ehrbar jr., another Viennese piano maker, until 1940 when it was closed. The other company, owned by the Schweighofer family descendant, also disappeared during World War II.

== Trivia ==
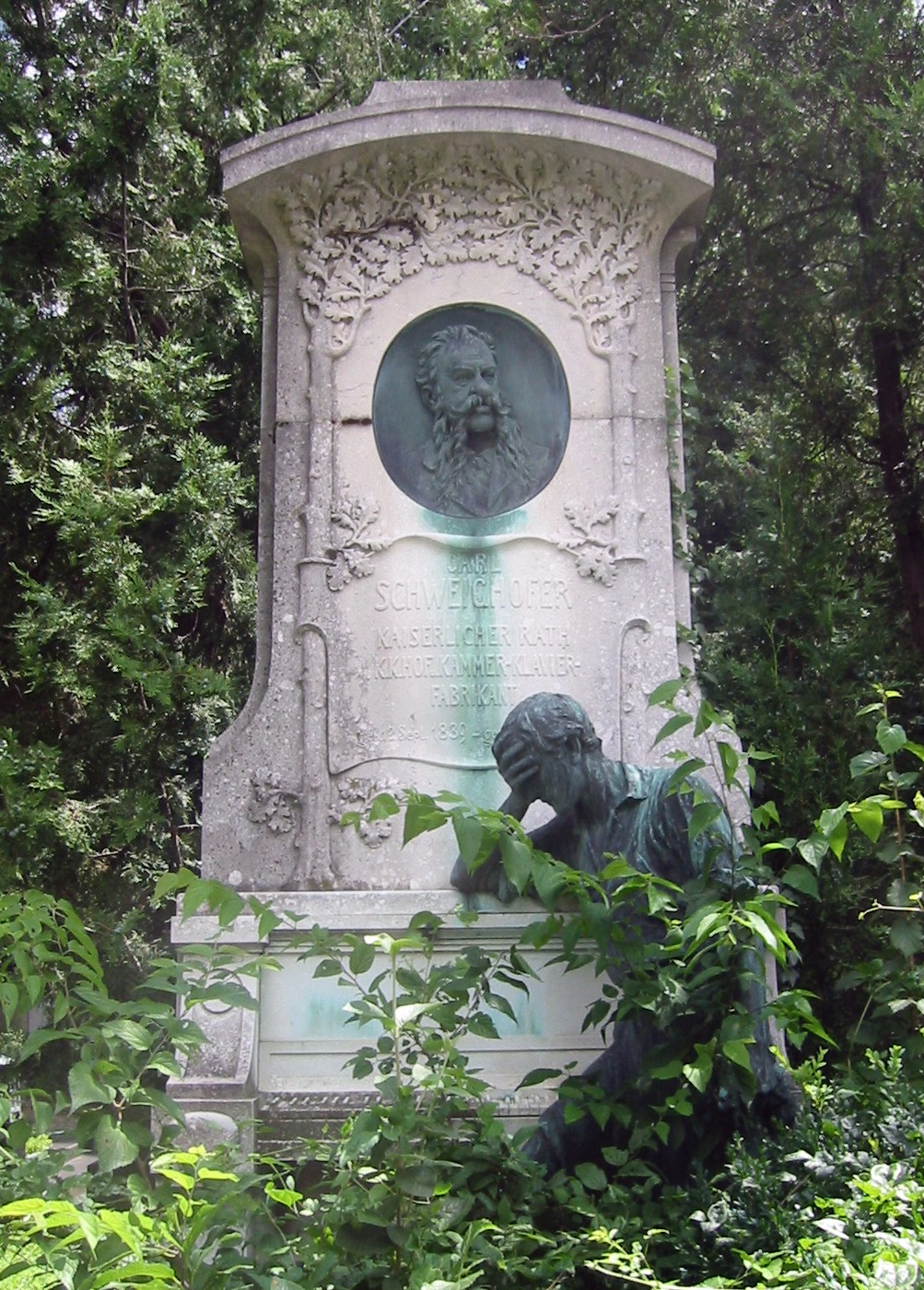
The grave of Carl Schweighofer in Vienna

The grave of Carl Schweighofer, located on the Zentralfriedhof in Vienna, is featured in the video and on the cover art for the 1981 Ultravox single "Vienna".
