= The Island Years =

The Island Years may refer to:

- The Island Years (Anthrax album)
- The Island Years (Ultravox album)
- The Island Years (John Cale album)
