= We Came to Dance =

Single by Ultravox

from the album Quartet
- B-side: "Overlook"; "Break Your Back"
- Released: May 27, 1983
- Recorded: 1982
- Studio: AIR (London, UK)
- Genre: Synth-pop; new wave
- Length: 4:05; 7:35 (extended version)
- Label: Chrysalis
- Songwriters: Warren Cann; Chris Cross; Billy Currie; Midge Ure
- Producer: George Martin

Ultravox singles chronology
"Visions in Blue" (1983)	"We Came to Dance" (1983)	"One Small Day" (1984)

"We Came to Dance" is a song by British new wave band Ultravox, released as the fourth and final single from their sixth studio album Quartet (1982), the third studio album recorded with singer Midge Ure, recorded at AIR Studios and released on Chrysalis Records on May 27, 1983. The single reached No. 18 on the UK charts on 18 June. This was the last of seven consecutive top-20 singles for the band.

== Track listing ==
=== 7" version ===
1. "We Came to Dance" – 4:05
2. "Overlook" – 4:04
- Alternate versions of the 7" single have "Break Your Back" on the B-side instead of "Overlook".

=== 12" version – UK release ===
1. "We Came to Dance" (extended version) – 7:35
2. "Overlook" – 4:04

=== 12" version – German release/UK promo ===
1. "We Came to Dance" – 7:57
2. "Reap the Wild Wind" (live version) – 3:53
3. "Break Your Back" – 3:25
