= All Stood Still =

Single by Ultravox

from the album Vienna
- B-side: "Alles Klar"; "Keep Torque-ing"
- Released: May 29, 1981
- Recorded: February 1980 at RAK Studios
- Genre: New wave
- Length: 3:40 (7" version); 5:05 (12" version)
- Label: Chrysalis Records
- Songwriters: Warren Cann; Chris Cross; Billy Currie; Midge Ure
- Producers: Ultravox; Conny Plank

Ultravox singles chronology
| "Vienna" (1981) | "All Stood Still" (1981) | "The Thin Wall" (1981) |

"All Stood Still" is Ultravox's fourth and final single from Vienna (1980), the band's first album with Midge Ure, released on Chrysalis Records on May 29, 1981.

The single debuted on the UK Singles Chart in June 1981 — two months after the chart run of the massive hit "Vienna" — and peaked at no. 8 in the same month, giving Ultravox their second of three Top Ten hits.

The B-sides are two original instrumentals. "Keep Torque-ing" is listed on the Rare, Vol. 1 compilation as "Keep Talking"; it is generally accepted that the latter was the correct name for the track. This track was a cassette recording during rehearsals.

== Track listing ==
=== 7" version ===
1. "All Stood Still" – 3:40
2. "Alles Klar" – 4:53

=== 12" version ===
1. "All Stood Still" (12" Version) – 5:05
2. "Alles Klar" – 4:53
3. "Keep Torque-ing" (cassette recording during rehearsals) – 6:21
