= The Best of Ultravox =

Greatest hits album by Ultravox
- Released: December 1, 2003
- Recorded: 1980–1986
- Genres: New wave; synth-pop
- Label: EMI Gold
- Producers: Ultravox; Conny Plank; George Martin

Ultravox chronology
The Island Years (1999)	The Best of Ultravox (2003)	Brilliant (2012)

Professional ratings
Review scores
Source	Rating
AllMusic	3.5/5 stars

The Best of Ultravox is a CD compilation by Ultravox, released by EMI Gold on December 1, 2003, and is essentially a repackaged reissue of the original Dancing with Tears in My Eyes compilation released in 1995. The songs on the disc are from the 1980-1987 era of the band, while Midge Ure was the singer and frontman.

== Track listing ==
1. "Sleepwalk"
2. "Waiting"
3. "Passing Strangers"
4. "Vienna"
5. "Passionate Reply"
6. "The Voice"
7. "Hymn"
8. "Monument"
9. "We Came to Dance"
10. "Dancing with Tears in My Eyes"
11. "Reap the Wild Wind"
12. "Love's Great Adventure"
13. "White China" (Live)
14. "All Fall Down"
15. "Dreams?"
16. "All in One Day"

== Personnel ==
- Midge Ure
- Billy Currie
- Chris Cross
- Warren Cann
- Mark Brzezicki
