= Passing Strangers =

Single by Ultravox

from the album Vienna
- B-side: "Face to Face (Live)"; "King's Lead Hat (Live)"
- Released: September 26, 1980
- Recorded: February 1980
- Studio: RAK, London
- Genre: Post-punk; electronic; new wave
- Length: 3:48
- Label: Chrysalis Records
- Songwriters: Warren Cann; Chris Cross; Billy Currie; Midge Ure
- Producers: Ultravox; Conny Plank

Ultravox singles chronology
"Sleepwalk" (1980)	"Passing Strangers" (1980)	"Vienna" (1981)

"Passing Strangers" is Ultravox's second single from Vienna, the band's first album with Midge Ure, released on Chrysalis Records on September 26, 1980.

A fast-paced guitar track recalling early John Foxx-era Ultravox, Passing Strangers ultimately failed to live up to the top 30 success of its predecessor "Sleepwalk". It stalled at #57 in the UK charts despite having a music video (directed by Russell Mulcahy and featuring Barbie Wilde and Tok from Tik & Tok) and release on 12" format alongside the regular 7", both of which "Sleepwalk" lacked. The video was shot in Beckton Gas Works, London.

The single contains two live b-sides; "Face To Face", an original Ultravox track that was never recorded in studio, and a live cover of the Brian Eno song "King's Lead Hat". "Face to Face" was taken from a show in St Albans City Hall. The complete show was released on the 40th anniversary Vienna box-set 2020.

== Track listing ==
=== 7" version ===
1. "Passing Strangers" – 3:48
2. "Face to Face (Live 16 Aug 80 at St Albans City Hall)" – 6:04

=== 12" version ===
1. "Passing Strangers" – 3:48
2. "Face to Face (Live 16 Aug 80 at St Albans City Hall)" – 6:04
3. "King's Lead Hat (Live 17 Aug 80 at Lyceum)" – 4:06
