= Aerodrums =

Virtual drum controllers

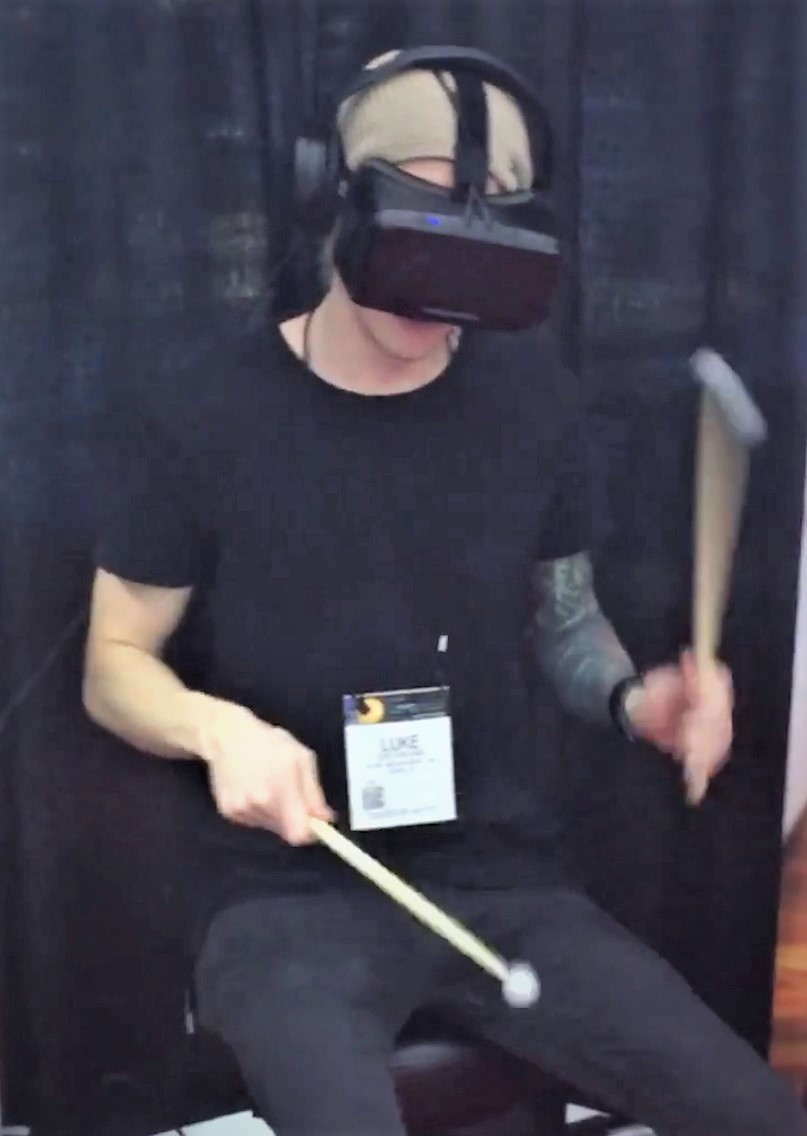
Aerodrums VR as demonstrated at the winter 2016 NAMM Show

Aerodrums is a set of virtual drum controllers that allows a drummer to play without requiring a physical drum kit. It has the advantage that it can be used in quiet settings such as in a family home or close to neighbours, as no residual noise is produced.

== Technology ==
Aerodrums operate via motion capture technology; a high speed camera captures reflections off the kit's sticks and foot pads and converts them into digital signals that can trigger the relevant drum sample. The system requires a PlayStation 3 eye camera and the software runs on Windows and MacOS. The whole kit can be stored in a backpack, making it transportable.

Because of the technology used, the equipment cannot be used outdoors in daylight, and works best in a dark room. Not all the sounds of a real drum can be played, because there are only samples. However, the controls are velocity sensitive, so there is some correct response to how hard the player hits a virtual drum.

== History ==
The controllers were created by video game developer Richard Lee and computer scientist Yann Morvan, who met while working on their PhD degrees at Trinity College Dublin. Lee has played drums since the age of nine. Morvan has said they both "didn't want Aerodrums to be a fad" and "wanted it to be a proper musical instrument".

Aerodrums were first demonstrated at the NAMM Show in 2014. A second appearance at the winter 2016 NAMM Show in Anaheim, California, featured a demonstration of being able to "see" a drumkit with Aerodrums via a virtual reality headset. Shortly afterwards, Lee and Morvan appeared on the British television show Dragon's Den, asking for a £75,000 investment in exchange for five percent of equity. Two investors teamed up to offer the pair the requested money, but with a forty-percent stake in the business, which they turned down. Morvan later said that the Dragons did not understand their business or the perceived market share, though he emphasised he was glad to have appeared on the show.

An enhanced system, Aerodrums 2, began development in 2023, and was funded by a Kickstarter campaign.

== Professional users ==
A. R. Rahman used Aerodrums on an American tour.
