= Sleepwalk (song) =

Single by Ultravox

from the album Vienna
- B-side: "Waiting"
- Released: June 20, 1980
- Recorded: February 1980
- Studio: RAK (London)
- Genre: Electronic
- Length: 3:10
- Label: Chrysalis
- Songwriters: Midge Ure; Chris Cross; Warren Cann; Billy Currie
- Producers: Conny Plank; Ultravox

Ultravox singles chronology
| "Quiet Men" (1978) | "Sleepwalk" (1980) | "Passing Strangers" (1980) |

"Sleepwalk" is a song by Ultravox, released on June 20, 1980 as the first single from their fourth album Vienna, and their first with Midge Ure as frontman. It was Ultravox's first UK top 30 chart hit, reaching number 29 in August 1980.

== Background ==
"Sleepwalk" was the first song the band recorded with Midge Ure February 1980 at RAK Studios, London. Rather than offering a demo tape of several songs to Chrysalis Records the reformed band opted to do a "finished" version of "Sleepwalk" with producer Conny Plank, a recording that clinched the band's record deal with Chrysalis Records. The original version was later remixed May 1980 at Conny's Studio in Cologne for inclusion on the band's album Vienna. There is no difference between the album version and the single version. The lyrics to the song were written by Warren Cann. It was released as a single in June 1980.

== Release ==
As well as the standard black vinyl, the 7" was released as a limited clear vinyl. The 12" release does not contain an extended version of the song, or a third/additional song, in fact it is simply a double A-sided promo single, with only "Sleepwalk" on each side.

The single's B-side, "Waiting" is a more solemn, bass-laden affair in comparison to the faster synth work of the A-side. It was recorded and mixed March 1980 at Matrix Studios, London. It now appears on the CD re-issue of Vienna as a bonus track, as well as various other Ultravox compilations.

== Track listing ==
1. "Sleepwalk" – 3:10
2. "Waiting" – 3:51
