= Lament (Ultravox song) =

Single by Ultravox

from the album Lament
- B-side: "Heart of the Country (Instrumental)"
- Released: June 29, 1984
- Recorded: Musicfest Studio, 1983
- Length: 4:27
- Label: Chrysalis Records
- Songwriters: Warren Cann; Chris Cross; Billy Currie; Midge Ure
- Producer: Ultravox

Ultravox singles chronology
"Dancing with Tears in My Eyes" (1984)	"Lament" (1984)	"Love's Great Adventure" (1984)

"Lament" is the third single and title track from Ultravox's seventh studio album, released on June 29, 1984.

The music video depicting the band members each meeting girls while on a trip to a remote Scottish island. The video was filmed in Elgol, Kilmarie, and Broadford Hall.

The single was less successful than the band's previous release, peaking at #22 in the United Kingdom and #47 in New Zealand.

== Track listing ==
=== 7" version ===
1. "Lament" – 4:17
2. "Heart Of The Country (Instrumental)" – 4:24

=== 12" version ===
1. "Lament (Extended Mix)" – 8:01
2. "Heart Of The Country (Instrumental)" – 3:48
3. "Lament" [single edit] – 4:17
