= Dancing with Tears in My Eyes =

1984 single by Ultravox

Single by Ultravox

from the album Lament
- B-side: "Building"
- Released: May 11, 1984
- Genre: Synth-pop; new wave
- Length: 4:10
- Label: Chrysalis
- Songwriters: Midge Ure; Chris Cross; Warren Cann; Billy Currie
- Producer: Ultravox

Ultravox singles chronology
"One Small Day" (1984)	"Dancing with Tears in My Eyes" (1984)	"Lament" (1984)

Music video
- "Dancing with Tears in My Eyes" on YouTube

"Dancing with Tears in My Eyes" a song by British new wave band Ultravox, released as the second single from their seventh studio album, Lament, on May 11, 1984. The single peaked at No. 3 on the UK singles chart and reached the top 10 in several European countries. The song also entered the Australian and Canadian top 75 but failed to chart in the US.

== Background ==
According to lead singer Midge Ure, the lyrics were inspired by the Nevil Shute book On the Beach, which is about a group of people in Australia awaiting nuclear radiation stemming from a nuclear war in the Northern Hemisphere. "They knew it was the end but they had time to think about how they wanted to choose their final moments", Ure stated, "And that’s what "Dancing With Tears in My Eyes" was about."

== Critical reception ==
Upon its release, Smash Hits reviewer Dave Rimmer wrote: "Once upon a time Ultravox had some bright ideas. Now they just seem to be re-running them rather badly. "Weeping for a memory/of a life gone by" goes part of the chorus, appropriately enough. It's also, tears in your eyes or not, damned difficult to dance to."

== Music video ==
The music video was directed by Chris Cross and Midge Ure. The video follows an interpretation of the lyrics that differs from the original inspiration found in the novel On the Beach. Instead of depicting the impact and aftermath of nuclear war, the premise of the video is a catastrophic meltdown at an unnamed civilian nuclear power station in the United Kingdom. Band members Chris Cross, Warren Cann and Billy Currie play workers and a police officer at the power station, with Midge Ure playing the narrator, a man seeking to return home to his family amidst scenes of mass panic and the breakdown of ordinary life.

The video thereafter depicts the actions of the narrator as described in the song; dancing with his wife (interpreted by Diana Weston), listening to music, drinking champagne and awaiting the end. The song concludes over the impact of a nuclear explosion viewed from inside the narrator's house, producing the windblown living room scene depicted on the cover of the single. The video ends over silent cinefilm home movies of the narrator and his family in happier times, before the film is burned away by overexposure.

== Live performances ==
"Dancing with Tears in My Eyes" was the second song that Ultravox performed during the Live Aid charity event at the old Wembley Stadium, on July 13, 1985, for which Ure also played the lead guitar.

== Track listings ==
The 7-inch single was released in three versions: with a standard picture sleeve, with a gate-fold booklet sleeve, and with a gate-fold booklet sleeve and a clear vinyl disc. All versions had the same catalogue number, "UV 1", and the same tracks. The 12-inch was released in two versions, with the same catalogue number "UVX 1": in a stickered gatefold sleeve containing a band poster and in a standard picture sleeve.

7-inch vinyl

- UK: Chrysalis – UV 1
- Germany: Chrysalis – 106 449
- US: Chrysalis – VS4 42781
- Canada: Chrysalis – CHS – 42781

Side one
No.	Title	Length
1.	"Dancing with Tears in My Eyes"	4:10

Side two
No.	Title	Length
1.	"Building"	3:11

12-inch vinyl (UK and Europe)

- UK: Chrysalis – UVX 1
- Germany: Chrysalis – 601 322

Side one
No.	Title	Length
1.	"Dancing with Tears in My Eyes" (Special Re-Mix)	10:00

Side two
No.	Title	Length
1.	"Dancing with Tears in My Eyes"	4:10
2.	"Building"	3:11

12-inch vinyl (North America)

- US: Chrysalis – 4V9 42783
- Canada: Chrysalis – CS 42783

Side one
No.	Title	Length
1.	"Dancing with Tears in My Eyes" (Extended)	7:44

Side two
No.	Title	Length
1.	"One Small Day" (Club Version)	7:48

== Charts ==
=== Weekly charts ===
Chart (1984)	Peak position
Australia (Kent Music Report)	58
Belgium (Ultratop 50 Flanders)	2
Canada Top Singles (RPM)	52
France (IFOP)	36
Ireland (IRMA)	8
Netherlands (Dutch Top 40)	6
Netherlands (Single Top 100)	12
New Zealand (Recorded Music NZ)	38
Switzerland (Schweizer Hitparade)	16
UK Singles (Official Charts)	3
US Bubbling Under the Hot 100 (Billboard)	8
West Germany (GfK)	7

=== Year-end charts ===
Chart (1984)	Rank
Belgium (Ultratop 50 Flanders)	68
Netherlands (Dutch Top 40)	49
Netherlands (Single Top 100)	90
UK Singles (Gallup)	71
West Germany (Media Control)	73

== Cover versions ==
A 2004 cover of the song by German Eurodance act Novaspace reached No. 11 in Germany and No. 6 in Austria.
