= One Small Day =

Single by Ultravox

from the album Lament
- B-side: "Easterly"
- Released: February 3, 1984
- Recorded: Musicfest Studio, 1983
- Genre: Pop rock; new wave
- Length: 4:27; 7:48 (Special re-mix); 8:31 (Special re-mix extra)
- Label: Chrysalis
- Songwriters: Warren Cann; Chris Cross; Billy Currie; Midge Ure
- Producer: Ultravox

Ultravox singles chronology
"We Came to Dance" (1983)	"One Small Day" (1984)	"Dancing with Tears in My Eyes" (1984)

"One Small Day" is the first single from Ultravox's seventh studio album, Lament, released on February 3, 1984. It peaked at #27 in the UK Singles Chart.

The song is unusual for Ultravox in that it is mainly guitar rather than synth driven.

The 'performance' part of the music video was shot in very cold conditions over the weekend of Saturday, 14 - Sunday, January 15, 1984, primarily at the Callanish III standing stones site at Callanish on the Isle of Lewis in the Outer Hebrides (Western Isles) of Scotland. Other non-performance parts were filmed at the main Callanish I standing stones site and edited into the video and featured individual band members reflected in vertically placed triangular-shaped mirrors.

The song was also performed at the 1985 Live Aid concert.

== Track listing ==
=== 7" version ===
1. "One Small Day" – 4:27
2. "Easterly" – 3:48

=== 12" version ===
1. "One Small Day (Special Re-Mix)" – 7:48
2. "Easterly" – 3:48
3. "One Small Day" – 4:27
- Limited editions of the 12" single include the "Special Remix Extra" of One Small Day in place of the "Special Re-Mix", which is 8:31 long.

There was a third remix entitled "The Final Mix" which was issued as part of a limited edition bonus disc with "The Collection" entitled "The 12" Collection". the "Final Mix" of "One Small Day" runs for 7:36. A version of the "Final Mix" was included on the definitive reissue of "Lament". This version has a longer fade out and runs to 7:44. A fourth version, named Club Version running 7:48, was released as the B-side of the US 12" Single for Dancing with Tears in My Eyes.
