= Lament (Ultravox album) =

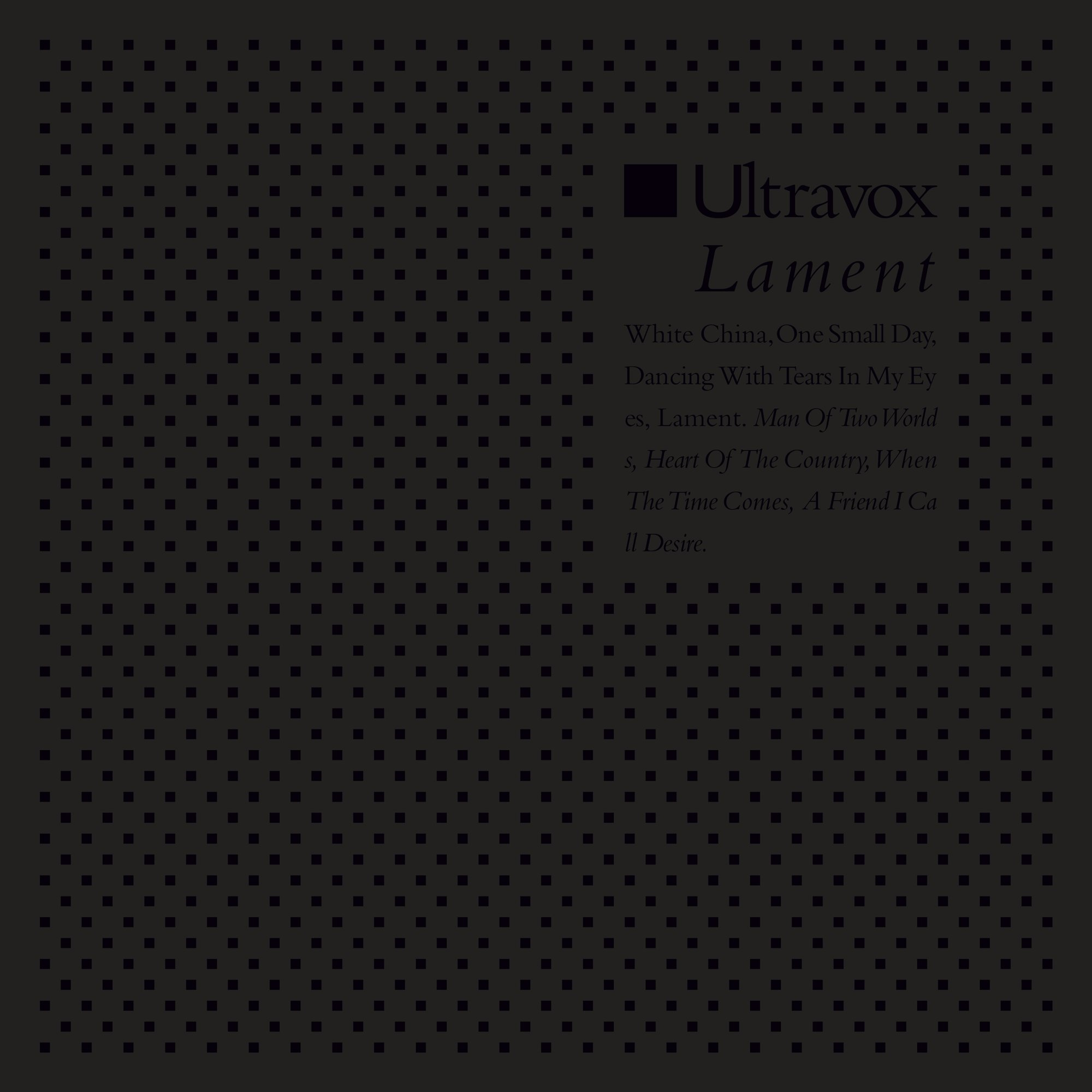

Studio album by Ultravox
- Released: April 6, 1984
- Recorded: 1983–1984
- Studio: Musicfest (London)
- Genres: Synth-pop; new wave; new romantic
- Length: 37:29 (LP); 62:11 (CD)
- Label: Chrysalis
- Producer: Ultravox

Ultravox chronology
| Monument the Soundtrack (1983) | Lament (1984) | The Collection (1984) |

Singles from Lament
- 1. "One Small Day" Released: February 3, 1984; 2. "Dancing with Tears in My Eyes" Released: May 11, 1984; 3. "Lament" Released: June 29, 1984; 4. "Heart of the Country (Germany release)" Released: September 1984

Alternative cover
- Cover art used for later releases

Professional ratings
Review scores
| Source | Rating |
|---|---|
| AllMusic | 4/5 stars |
| Rolling Stone | 3/5 stars |

Lament is the seventh studio album by British new wave band Ultravox, released on April 6, 1984 by Chrysalis Records. It was the last album featuring original drummer Warren Cann until the band's reunion album Brilliant in 2012. The album peaked at number eight on the UK Albums Chart and was certified gold by the British Phonographic Industry (BPI) on June 8, 1984 for shipments of 100,000 copies. It also reached number 25 in Germany and number 115 in the United States.

== Background ==
Ultravox produced Lament themselves, a logical step considering the experience that they had gained working with two very different producers, Conny Plank and George Martin. Midge Ure and Billy Currie had at this time built their own home studios, Ure's Musicfest Studio located in Chiswick and Currie's Hot Food Studio in his basement in Notting Hill Gate.

The album's inner sleeve on LP releases features a photograph of Callanish Stones, a Neolithic stone arrangement on Lewis in Scotland. On later releases of the album, this photograph appears on the front cover in place of the original tracklist, which is instead displayed on the formerly-blank back cover.

== Tour ==
The tour was called "Set Movements Tour", including 5 nights at Hammersmith Odeon 6 to 10 June 1984, and was supported by the band Messengers.

== Versions ==
The album's initial release on CD was two weeks later (released 20 April 1984) and featured a different track listing from the initial LP release as the songs were interspersed with remixes. When the album was next re-released on CD on 13 September 1999, it featured the original track listing with seven bonus tracks consisting of various B-sides and remixes from the Lament period added to the end of the album.

The album was once again re-released in 2009 as a double CD set. The first disc consisted of the original album remastered. The second disc contained remixes, B-sides and previously unreleased "work in progress" versions of songs. In 2024, a deluxe seven CD set, which also contains an audio DVD featuring surround sound and stereo versions of the Lament/B-sides Steven Wilson Mixes Original 1984 Mixes plus 24/96 LPCM Stereo Mix of the original 1984 mixes of Lament/B-sides, was released.

== Track listing ==
=== LP track listing ===
All tracks are written by Warren Cann, Chris Cross, Billy Currie & Midge Ure.

Side A
| No. | Title | Length |
|---|---|---|
| 1. | "White China" | 3:50 |
| 2. | "One Small Day" | 4:30 |
| 3. | "Dancing with Tears in My Eyes" | 4:39 |
| 4. | "Lament" | 4:40 |

Side B
| No. | Title | Length |
|---|---|---|
| 5. | "Man of Two Worlds" (featuring Gaelic vocals by Mae McKenna) | 4.27 |
| 6. | "Heart of the Country" | 5:05 |
| 7. | "When the Time Comes" | 4:56 |
| 8. | "A Friend I Call Desire" | 5:08 |
| Total length: | | 37:29 |

=== Cassette ===
Cassette, Side A
| No. | Title | Length |
|---|---|---|
| 1. | "White China" | 3:50 |
| 2. | "One Small Day" | 4:30 |
| 3. | "Dancing with Tears in My Eyes" | 4:39 |
| 4. | "Lament" | 4:40 |
| 5. | "One Small Day" (Extended Mix (from limited edition UK 12 inch single aka [Special Remix Extra]) | 8:31 |

Side B
| No. | Title | Length |
|---|---|---|
| 6. | "Man of Two Worlds" (featuring Gaelic vocals by Mae McKenna) | 4.27 |
| 7. | "Heart of the Country" | 5:05 |
| 8. | "When the Time Comes" | 4:56 |
| 9. | "A Friend I Call Desire" | 5:08 |
| 10. | "Lament" (Extended Mix) | 8:01 |
| Total length: | | 54:01 |

=== CD ===
| No. | Title | Length |
|---|---|---|
| 1. | "White China" | 3:50 |
| 2. | "One Small Day" | 4:30 |
| 3. | "Dancing with Tears in My Eyes" | 4:39 |
| 4. | "Lament" | 4:40 |
| 5. | "White China" (Special Mix) | 8:23 |
| 6. | "One Small Day" (Extended Mix (from limited edition UK 12 inch single aka [Special Remix Extra]) | 8:31 |
| 7. | "Man of Two Worlds" (featuring Gaelic vocals by Mae McKenna) | 4.27 |
| 8. | "Heart of the Country" | 5:05 |
| 9. | "When the Time Comes" | 4:56 |
| 10. | "A Friend I Call Desire" | 5:08 |
| 11. | "Lament" (Extended Mix) | 8:01 |
| Total length: | | 62:11 |

=== 1999 UK re-release ===
| No. | Title | Length |
|---|---|---|
| 1. | "White China" | 3:52 |
| 2. | "One Small Day" | 4:33 |
| 3. | "Dancing with Tears in My Eyes" | 4:40 |
| 4. | "Lament" | 4:42 |
| 5. | "Man of Two Worlds" (featuring Gaelic vocals by Mae McKenna) | 4.28 |
| 6. | "Heart of the Country" | 5:05 |
| 7. | "When the Time Comes" | 4:58 |
| 8. | "A Friend I Call Desire" | 5:13 |
| 9. | "Easterly" | 3:49 |
| 10. | "Building" | 3:14 |
| 11. | "Heart of the Country" (Instrumental) | 4:25 |
| 12. | "Man of Two Worlds" (Instrumental) | 4:33 |
| 13. | "White China" (Special Mix) | 8:23 |
| 14. | "One Small Day" (Extended Mix (from limited edition UK 12 inch single aka [Special Remix Extra]) | 8:31 |
| 15. | "Lament" (Extended Mix) | 8:01 |
| Total length: | | 78:12 |

=== 2009 Remastered Definitive Edition ===
Disc One
| No. | Title | Length |
|---|---|---|
| 1. | "White China" | 3:53 |
| 2. | "One Small Day" | 4:33 |
| 3. | "Dancing with Tears in My Eyes" | 4:40 |
| 4. | "Lament" | 4:41 |
| 5. | "Man of Two Worlds" (featuring Gaelic vocals by Mae McKenna) | 4.28 |
| 6. | "Heart of the Country" | 5:06 |
| 7. | "When the Time Comes" | 4:57 |
| 8. | "A Friend I Call Desire" | 5:11 |

Disc two
| No. | Title | Length |
|---|---|---|
| 1. | "One Small Day" (Special 12″ Remix) | 7:51 |
| 2. | "Easterly" (B-side of "One Small Day") | 3:48 |
| 3. | "Lament" (Extended 12″ version) | 8:02 |
| 4. | "One Small Day" (Limited Edition Remix) | 8:31 |
| 5. | "Dancing with Tears in My Eyes" (Special 12″ Remix) | 10:02 |
| 6. | "Building" (B-side of "Dancing with Tears in My Eyes") | 3:11 |
| 7. | "White China" (Special Mix, original CD version) | 8:23 |
| 8. | "Heart of the Country" (Instrumental) (B-side of "Lament") | 4:24 |
| 9. | "One Small Day" (Final Mix) | 7:45 |
| 10. | "A Friend I Call Desire" (Work in Progress Mix) | 5:39 |
| 11. | "Lament" (Work in Progress Mix) | 4:53 |
| Total length: | | 1:59:58 |

=== 2024 Record Store Day Steven Wilson Extended Re-Mixes ===
Prior to the issue of a deluxe special edition box set of Lament in 2024, April's Record Store Day saw the release of a limited edition 12" featuring four newly created extended versions of album tracks, mixed by Steven Wilson. Two of these were to feature on the box set, and two were exclusive to the special vinyl release.

Side One
| No. | Title | Length |
|---|---|---|
| 1. | "White China" | 7:51 |
| 2. | "Man of Two Worlds" | 8:55 |

Side Two
| No. | Title | Length |
|---|---|---|
| 3. | "When The Time Comes" | 7.20 |
| 4. | "A Friend I Call Desire" | 8:11 |
| Total length: | | 32:17 |

=== 2024 Super Deluxe Edition ===
This release is available on vinyl and CD box set.

Disc One: 2024 Remaster
| No. | Title | Length |
|---|---|---|
| 1. | "White China" | 3:53 |
| 2. | "One Small Day" | 4:33 |
| 3. | "Dancing with Tears in My Eyes" | 4:40 |
| 4. | "Lament" | 4:41 |
| 5. | "Man of Two Worlds" (featuring Gaelic vocals by Mae McKenna) | 4.28 |
| 6. | "Heart of the Country" | 5:06 |
| 7. | "When the Time Comes" | 4:57 |
| 8. | "A Friend I Call Desire" | 5:11 |

Disc Two: Steven Wilson Stereo Mix
| No. | Title | Length |
|---|---|---|
| 1. | "White China" | 3:53 |
| 2. | "One Small Day" | 4:33 |
| 3. | "Dancing with Tears in My Eyes" | 4:40 |
| 4. | "Lament" | 4:41 |
| 5. | "Man of Two Worlds" (featuring Gaelic vocals by Mae McKenna) | 4.28 |
| 6. | "Heart of the Country" | 5:06 |
| 7. | "When the Time Comes" | 4:57 |
| 8. | "A Friend I Call Desire" | 5:11 |
| 9. | "Easterly" | 5:06 |
| 10. | "Building" | 3:14 |
| 11. | "Love's Great Adventure" | 3:03 |

Disc Three: Extended Re-Mix Album
| No. | Title | Length |
|---|---|---|
| 1. | "White China" (Extended Re-Mix) | 9.02 |
| 2. | "One Small Day" (Extended Re-Mix) | 8.46 |
| 3. | "Dancing with Tears in My Eyes" (Blank & Jones So8Os Reconstruction) | 6.00 |
| 4. | "Lament" (Moby Remix) | 4.26 |
| 5. | "Man of Two Worlds" (Extended Mix) | 8.05 |
| 6. | "Heart of the Country" (Extended Re-Mix) | 8.14 |
| 7. | "When the Time Comes" (Steven Wilson 12" Mix) | 7.20 |
| 8. | "A Friend I Call Desire" (Steven Wilson 12" Mix) | 8:11 |

Disc Four: Singles, B-Sides & Rarities
| No. | Title | Length |
|---|---|---|
| 1. | "One Small Day" (U.S. Single Edit) | 4:39 |
| 2. | "Easterly" (2024 Remaster) | 3:48 |
| 3. | "Dancing with Tears in My Eyes" (Single Version) | 4:10 |
| 4. | "Building" (2024 Remaster) | 3:11 |
| 5. | "One Small Day" (U.S. Club Version) | 7:44 |
| 6. | "Lament" (Single Version) | 4:18 |
| 7. | "Heart of the Country" (Instrumental) | 4:26 |
| 8. | "Love's Great Adventure" (2024 Remaster) | 3:06 |
| 9. | "White China" (Live at Hammersmith Odeon, June 1984) | 3:46 |
| 10. | "Man of Two Worlds" (Instrumental) | 4:31 |
| 11. | "White China" (Rough Mix Sept '83) | 3:51 |
| 12. | "Man of Two Worlds" (Monitor Mix Aug '83) | 4:45 |
| 13. | "Lament" (Backing Track Sept '83) | 5:18 |
| 14. | "Dancing with Tears in My Eyes" (Piano Version) | 3:20 |
| 15. | "Love's Great Adventure" (Work in Progress Mix) | 3:09 |
| 16. | "Threads" (Version 1) | 1:04 |
| 17. | "Threads" (Version 2: "Love's Great Adventure") | 1:11 |
| 18. | "Rivets" | 0:57 |

Disc Five: The 1984 Extended Re-Mixes
| No. | Title | Length |
|---|---|---|
| 1. | "One Small Day" (Special Re-Mix) | 7:48 |
| 2. | "One Small Day" (Special Re-Mix Extra) | 8:31 |
| 3. | "White China" (Special Re-Mix) | 8:23 |
| 4. | "Dancing with Tears in My Eyes" (Special Re-Mix) | 10:00 |
| 5. | "Dancing with Tears in My Eyes" (U.S. Extended Re-Mix) | 7:43 |
| 6. | "Lament" (Extended Version) | 8:03 |
| 7. | "Heart of the Country" (Special Unedited Re-Mix) | 11:59 |
| 8. | "Love's Great Adventure" (Extended Version) | 5:42 |
| 9. | "One Small Day" (Final Mix) | 7:36 |

Disc Six: Live at London Hammersmith Odeon, 7th June 1984, Part one
| No. | Title | Length |
|---|---|---|
| 1. | "Man of Two Worlds" | 4:10 |
| 2. | "Passing Strangers" | 5:10 |
| 3. | "We Stand Alone" | 6:08 |
| 4. | "New Europeans" | 4:18 |
| 5. | "I Remember (Death in the Afternoon)" | 5:07 |
| 6. | "Visions in Blue" | 4:32 |
| 7. | "Heart of the Country" | 4:52 |
| 8. | "Western Promise" | 6:34 |
| 9. | "Vienna" | 4:59 |

Disc Seven: Live at London Hammersmith Odeon, 7th June 1984, Part two
| No. | Title | Length |
|---|---|---|
| 1. | "Reap the Wild Wind" | 3:47 |
| 2. | "We Came to Dance" | 2:35 |
| 3. | "White China" | 3:45 |
| 4. | "One Small Day" | 4:31 |
| 5. | "Hymn" | 4:48 |
| 6. | "The Voice" | 7:08 |
| 7. | "Lament" | 4:46 |
| 8. | "Dancing with Tears in My Eyes" | 5:06 |
| 9. | "All Stood Still" | 4:48 |

DVD
| No. | Title | Length |
|---|---|---|
| 1. | "White China" | 3:53 |
| 2. | "One Small Day" | 4:33 |
| 3. | "Dancing with Tears in My Eyes" | 4:40 |
| 4. | "Lament" | 4:41 |
| 5. | "Man of Two Worlds" (featuring Gaelic vocals by Mae McKenna) | 4.28 |
| 6. | "Heart of the Country" | 5:06 |
| 7. | "When the Time Comes" | 4:57 |
| 8. | "A Friend I Call Desire" | 5:11 |
| 9. | "Easterly" | 5:06 |
| 10. | "Building" | 3:11 |
| 11. | "Love's Great Adventure" | 3:06 |
| 12. | "White China" (Steven Wilson Stereo Mix) | 3:53 |
| 13. | "One Small Day" (Steven Wilson Stereo Mix) | 4:30 |
| 14. | "Dancing with Tears in My Eyes" (Steven Wilson Stereo Mix) | 4:40 |
| 15. | "Lament" (Steven Wilson Stereo Mix) | 4:41 |
| 16. | "Man of Two Worlds" (Steven Wilson Stereo Mix) | 4:32 |
| 17. | "Heart of the Country" (Steven Wilson Stereo Mix) | 5:06 |
| 18. | "When the Time Comes" (Steven Wilson Stereo Mix) | 4:58 |
| 19. | "A Friend I Call Desire" (Steven Wilson Stereo Mix) | 5:13 |
| 20. | "Easterly" (Steven Wilson Stereo Mix) | 3:52 |
| 21. | "Building" (Steven Wilson Stereo Mix) | 3:14 |
| 22. | "Love's Great Adventure" (Steven Wilson Stereo Mix) | 3:09 |
| 23. | "White China" (Original 1984 Mix) | 3:51 |
| 24. | "One Small Day" (Original 1984 Mix) | 4:33 |
| 25. | "Dancing with Tears in My Eyes" (Original 1984 Mix) | 4:44 |
| 26. | "Lament" (Original 1984 Mix) | 4:41 |
| 27. | "Man of Two Worlds" (Original 1984 Mix) | 4:29 |
| 28. | "Heart of the Country" (Original 1984 Mix) | 5:08 |
| 29. | "When the Time Comes" (Original 1984 Mix) | 4:59 |
| 30. | "A Friend I Call Desire" (Original 1984 Mix) | 5:13 |
| 31. | "One Small Day" (U.S. Single Promo Edit) | 4:39 |
| 32. | "Easterly" | 3:48 |
| 33. | "Dancing with Tears in My Eyes" (Single Version) | 4:10 |
| 34. | "Building" | 3:11 |
| 35. | "Lament" (Single Version) | 4:18 |
| 36. | "Heart of the Country" (Instrumental) | 4:26 |
| 37. | "Love's Great Adventure" | 3:06 |
| 38. | "White China" (Live At Hammersmith Odeon, June 1984) | 3:46 |
| 39. | "Man Of Two Worlds" (Instrumental) | 4:31 |

== Personnel ==
Ultravox

- Warren Cann – drums, electronic percussion, backing vocals
- Chris Cross – bass, synthesizer, backing vocals
- Billy Currie – keyboards, violin
- Midge Ure – guitar, lead vocals

Additional musicians

- Gaelic vocals on "Man of Two Worlds" by Mae McKenna
- String quartet on "Heart of the Country" by Amanda Woods, Jacky Woods, Margaret Roseberry, Robert Woollard
- Backing vocals on "A Friend I Call Desire" by Shirley Roden and Debi Doss

== Charts ==
=== Weekly charts ===
1984 weekly chart performance for Lament
| Chart (1984) | Peak position |
|---|---|
| Australian Albums (Kent Music Report) | 41 |
| Canada Top Albums/CDs (RPM) | 58 |
| Dutch Albums (Album Top 100) | 24 |
| European Albums (Eurotipsheet) | 16 |
| German Albums (Offizielle Top 100) | 25 |
| Icelandic Albums (Tónlist) | 8 |
| New Zealand Albums (RMNZ) | 7 |
| Norwegian Albums (VG-lista) | 10 |
| Swedish Albums (Sverigetopplistan) | 8 |
| UK Albums (Official Charts) | 8 |
| US Billboard 200 | 115 |

2024 weekly chart performance for Lament
| Chart (2024) | Peak position |
|---|---|
| Belgian Albums (Ultratop Flanders) | 119 |
| German Albums (Offizielle Top 100) | 18 |

=== Year-end charts ===
Year-end chart performance for Lament
| Chart (1984) | Position |
|---|---|
| UK Albums (Gallup) | 71 |

== Certifications ==
Certifications for Lament
| Region | Certification | Certified units/sales |
|---|---|---|
| United Kingdom (BPI) | Gold | 100,000^{^} |
^{^} Shipments figures based on certification alone.
