= Quartet (Ultravox album) =

Studio album by Ultravox
- Released: October 15, 1982
- Recorded: 1982
- Studios: AIR, London; AIR, Montserrat
- Genres: New wave; synth-pop; art pop; new romantic
- Length: 40:54
- Label: Chrysalis
- Producer: George Martin

Ultravox chronology
Rage in Eden (1981)	Quartet (1982)	Monument the Soundtrack (1983)

Singles from Quartet
- 1. "Reap the Wild Wind" Released: September 17, 1982; 2. "Hymn" Released: November 19, 1982; 3. "Visions in Blue" Released: March 11, 1983; 4. "We Came to Dance" Released: May 27, 1983

Professional ratings
Review scores
Source	Rating
AllMusic	3/5 stars
Robert Christgau	C
Rolling Stone	2/5 stars
Smash Hits	8/10 stars

Quartet is the sixth studio album by the British new wave band Ultravox. The album peaked at number six on the UK Albums Chart and was certified Gold by the BPI in December 1982 for 100,000 copies sold. It also peaked at number 13 in Germany, and at number 61 in the United States.

== Background ==
After three albums produced by Conny Plank, Ultravox dropped their longtime producer, feeling they needed the excitement to work with another producer on their next. They asked George Martin, most notable for his work with The Beatles, to produce the album. Martin chose to take the job as producer because his daughter was an Ultravox fan. He said in 1983 in the Monument video: "They are without a doubt the most musical group I have come across in recent years." The album was recorded at Martin's AIR Studios in London from June to July 1982, then in AIR Studios in Montserrat from July to August 1982.

The band had already decided that they didn't want to write the songs in the studio like they did with their previous album Rage in Eden so they developed a pattern whereby they went into a rehearsal studio for three weeks and put down ideas. Then they took a week off and listened to the cassettes and pulled out the best bits and thought about lyrics. They did that for three months and found that they had no shortage of ideas, although fitting them together was often a problem as they kept having to cut out bits they liked. At the end of that time there were eight complete songs. One of the basic philosophies of the band has been that constant change and development was important to their music, which prompted them to start thinking about a new producer. When George Martin's name was suggested, they all agreed that it was such an unusual choice that he was the man for the job.

The choice of George Martin to produce the album was criticised by some as overly safe and conservative, and the band members later expressed similar feelings about the collaboration: Midge Ure said that Martin was a pleasure to work with but that Quartet was perhaps too polished, cutting out all the rough edges from the band's sound. Warren Cann expressed similar mixed feelings about the experience of working with Martin. Billy Currie acknowledged that Martin had some influence on their arrangements, but concurred that there was a safeness to it all. George's son, Giles, noted in 2018 that George's hearing loss (which was then "an industry secret") impeded his ability to contribute to the album, citing an anecdote where he asked his father about how production was progressing, only for the elder Martin to answer "Two boiled eggs," having misheard Giles' remark as an inquiry into what he had eaten for lunch.

The cover artwork was designed by Peter Saville.

The Monument Tour became the largest tour Ultravox undertook. The tour began in November 1982 and ended in May 1983 with shows in Europe, United States, Canada and Japan. The support band were Messengers who also sang backing vocals with Ultravox.

== Release ==
The album was released on October 15, 1982. Four singles, "Reap the Wild Wind", "Hymn", "Visions in Blue" and "We Came to Dance", were released from the album, all of which reached the UK Top 20. The album was also released as a marble picture disc LP, a cassette and, in 1983, a CD. The band promoted the album with their "Monument Tour" in late 1982, one of the shows from which was recorded and released as an album and video in 1983.

== Critical reception ==
Quartet has received mixed reviews. Upon its 1982 release Smash Hits gave it a positive 8/10 rating, while Rolling Stone reviewer Kurt Loder described the bands decision to work with George Martin as "something of a catastrophe". Giving it a 2/5 rating Loder concluded: "In Martin's regulation AOR production, there's little depth or drama; everything seems to sit on the surface. Quartet isn't a bad record, but coming from the band that gave us Vienna, it's inevitably a disappointment."

Retrospectively, Trouser Press described the album as "clear but unsatisfying", while the 2023 box set was given a 4 out of 5 star rating in Record Collector: "For their third Midge Ure album, released in 1982, Ultravox replaced producer Conny Plank with George Martin for a slicker pop version of their futurist grandeur. The results delivered as desired, furnishing them with hits in the elegantly catchy "Reap The Wild Wind", irresistibly lofty "Hymn" and glacial "We Came To Dance". Ure flexes his guitar-god tendencies on "Mine For Life" and "When The Scream Subsides", while "Visions In Blue" maxes the moody opulence marvellously."

== Remasters ==
Quartet was remastered and re-released on CD by EMI in 1998 with the B-sides to each of the album's singles as bonus tracks. Another remastered version, a 2-disc set with previously unreleased material, was released in February 2009.

A 7-disc box set was released in July 2023, consisting of a 1982 analog master, a new Steven Wilson remix, plus discs containing rehearsals, b-sides and a Hammersmith Odeon show from 1982. A surround mix was included on DVD. The instrumental mix was not included, but it was mentioned online that that usually follows on a separate CD.

== Track listing ==
All songs written by Warren Cann, Chris Cross, Billy Currie and Midge Ure.

=== Original release (CDL 1394) ===
Side A

1. "Reap the Wild Wind" – 3:49
2. "Serenade" – 5:05
3. "Mine for Life" – 4:44
4. "Hymn" – 5:46

Side B

1. "Visions in Blue" – 4:38
2. "When the Scream Subsides" – 4:17
3. "We Came to Dance" – 4:14
4. "Cut and Run" – 4:18
5. "The Song" (We Go) – 3:56

=== 1998 CD re-release (7243 4 96823 2 0) ===
1. "Reap the Wild Wind" – 3:49
2. "Serenade" – 5:05
3. "Mine for Life" – 4:44
4. "Hymn" – 5:46
5. "Visions in Blue" – 4:38
6. "When the Scream Subsides" – 4:17
7. "We Came to Dance" – 4:14
8. "Cut and Run" – 4:18
9. "The Song" (We Go) – 3:56
10. "Hosanna (In Excelsis Deo)" – 4:21 (bonus track)
11. "Monument" – 3:16 (bonus track)
12. "Break Your Back" – 3:27 (bonus track)
13. "Overlook" – 4:04 (bonus track)

=== 2009 Remastered Definitive Edition (B001OD6HFO) ===
Disc 1

1. "Reap the Wild Wind" – 3:49
2. "Serenade" – 5:05
3. "Mine for Life" – 4:46
4. "Hymn" – 5:49
5. "Visions in Blue" – 4:40
6. "When the Scream Subsides" – 4:16
7. "We Came to Dance" – 4:13
8. "Cut and Run" – 4:17
9. "The Song (We Go)" – 3:59

Disc 2

1. "Reap the Wild Wind" (Extended 12" Version) – 4:45
2. "Hosanna (In Excelsis Deo)" (B-side of Reap the Wild Wind) – 4:21
3. "Monument" (B-side of Hymn) – 3:14
4. "The Thin Wall (Live)" (B-side of Hymn 12") – 5:54
5. "Break Your Back" (B-side of Visions in Blue) – 3:25
6. "Reap the Wild Wind" (Live) – 4:04
7. "We Came to Dance" (Extended 12" Version) – 7:35
8. "Overlook" (B-side of We Came to Dance) – 4:03
9. "The Voice" (Fanclub Flexi-disc Version) (Live) – 4:36
10. "Serenade" (Special Remix) – 6:03
11. "New Europeans" (Live) – 4:18
12. "We Stand Alone" (Live) – 5:35
13. "I Remember (Death in the Afternoon)" (Live) – 6:25
- Track 4 recorded live at Hammersmith Odeon, 17 October 1981.
- Tracks 6, 9, 11-13 recorded live at Hammersmith Odeon, 5 December 1982.

== Personnel ==
Ultravox

- Warren Cann – drums, backing vocals (co-lead vocals in "We Came to Dance")
- Chris Cross – bass, synthesizer, backing vocals
- Billy Currie – keyboards, violin
- Midge Ure – guitar, lead vocals, synthesizers

Additional personnel

- George Martin – production
- Geoff Emerick – engineering
- Mark Freegard – recording and mixing of "Break Your Back" at Wessex Studios
- Jon Jacobs – assistance
- Peter Saville – cover design

== Charts ==
Chart (1982–83)	Peak position
Australian Albums (Kent Music Report)	35
German Albums (Offizielle Top 100)	13
Japanese Albums (Oricon)	75
New Zealand Albums (RMNZ)	38
Norwegian Albums (VG-lista)	19
Swedish Albums (Sverigetopplistan)	13
UK Albums (Official Charts)	6
US Billboard 200	61

Chart (2023)	Peak position
Belgian Albums (Ultratop Flanders)	193
Scottish Albums (Official Charts)	9
UK Albums (Official Charts)	58
UK Independent Albums (Official Charts)	5

== Certifications ==
Region	Certification	Certified units/sales
United Kingdom (BPI)	Gold	100,000^{^}
^{^} Shipments figures based on certification alone.
