= Hymn (Ultravox song) =

Single by Ultravox

from the album Quartet
- B-side: "Monument"; "The Thin Wall (Live)"
- Released: November 19, 1982
- Recorded: 1982
- Studio: AIR, London
- Genre: Synth-pop; post-punk; new wave
- Length: 4:24 (single edit); 5:46 (album version)
- Label: Chrysalis Records
- Songwriters: Warren Cann; Chris Cross; Billy Currie; Midge Ure
- Producer: George Martin

Ultravox singles chronology
"Reap the Wild Wind" (1982)	"Hymn" (1982)	"Visions in Blue" (1983)

"Hymn" is a song from Ultravox's sixth studio album Quartet. Released as the album's second single on 19 November 1982, it reached #11 on the UK Singles Chart and the Top 10 in Germany and Switzerland.

== History ==
The song was written by Warren Cann, Chris Cross, Billy Currie and Midge Ure and produced by George Martin. The melody of the song was heavily inspired by The Zones' song "Mourning Star" (1977). A portion of the song was recycled from one of first tunes the band wrote together with Ure three years prior.

Multiple synthesizers are listed in the creation of the track, including the PPG Wave, Minimoog, ARP Odyssey, E-mu Emulator, and Yamaha CS-80. Lyrically, the song describes a time of corruption, in which "all that's good will fall from grace" and "Different words [...] have other meaning"; the protagonist expresses his worldly ambitions for "power and glory" in phrases from Bible ("the storybook"), especially The Lord's Prayer.

In line with this theme, the music video, directed by Ure and Cross, depicts a diabolical figure (played by Oliver Tobias) seducing men struggling in their fields (an actor, a politician, a musician and an office assistant, played by the four Ultravox members). After signing a contract, they all achieve success, though - as hinted at by the final scenes - at a cost.

The cover art depicts certain symbols of Freemasonry, most notably the compass and the square.

== Track listing ==
=== 7" version ===
1. "Hymn" [single edit] – 4:24
2. "Monument" – 3:16

=== 12" version ===
1. "Hymn" – 5:46
2. "Monument" – 3:16
3. "The Thin Wall (live 17 Oct 81 at Hammersmith Odeon)" – 5:54

== Charts ==
Chart (1982–1983)	Position
Ireland (IRMA)	15
Germany (GfK)	9
Switzerland (Schweizer Hitparade)	6
UK Singles (Official Charts)	11
