= Vienna (album) =

Studio album by Ultravox
- Released: July 11, 1980
- Recorded: 1980
- Studio: RAK (London)
- Genres: New wave; synth-pop; art pop; new romantic
- Length: 43:37
- Label: Chrysalis
- Producers: Conny Plank; Ultravox

Ultravox chronology
Three into One (1979)	Vienna (1980)	Rage in Eden (1981)

Singles from Vienna
- 1. "Sleepwalk" Released: June 20, 1980; 2. "Passing Strangers" Released: September 26, 1980; 3. "Vienna" Released: January 9, 1981; 4. "All Stood Still" Released: May 29, 1981

Vienna is the fourth studio album by British new wave band Ultravox, first released on July 11, 1980 through Chrysalis Records. Vienna was Ultravox's first album with their best-known line-up, after Midge Ure had taken over as lead vocalist and guitarist following the departures of John Foxx and Robin Simon, as well as the group's first release for Chrysalis. The album peaked at number 3 in the UK Albums Chart and reached the top ten in Australia, New Zealand and several European countries.

Vienna was produced by German producer Conny Plank who had also produced Ultravox's previous album Systems of Romance, and mixed at Plank's studio near Cologne, Germany. Ultravox changed pace, style and audience with the arrival of Ure, who had already participated in the formation of Visage with Ultravox's keyboard and viola player Billy Currie. Many different styles are in use on the album; "Astradyne" is a long instrumental featuring sweeping, majestic synthesizer arrangements throughout, while "Mr. X" is a simpler, much sparser Kraftwerk pastiche. The lyrics to the album's songs were mainly written by Ure and drummer Warren Cann, who also takes a rare lead vocal on "Mr. X".

Four singles were released from the album. "Sleepwalk" was released as a single in June 1980, and was followed by "Passing Strangers" in September 1980, "Vienna" in January 1981 and "All Stood Still" in May 1981. "New Europeans" was used in a Japanese television commercial and released as a single in Japan, earning a gold disc.

In terms of sales, the album had a slow start, but the release in January 1981 of the title track as the third single from the album heralded the band's commercial breakthrough worldwide and led to healthy sales throughout 1981.

Vienna was remastered and re-issued on CD in 2000 on the EMI Gold label. This release also included a selection of B-sides from the album's singles as bonus tracks as well as the promotional video for the "Vienna" single. A remastered Definitive Edition of Vienna was released in 2008, which included a second disc of rare and previously unreleased tracks, and a 40th anniversary six-disc Deluxe edition was released in October 2020.

== Background ==
Writing and rehearsing the songs for the album began in autumn 1979, shortly after Midge Ure had joined the band. Among the first tracks written were "Astradyne", "Mr. X" and "New Europeans". As opposed to the band's previous albums, the music was written collectively by the four members by throwing ideas back and forth between them and then working on the ideas and turning them into song structures. Warren Cann contributed to the lyric writing as Ure, who would later write more of the band's lyrics, was still settling in as a new member. Cann wrote the bulk of the lyrics to "Sleepwalk", "Mr. X", "Private Lives", "All Stood Still" and "New Europeans".

Following a live gig in London in February 1980 Chrysalis Records had become interested in the band and gave them studio time to record some demos. The band decided to concentrate on one song and record it properly. They recorded "Sleepwalk" and were offered a contract by Chrysalis.

The tracks for the album were then recorded at RAK Studios in London and later mixed in Conny Plank's studio in Germany. The song "Vienna", which had been written quickly in early 1980, was seen by the band as the musical high point of the album and the song that best represented what they wanted to do, so they decided to make it the title track of the album. However, a few test pressings of the album were made with the alternative title Torque Point on the sleeve.

== Critical reception ==
Professional ratings
Review scores
Source	Rating
AllMusic	4.5/5 stars
Christgau's Record Guide	C
Mojo	4/5 stars
Q	3/5 stars
Record Mirror	3.5/5 stars
Rolling Stone	2/5 stars
The Rolling Stone Album Guide	4/5 stars
Smash Hits	8/10
Sounds	4.5/5 stars
Uncut	7/10

Reviews for Vienna were mixed, with Ure's introduction and the move towards mainstream pop dividing critics. In Sounds, John Gill gave the album an enthusiastic review, and challenged the reader, "I dare you to find another band who can mix Euro systems-rock, electronics, Can's fairground style and English music with such panache". In Smash Hits, reviewer Steve Taylor was similarly enthusiastic, giving the album an 8 out of 10 rating: "The addition of talented Midge Ure", Taylor wrote, "has done these leading lights of electro-pop nothing but good. This is tough, emotive music for all the cleverness of the arrangements and the technical skill that has gone into the playing and production... Synthesizer music with backbone and muscle."

Penny Kiley of Melody Maker was generally positive but felt the album contained weak moments, saying that "the first half of side two reveals the most tedious liabilities. Electronic clichés are no worse than guitar clichés, but they're more likely to sound pompous." Overall, however, she concluded, "Ultravox deserve success. This should do the trick."

Philip Hall of Record Mirror felt that although "Ultravox make all the right noises, they are never capable of writing consistently memorable pieces ... Vienna is full of conventional electronic rock songs which are beautifully executed but never inspiring."

NME's Chris Bohn was also indifferent, calling Vienna "an album of gaudy, sometimes magnificent, but mostly hollow edifices, housing songs that replace Foxx's elliptical imagery with clumsily verbose descriptions of similar scenery", and described that imagery as "seemingly derived from Hollywood films of the continent ... it's similarly full of glamour and lacking in true essence". The review presciently concluded, "Despite their wanton plagiarism and less clearly defined ideas, Vienna will probably be the album that makes Ultravox because, unfettered of Foxx's commitment, they're free to compromise themselves a touch to suit contemporary tastes."

American music publication Billboard named Vienna as one of its "recommended LPs" in August 1980. Rolling Stone's Debra Rae Cohen was more critical and found that Ultravox "seem reduced to mimicking their earlier achievements", panning the album's "overblown arrangements" and "familiar and banal electronic effects." Critic Robert Christgau dismissed Vienna as "dance music for the locked pelvis."

Reviewing the 2000 reissue for Q, David Quantick called Vienna the band's "best album" and said that "there were fine singles such as 'Sleepwalk' and 'All Stood Still' and the title track which – like a cartoon hippo – remains pompous yet loveable." Peter Kane's review of the deluxe version for Q eight years later was less favourable, describing the album as "sounding as cold and artificial as ever".

Also reviewing the 2008 version, Mojo's David Buckley said that "[the title track]'s studied grandeur has aged far less well than the electro-rush of lead-off single 'Sleepwalk', the instrumental 'Astradyne', or the punishing riff-rock of 'New Europeans'. Ultimately, Vienna, with its winning formula of cold futurism and big rock textures, took Ultravox out of the margins and into the big-haired '80s mainstream." Buckley was more complimentary in a 2020 reappraisal for Mojo, noting it as the album where Ultravox "transformed (or transmogrified, for many lovers of the original line-up) into chart contenders; nothing whatsoever wrong with that."

AllMusic critic David Jeffries said, "There are plenty of pretentious and pompous moments at which Foxx-era purists cringe, but taken as a snooty rebellion against the guitar-heavy climate of the late '70s, they're ignorable ... Add Anton Corbijn's photography and Peter Saville's smart cover design and all the ingredients for an early-'80s classic are there. A few albums later, it would all seem like a fluke, but on Vienna, all the pieces come together."

== Track listing ==
All songs written and composed by Warren Cann, Chris Cross, Billy Currie and Midge Ure.

European version

Side one

1. "Astradyne" – 7:07
2. "New Europeans" – 4:01
3. "Private Lives" – 4:06
4. "Passing Strangers" – 3:48
5. "Sleepwalk" – 3:10

Side two

1. "Mr. X" – 6:33
2. "Western Promise" – 5:18
3. "Vienna" – 4:53
4. "All Stood Still" – 4:21

North American version

Side one

1. "Sleepwalk" – 3:10
2. "Passing Strangers" – 3:48
3. "New Europeans" – 4:01
4. "Private Lives" – 4:06
5. "Astradyne" – 7:07

Side two

1. "Mr. X" – 6:33
2. "Western Promise" – 5:18
3. "Vienna" – 4:53
4. "All Stood Still" – 4:21

2000 reissue bonus tracks

10. "Waiting" (B-side of "Sleepwalk") – 3:51
11. "Passionate Reply" (B-side of "Vienna") – 4:17
12. "Herr X" (German version of "Mr. X" – B-side of "Vienna" 12") – 5:49
13. "Alles Klar" (B-side of "All Stood Still") – 4:53
14. "Vienna" (promotional video for single)

2008 Remastered Definitive Edition Disc one is the same as the original European release/album.

Disc Two

1. "Sleepwalk" (early version) – 3:23
2. "Waiting" – 3:51
3. "Face to Face" (recorded live at St Albans, 16 Aug 1980 – B-side of "Passing Strangers") – 6:04
4. "King's Lead Hat" (Brian Eno) (recorded live at The Lyceum, 17 Aug 1980 – B-side of "Passing Strangers" 12") – 4:06
5. "Passionate Reply" – 4:17
6. "Herr X" – 5:49
7. "All Stood Still" (12" version) – 5:08
8. "Alles Klar" – 4:53
9. "Keep Talking" (cassette recording during rehearsals) – 6:23
10. "Sleepwalk" (recorded live in rehearsals at The Lyceum, 17 Aug 1980) – 3:43
11. "All Stood Still" (recorded live in rehearsals at The Lyceum, 17 Aug 1980) – 4:35

2020 40th Anniversary Deluxe Edition Disc one: original 1980 analog master

1. "Astradyne" – 7:07
2. "New Europeans" – 4:06
3. "Private Lives" – 4:08
4. "Passing Strangers" – 3:50
5. "Sleepwalk" – 3:23
6. "Mr. X" – 6:31
7. "Western Promise" – 5:22
8. "Vienna" – 4:54
9. "All Stood Still" – 4:23

Disc two: Steven Wilson stereo mix

1. "Astradyne" – 7:09
2. "New Europeans" – 4:03
3. "Private Lives" – 4:13
4. "Passing Strangers" – 3:54
5. "Sleepwalk" – 3:19
6. "Mr. X" – 6:32
7. "Western Promise" – 5:20
8. "Vienna" – 5:03
9. "All Stood Still" – 4:35
10. "Waiting" – 4:08
11. "Passionate Reply" – 4:30
12. "Alles Klar" – 5:04
13. "Herr X" – 6:00

Disc three: Rarities

1. "Sleepwalk" (early version) – 3:22
2. "Waiting" – 3:54
3. "Face to Face" (Live in St. Albans, 16 August 1980) – 6:03
4. "King's Lead Hat" (Live at the Lyceum, 17 August 1980) – 4:08
5. "Vienna" (single version) – 4:42
6. "Passionate Reply" – 4:20
7. "Herr X" – 5:53
8. "All Stood Still" (single version) – 3:44
9. "Alles Klar" – 4:56
10. "Keep Talking" (cassette recording during rehearsals) – 6:23
11. "All Stood Still" (12" mix) – 5:07
12. "Sleepwalk" (soundcheck, The Lyceum, 17 August 1980) – 3:44
13. "All Stood Still" (soundcheck, The Lyceum, 17 August 1980) – 4:36
14. "Vienna" (live video version, St. Albans City Hall, 16 August 1980) – 5:29
15. "Sleepwalk" (live video version, St. Albans City Hall, 16 August 1980) – 3:41

Disc four: Cassette recordings during rehearsals, 1979/1980

1. "Astradyne" – 7:15
2. "New Europeans" (Instrumental) – 3:30
3. "Private Lives" (Instrumental) – 6:13
4. "Passing Strangers" (Instrumental 1) – 7:32
5. "Sleepwalk" (Version 1) – 2:56
6. "Mr. X" – 5:50
7. "Western Promise" – 4:51
8. "Vienna" – 4:47
9. "All Stood Still" (Instrumental 1) – 4:33
10. "Sound on Sound" – 3:51
11. "Animals" – 4:10
12. "Sleepwalk" (Version 2) – 4:02
13. "Sound on Sound" (Instrumental) – 5:15
14. "Passing Strangers" (Instrumental 2) –
15. "All Stood Still" (Instrumental 2) –

Disc five: Live at St. Albans, 1980

1. "Astradyne" – 7:21
2. "New Europeans" – 4:19
3. "Passing Strangers" – 5:28
4. "Quiet Men" – 4:36
5. "Face To Face" – 6:05
6. "Mr. X" – 6:48
7. "Western Promise" – 5:23
8. "Vienna" – 5:15
9. "Slow Motion" – 3:52
10. "Hiroshima Mon Amour" – 7:35
11. "All Stood Still" – 4:31
12. "Sleepwalk" – 4:38
13. "Private Lives" – 4:42
14. "King's Lead Hat" – 5:03

Disc 6: Region 0 audio-only DVD Steven Wilson Mix of album and b-sides

- 24/96 5.1 surround sound mix
- DTS 24/96 5.1 surround mix
- DOLBY AC3 5.1 surround mix
- 24/96 LPCM stereo mix

1980 Original analog master on album and b-sides

- 24/96 LPCM stereo mix

== Personnel ==
Ultravox

- Warren Cann – drums, electronic percussion, backing vocals, lead vocals on "Mr. X" and "Herr X"
- Chris Cross – bass, synthesizers, backing vocals
- Billy Currie – piano, synthesizers, viola, violin
- Midge Ure – guitars, synthesizers, lead vocals (except on "Mr. X" and "Herr X")

Additional personnel

- Conny Plank – co-production
- Brian Griffin and Brian Aris – band photography

== Charts ==
=== Weekly charts ===
1980–1981 weekly chart performance for Vienna
Chart (1980–1981)	Peak position
Australian Albums (Kent Music Report)	4
Canada Top Albums/CDs (RPM)	80
Dutch Albums (Album Top 100)	2
German Albums (Offizielle Top 100)	22
Japanese Albums (Oricon)	79
New Zealand Albums (RMNZ)	2
Norwegian Albums (VG-lista)	18
Swedish Albums (Sverigetopplistan)	6
UK Albums (Official Charts)	3
US Billboard 200	164

2020 weekly chart performance for Vienna
Chart (2020)	Peak position
Belgian Albums (Ultratop Flanders)	137

=== Year-end charts ===
Year-end chart performance for Vienna
Chart (1981)	Position
Australian Albums (Kent Music Report)	25
Dutch Albums (Album Top 100)	43
New Zealand Albums (RMNZ)	9
UK Albums (BMRB)	15

== Certifications ==
Certifications for Vienna
Region	Certification	Certified units/sales
Australia (ARIA)	Platinum	50,000^{^}
Belgium (BRMA)	Gold	25,000^{*}
Netherlands (NVPI)	Gold	50,000^{^}
New Zealand (RMNZ)	Platinum	15,000^{^}
United Kingdom (BPI)	Platinum	300,000^{^}
^{*} Sales figures based on certification alone.^{^} Shipments figures based on certification alone.

== Release history ==
Region	Date	Label	Format	Catalog
Worldwide	11 July 1980	Chrysalis	LP	CHR 1296
Worldwide	11 July 1980	Chrysalis	cassette	ZCHR 1296
United Kingdom	1983	Chrysalis	CD	0946 3 21296 2 8
United Kingdom & Europe	10 April 2000	EMI Gold	Remastered CD	7243 5 25523 0 6
United Kingdom	22 September 2008	Chrysalis	Remastered Definitive Edition CD	CHRX 1296
Europe	22 September 2008	Chrysalis	Remastered Definitive Edition CD	5099923436527
United Kingdom & Europe	15 December 2014	Weatherbox	Remastered 180 gram white vinyl with bonus 7" single	VIN180LP080
United Kingdom	9 October 2020	Chrysalis	5-CD/DVD Deluxe edition	
