= Reap the Wild Wind (song) =

Single by Ultravox

from the album Quartet
- B-side: "Hosanna (In Excelsis Deo)"
- Released: September 17, 1982
- Recorded: 1982
- Studio: AIR, London; AIR, Montserrat
- Genre: Synth-pop
- Length: 3:44
- Label: Chrysalis
- Songwriters: Warren Cann; Chris Cross; Billy Currie; Midge Ure
- Producer: George Martin

Ultravox singles chronology
"The Voice" (1981)	"Reap the Wild Wind" (1982)	"Hymn" (1982)

"Reap the Wild Wind" is a song by British new wave band Ultravox, released on September 17, 1982 as the lead single from their sixth studio album Quartet, recorded at the AIR Studios in London and Montserrat and released on Chrysalis Records.

It reached No. 12 on the UK Singles Chart and is the only single by Ultravox that charted on the US Billboard Hot 100.

== Critical reception ==
Reviewing the single for Record Mirror, Simon Hills gave "Reap the Wild Wind" a critical review. Hills commented on the song's grandiosity, speculating that frontman Midge Ure's upbringing in a Glasgow tenement might be the reason "he feels compelled to write such pompous music." He described the track as "pure commercial pop" wrapped in a "mass of swirling synthesizers," visually evoking arena-rock tropes like "dry ice and huge banks of lights." Hills also noted the involvement of former Beatles collaborators George Martin and Geoff Emerick, writing that they shaped the production "to make it sound like the pop equivalent of heavy metal’s Rush."

== Track listings ==
7" version

1. "Reap the Wild Wind" – 3:44
2. "Hosanna (In Excelsis Deo)" – 4:21

12" version

1. "Reap the Wild Wind" (extended version) – 4:43
2. "Hosanna (In Excelsis Deo)" – 4:21

== Chart performance ==
Chart (1982–1983)	Position
Australia (Kent Music Report)	69
Ireland (IRMA)	10
UK Singles Chart	12
US Billboard Hot 100	71
US Cash Box Top 100	58
