= Revisited (Cowboys International album) =

Compilation album by Cowboys International
- Released: 2003
- Recorded: 1979–1980
- Genre: New wave, synthpop
- Label: Pnuma
- Producer: Mick Glossop, Dennis Mackay

Revisited was a compilation by new wave band Cowboys International. It was released in 2003 by Pnuma Records, in USA.

It compiles songs from The Original Sin album, released in 1979, and other singles of the band released in 1979 and 1980, the year when the band broke up and singer Ken Lockie went solo.

The compilation is also noted for showing the number of members the band had during their brief existence. Many of them were in bands previously known in the punk and new wave era, and continued in other future projects, like Ken Lockie, who by 1981 joined Public Image Ltd.; Keith Levene, also of Public Image; Jimmy Hughes, ex-The Banned, and later in Department S; Terry Chimes, ex-The Clash and later with Generation X, Hanoi Rocks and Black Sabbath; Paul Simon, ex-Neo and Radio Stars, and later with Glen Matlock; Marco Pirroni, ex-Siouxsie and the Banshees and shortly after being in Cowboys International, in Adam and the Ants; and Stevie Shears, previously in Ultravox.

== Track listing ==
1. "Fixation" (4:10)
2. "Many Times (Revised)" (2:58)
3. "M(emorie) 62" (3:51)
4. "Thrash" (3:38)
5. "Aftermath" (Radio Mix) (2:17)
6. "Part of Steel" (3:26)
7. "Wish" (4:29)
8. "Future Noise" (3:01)
9. "Hands" (3:17)
10. "Here Comes a Saturday" (3:23)
11. "Today Today" (3:48)
12. "Original Sin" (3:48)
13. "Lonely Boy" (3:30)
14. "Millions" (2:38)
15. "Nothing Doing" (3:05)
16. "Too Much Too Little" (3:35)
17. "Pointy Shoes" (5:07)

== Personnel ==
- Ken Lockie - lead vocals, saxophone
- Evan Charles - keyboards, guitar, vocals
- Keith Levene - guitar (7)
- Jimmy Hughes - bass, vocals
- Terry Chimes - drums
- Rick Jacks - guitar
- Alan Rawlings - guitar
- Paul Simon - drums (16)
- Marco Pirroni - guitar
- Stevie Shears - guitar (16)
- Fiachra Trench - strings (16)
