= Girls at Our Best! =

English post-punk band

- Origin: Leeds, England
- Genre: Post-punk
- Years active: 1979–1982
- Labels: Record, Happy Birthday, Strange Fruit, Vinyl Japan, Cherry Red, Optic Nerve Recordings
- Past members: Judy "Jo" Evans; James "Jez" Alan; Gerard "Terry" Swift; Chris Oldroyd; Paul Simon; Darren Carl Harper; Rod Johnson

Girls at Our Best! were an English post-punk band, founded in Leeds, England in 1979 under the name The Butterflies. They had several UK Independent Singles Chart hits during their three-year existence.

== History ==
The group initially consisted of vocalist Judy "Jo" Evans, guitarist James "Jez" Alan, bassist Gerard "Terry" Swift and drummer Chris Oldroyd.

They took their new name from a line in their track "Warm Girls", released as the B-side to their self-financed 1980 debut single "Getting Nowhere Fast". The single, released in April 1980 on their own Record Records, reached No. 9 on the UK Indie Chart.

Oldroyd departed to join Music for Pleasure, and was replaced by Paul Simon (formerly of Limmie Funk Limited, Neo, Radio Stars, the Civilians and Cowboys International).

Second single "Politics", backed by "It's Fashion!", was released in November 1980, also on Record Records. It was distributed by Rough Trade, reaching No. 12.

Simon was replaced by Darren Carl Harper (formerly of the Expelaires) before Girls at Our Best! recorded their session for John Peel on 17 February 1981, which was first broadcast 23 February 1981.

The group's next single, "Go for Gold", issued in June 1981 by Happy Birthday Records, became their biggest Indie Chart hit, reaching No. 4.

On 20 October 1981, the group released their sole album, Pleasure. Rod Johnson shared drumming duties with Harper, who had left the band during the recording process in summer 1981. The album, the first to be released on the Happy Birthday label, came complete with a "Pleasure Bag" of stickers and postcards. Pleasure reached No. 2 on the UK Indie Chart and No. 60 on the UK Albums Chart., followed by the band's fourth single, "Fast Boyfriends" (backed by "This Train"), released by Happy Birthday in October 1981.

Girls at Our Best! split in 1982.

The band's 1981 Peel session, produced by Dale Griffin, was released as a 12" EP in 1987 by Strange Fruit Records. It featured "China Blue" and "This Train" on the A-side and a medley (titled "Getting Beautiful Warm Gold Fast from Nowhere") on the B-side.

Pleasure was reissued in 1994 by Vinyl Japan in an expanded edition that included the first two singles and "This Train". Another reissue, issued by Cherry Red Records on 18 May 2009, included the 1994 edition's bonus material as well as a four-song 1981 Richard Skinner session and a previously unreleased demo track. A 2014 double-vinyl reissue of the album by Optic Nerve Recordings featured the original album on the first LP and all four singles on the second.

== Other projects ==
Evans made a guest appearance on Thomas Dolby's 1982 album The Golden Age of Wireless (Dolby had guested on synthesizer on Pleasure).

Alan joined Sexbeat and later Tall Boys, and is now currently the head of the FD Music Production course at Leeds College of Music.

After leaving Girls at Our Best!, Simon formed the Fallout Club with Dolby, and later worked with Ken Lockie and Glen Matlock. In the 1990s, he formed Ajanta Music with his brother Robin (guitarist for Ultravox and Magazine).

== Legacy ==
"Getting Nowhere Fast" was covered by The Wedding Present, and included as a B-side on the latter's 1987 12" single "Anyone Can Make a Mistake". "Getting Nowhere Fast" was featured in the soundtrack of the 2023 Netflix mini-series Who Is Erin Carter?. The song "Politics" is featured in the Netflix series 'Ripper', as a backdrop to changing women's fashions around the late 70s when the post-punk music scene coincided with the hunt for the Yorkshire Ripper. The song "Getting Nowhere Fast" was featured in the 2021 Netflix film Mixtape.

== Members ==
- Judy "Jo" Evans – vocals (1979–1982)
- James "Jez" Alan – guitar (1979–1982)
- Gerard "Terry" Swift – bass (1979–1982)
- Chris Oldroyd – drums (1979–1980)
- Paul Simon – drums (1980)
- Darren Carl Harper – drums (1980–1981)
- Rod Johnson – drums (1981–1982)

== Discography ==
=== Studio albums ===
- Pleasure (1981, Happy Birthday Records) UK Indie Albums No. 2, UK Albums No. 60

=== Singles and EPs ===
- "Getting Nowhere Fast" (1980, Record Records) UK Indie Singles No. 9
- "Politics" (1980, Record Records) UK Indie Singles No. 12
- "Go for Gold" (1981, Happy Birthday Records) UK Indie Singles No. 4
- "Fast Boyfriends" (1981, Happy Birthday Records) UK Indie Singles No. 19
- The Peel Sessions EP (1987, Strange Fruit Records) UK Indie Singles No. 27
