= The Original Sin (album) =

Studio album by Cowboys International
- Released: 1979
- Genre: New wave
- Label: Virgin
- Producer: Dennis Mackay

Cowboys International chronology
The Original Sin (1979)	The Backwards Life of Romeo (2004)

Professional ratings
Review scores
Source	Rating
AllMusic	3/5 stars

The Original Sin is an album by Cowboys International, from the British post-punk new wave era. The band's lone album made Melody Maker's Top 20 poll in 1979 and received rave reviews from Rolling Stone magazine.

== Description ==
The overall feel is futuristic, high-tech keyboard-driven pop music. The sound of the album hints at many styles from David Bowie and The Psychedelic Furs with a hint of Brian Eno. In many ways it anticipated the coming New Romantic movement.

The Original Sin actually garnered a rave review from Rolling Stone's David Fricke and was included as number 11 on Melody Maker's Best Albums of 1979 list alongside Michael Jackson's Off The Wall, The Clash's London Calling, Talking Heads' Fear of Music and Elvis Costello's Armed Forces. "Here Comes A Saturday", the album's official single became a minor hit in the United States and "Thrash" and "Pointy Shoes" were staples of the New York City club scene. Still, the loose collective of a band didn't stick together and The Original Sin went out of print for over two decades.

The band comprised originally Ken Lockie (vocals), Keith Levene (guitar), Jimmy Hughes (bass), Evan Charles (piano) and Terry Chimes (drums). Almost all of the members had previous experience in the music business: Levene had played in an early version of The Clash and had recorded one album with Public Image Ltd, First Issue; Hughes had played in The Banned; and Chimes had been the drummer of The Clash. Levene only played on the album's final track, probably as guest, because on the rest of the album only Rick Jacks, who probably replaced him, played guitar.

Six months after the release of the album, only keyboardist Evan Charles and singer Ken Lockie remained from the lineup. The replacements had also some experience in music; Hughes got replaced by Lee Robinson, Boney M.'s studio musician, Chimes by Paul Simon, drummer with Neo and Radio Stars, and Rick Jacks by Allan Rawlings, Marco Pirroni and Stevie Shears. The band lasted until 1980.

== Track listing ==
All songs written by Ken Lockie.

1. "Pointy Shoes"
2. "Thrash"
3. "Part of Steel"
4. "Here Comes a Saturday"
5. "Original Sin"
6. "Aftermath"
7. "Hands"
8. "M(emorie) 62"
9. "Lonely Boy"
10. "The 'No' Tune"
11. "Wish"

== Personnel ==
Cowboys International

- Ken Lockie - vocals
- Jimmy Hughes - bass
- Terry Chimes - drums
- Evan Charles - piano
- Rick Jacks - guitar

with

- Keith Levene - guitar on "Wish"

Technical

- Dennis MacKay - producer
- Laurence Diana - engineer
- Pearce Marchbank - design
