= Ken Lockie =

- Also known as: Peter Dellow, Kenneth Lockie
- Born: 1956 (age 69–70); Newcastle upon Tyne, England
- Genres: New wave, post-punk, synthpop, techno, house
- Occupations: Musician, record producer
- Instruments: Keyboards, vocals
- Years active: Since 1970s
- Labels: Virgin Records, Pnuma

Kenneth Lockie (born 1956) is an English singer-songwriter and producer, best known as the principle songwriter and vocalist of English new wave band Cowboys International, as well as a collaborator with synth-pop group Dominatrix and John Lydon of Public Image Ltd.

== Early life and education ==
He was born in Newcastle upon Tyne in 1956 as Peter Dellow and changed his name to Ken Lockie by Deed poll on 8 January 1980.

== Career ==
=== Cowboys International ===
Ken Lockie, a keyboardist for Cowboys International, was recording his first Virgin album (The Impossible) when Simple Minds signed with the label. The band took an interest in his work after hearing backing tracks, and hired its producer Steve Hillage to produce their next album (Sons And Fascination).

Lockie fronted his own band Cowboys International, releasing the album The Original Sin (1979). The band recorded and played with many punk- and new wave-era musicians including:

- Terry Chimes from the English punk-rock band The Clash
- Jimmy Hughes of the English punk-rock and new-wave band The Banned and the British new-wave band Department S
- Keith Levene from the English post-punk band Public Image Ltd
- Marco Pirroni of the English rock band Adam and the Ants
- Steve Shears of the English new-wave band Ultravox
- Paul Simon of the English new-wave band Radio Stars

=== Solo career ===
The band toured extensively throughout the UK and in Europe in 1980, at which point Lockie pursued a solo career with Virgin Records, releasing the album The Impossible (1981), featuring guest appearances by Shears and Simon, as well as:

- Preston Heyman of the English rock band Tom Robinson Band
- Jim Kerr of the Scottish rock band Simple Minds
- John McGeoch of the English post-punk band Magazine
- Nash the Slash

=== Public Image Ltd ===
Later in 1981, Lockie went to the United States to join Public Image Ltd (PiL) in New York City, New York, in 1981 in preparation for recording in Chicago, Illinois, in November of that year. His contributions to PiL stemmed back to PiL's album Metal Box (1979) where he contributed and co-wrote "Radio 4" (although not officially credited).

Due to complications with Virgin and funding, recording in 1981 was delayed. PiL entered into various recording sessions in New York City during this period until finally entering into Park South Studios to record what became Commercial Zone (1984) in 1982 and 1983. At this point, Lockie was no longer a contributor to PiL.

=== Independent Producer ===
After his departure from PIL in 1982, Lockie found some success in dance music, co-producing, with Ivan Baker; and co-writing, with Stuart Agarbright, the song "Dominatrix Sleeps Tonight". Arthur Baker of Streetwise Records picked up on the single and it became a success in the spring of 1984 (number one on the Billboard Dance Chart for ten weeks). This track would later become part of the soundtrack to the American comedy film Grosse Pointe Blank (1997). In 1985, CBS / Epic Records released the 12" single "Get on Top" and "K2" under the band name Go For Your Gun, produced by Ken Lockie the single featured Stuart Argabright and Laura Lockie.

=== Pnuma Recordings ===
In 2003, he founded his own label Pnuma Recordings, and re-issued a collection of Cowboys International recordings from The Original Sin album and various singles on CD. He recorded a new Cowboys International album The Backwards Life of Romeo (2004), performing a live show at Eyedrum in Atlanta, Georgia, in 2005. In 2011 and continuing to 2019, Lockie began producing and releasing Techno, Tech House, Minimal, Deep House, and other genres on the Pnuma Recordings label.

== Discography ==
=== Cowboys International ===
Studio albums

- 1979 – The Original Sin
- 2004 – The Backwards Life of Romeo

Compilations

- 2003 – Revisited

Singles

- 1979 – "Thrash"
- 1979 – "Aftermath"
- 1979 – "Nothing Doing"
- 1980 – "Today Today"

=== Solo ===
Studio albums

- 1981 – The Impossible

Singles

- 1981 – "Dance House"
- 1981 – "Today"

=== Related releases and collaborations ===
- 1979 – "Radio 4" – by Public Image Ltd; keyboards
- 1981 – Sons and Fascination/Sister Feelings Call – by Simple Minds; backing vocals

== See also ==
- List of people from Newcastle upon Tyne
