= Going Left Right =

- 7" UK release

Single by Department S
- A-side: "Going Left Right"
- B-side: "She's Expecting You"
- Released: 19 June 1981
- Genre: Post-punk
- Label: Stiff Records
- Songwriters: Vaughn Toulouse, Mark Taylor, Mike Herbage
- Producer: David Tickle

Department S singles chronology
"Is Vic There?" (1981)	"Going Left Right" (1981)	"I Want" (1981)

"Going Left Right" is the second single by post-punk band Department S, released on 19 June 1981 on Stiff Records. It was their second single, following "Is Vic There?", and was produced by David Tickle.

== Reception ==
The song reached No. 55 on the UK Singles Chart despite considerable airplay. Guitarist Mike Herbage later described the song as "an aggressive, trance and beat driven track" but expressed surprise at the fact that it charted at all, calling its placing "probably higher than it had any right to, really". Vocalist Vaughn Toulouse was a bit more positive, saying, "I think 'I Want' and 'Going Left Right' are ... really representative of the band". In a later interview, Herbage admitted that "Going Left Right" and third single "I Want" were both "very strong tracks" and added, "we worked so hard on '[Going Left Right]'"

Retrospective reviews for the song were universally positive. Paolo Hewitt of Melody Maker said that it and "I Want" were "far superior" to "Is Vic There?", Mimi von Tussle of Sputnikmusic called it "always a crowd-pleaser" and "sublime", while Leonard's Lair said that it "matched 'Is Vic There?' for swagger and military precision". Dave Thompson of AllMusic said that it "stands among the finest songs of the entire post-punk early '80s".

== Track listing ==
=== 7" single ===
Side A
No.	Title	Length
1.	"Going Left Right"

Side B
No.	Title	Length
1.	"She's Expecting You"

=== 12" single ===
Side A
No.	Title	Length
1.	"Going Left Right (Extended Version)"

Side B
No.	Title	Length
1.	"She's Expecting You"
2.	"Is Vic There? (French Version)"

== Personnel ==
Department S

- Vaughn Toulouse – vocals
- Mike Herbage – keyboards, guitar on "She's Expecting You"
- Mark Taylor – guitar, keyboards on "She's Expecting You"
- Tony Lordan – bass guitar
- Stuart Mizon – drums

Technical

- David Tickle – production
- David Tickle, Steven W. Tayler – engineering
