= Sammy thrashLife =

American painter (born 1985)

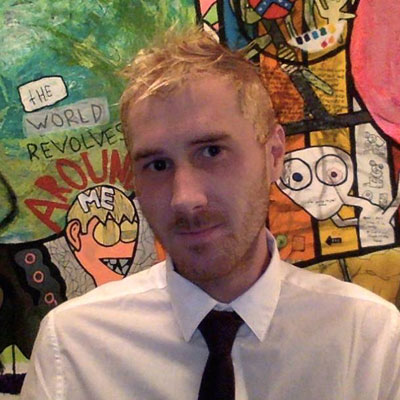
- Sam "Sammy thrashLife" North in October 2015
- Born: Samuel Thompson North; November 4, 1985 (age 40); New York City, New York, U.S.
- Education: Georgetown University Law Center, JD '11; University of South Florida
- Known for: Outsider art Neo-expressionism; Blogging; Art therapy
- Website: samnorth.art

Sam North (born November 4, 1985, in New York, NY), previously known as Sammy thrashLife, is an American painter and writer, best known for his art and blog, chronicling his experiences with borderline personality disorder, his history with heroin addiction and recovery, and his involvement in the American punk rock scene.

In December 2025, he posted on Instagram that he would be going by the name "Sam North" going forward.

== Early life ==
North is the son of musician Ian North of Milk 'N' Cookies and Neo, and Darkjet.

He began attending therapy as a toddler. After graduating high school, he struggled with heroin addiction. North graduated from the Georgetown University Law Center, but did not take the bar exam.

== Art ==
North first began drawing and painting in late 2012 while at Tranquil Shores, an inpatient facility for the treatment of substance abuse and mental illness. His first exhibit was just months after his release from Tranquil Shores, in the lobby of a movie theater, the historic Sun-Ray Cinema of Jacksonville, FL. Since then, North has exhibited around the country, including his first gallery showing with Ettra in Delray Beach, FL. In 2015, his participation in Instinct Gallery's "The Meds I'm On" exhibit generated positive reviews and press coverage.

North's art is characterized by bright colors, "funny faces," and – as one journalist noted – "phrases and at times, paragraphs, of honesty ... raw accounts of his every day life; be it good, bad, or ugly." Visually, he's garnered comparisons to Jean-Michel Basquiat but the text written across his canvases more directly (and in great detail) addresses his issues with girls, love, sex, self-esteem, anxiety, and identity.

In a biographical article for Folio Weekly, Janet Harper wrote, "Sam's openness with his art, and with perfect strangers, could be off-putting, the way he lets his guard down almost instantly and chats easily about the darkest parts of his life. He's open about his mental illness and drug addiction. About his issues with women and his need to be accepted and adored ... But Sam's brutal honesty, always with a dose of narcissism and boyish charm, makes it easy to be comfortable around him, and to trust him ... It's a rare trait, and one that leaves an impact on almost everyone he meets. He gives so much of himself, both through his art and the short biographical stories he includes with each piece – which is exactly why it's selling."

"Have Sex With and/or Buy Art From Me" by Sammy thrashLife

A review of a 2015 show in Minneapolis similarly noted, "While displays fill the gallery, the hectic work of artist Sammy North steals the show. When walking into the gallery, the first image you see straight ahead on the back wall is a jumbled mess of color captioned with a commanding "HAVE SEX WITH AND/OR BUY ART FROM ME." After a light giggle from this order, you make your way to the piece and start reading the lighthearted fine print that lets you know that the aforementioned options are Sammy's only worth in this life. The dark, humorous piece, like many others he has on display, takes you on an introspective journey that leads you through Sammy's struggles with drugs, women, and depression—all of course presented with a special kind of dark humor that elicits simultaneous sadness and happiness. The piece features vibrant colors and characters that seem lifted from some darker, more anxious version of Adventure Time. All of Sammy's pieces in the show have this same laughable-but-sad style that creates a special kind of closeness between him and viewers. I wouldn't be surprised if I now know more about his life than some of his friends do."

== Music ==
North is responsible for Traffic Street Records, has played in a number of punk bands, has created art for other groups, and is an occasional contributor to Razorcake magazine, for whom he's interviewed Banner Pilot and Rational Anthem. Other notable interviews include Off with Their Heads for Punknews.org in 2007.

=== Traffic Street Records ===
While in attendance at Georgetown University Law Center, North founded and operated an independent record label, Traffic Street Records. When his heroin addiction spun out of control post-graduation in the fall of 2011, a deal was struck with Kiss of Death Records to manage Traffic Street's catalog and fulfill all pending orders. In its active years, Traffic Street released recordings by Andrew Jackson Jihad, The Dopamines, The Brokedowns, The Measure, The Taxpayers, and many others.

While North oversaw all elements of production at Traffic Street, he did not often create album covers himself. Artists responsible for Traffic Street album covers include Mitch Clem, Aldo Giorgini, and Lauren Denitzio.

=== Bands ===
==== Extra Day For Riots ====
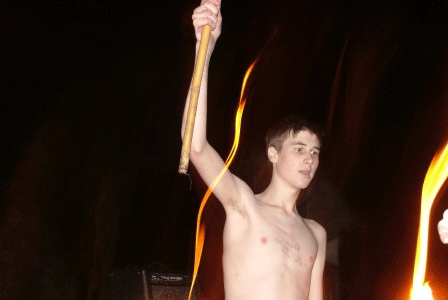
Sam North of Extra Day For Riots, during the band's set in Venice, FL in December 2003.

As a teenager, North sang for Florida band, Extra Day For Riots. The band lasted from 2003 to 2005. In a 2013 interview, drummer Chris Hembrough, said of his time with the group: "Before Rational [Anthem], I played in a band called Extra Day For Riots in high school. My buddy, Sam North, who used to run Traffic Street Records, was the singer. We just played basic simple pop punk. Really jumpy blink-182-esque stuff. We won a talent show and did lots of drugs. The band broke up after we almost killed each other at band practice."

- The Most Fun I Ever Had CDEP (self-released, 2004)
- Keeping '95 Alive CDEP (self-released, 2005)

==== Troublemake ====
After the demise of Extra Day For Riots, North formed Troublemake, a band consisting of himself as songwriter/singer/bassist and whichever friends he could gather up to record his songs or play shows. In contrast to Extra Day For Riots, Troublemake was warmly received by critics. Of the group's second EP, Feral, Jersey Beat wrote, "Sloppy lo-fi bedroom recordings never sounded so good before" and further praised "the socially fitting and heartfelt lyrics, sung with emotion and angst." Razorcake's similarly enthusiastic review of the band's split EP with Turkish Techno described Troublemake as "a solid anathematic band, hailing from D.C., but making sounds in the Dillinger Four universe. This feels more produced than earlier songs—but with the strong, eager oomph they've always had—driving the songs with a spirit you can get on board with. This is the kind of stuff that makes house parties pop, getting everyone to sing and scream together." Much more of a project than an active band, Troublemake's only activity was recording sporadically in the years 2005, 2006, and 2008, and several shows in support of Rational Anthem during that band's tour in the summer of 2008.

- Staying Afloat in Florida CDEP (self-released, 2005)
- Feral CDEP (self-released, 2007)
- Turkish Techno / Troublemake 7-inch split (Traffic Street Records, 2009)
- Dangerous Intersections V 7-inch compilation (Traffic Street Records, 2009; also featuring The Legendary San Diego Chargers, Shang-a-Lang, and Andrew Jackson Jihad)
- Dirt Cult Mix Tape, Vol. II (Dirt Cult Records, 2009; also featuring Tenement, Vacation Bible School, Unwelcome Guests, and others).

==== Shitty Children ====
In the summer of 2014, North fronted a Chicago-based band called Shitty Children. The band performed in Chicago just once before being invited to play at the eighth annual Awesome Fest in San Diego, CA. In announcing their addition to the bill, festival organizer Marty Ploy wrote, "Super stoked on this! Sammy thrashLife has been a huge inspiration the last couple years and really is just rad as fuck. Come see his band with the dudes from Like Bats and ex-members of Rational Anthem." While thrashLife, bassist Chris Spillane, and drummer were constant members of the band, Shitty Children had a different guitarist at each of the three shows they played before disbanding. No studio recordings were ever produced but a live video with lyrics was posted on thrashLife's website shortly after the band's first performance.

=== Design ===
As a visual artist, North has designed album art and merchandise for Todd Congelliere and Apocalypse Meow, Rational Anthem, Lipstick Homicide, Like Bats and others.

== Film ==
In the summer of 2013, North auditioned for, and was cast in, the short film No Real Than You Are. The film premiered to a sold-out audience at the 2014 Sarasota Film Festival and found its first overseas audience at the Cannes Film Festival in France.

== Legal troubles ==
In July 2015, North was given two years probation for a drug conviction.

On August 25, 2015, the state of Illinois charged North with criminal sexual assault. He was accused of choking and raping a woman in his van in Chinatown, Chicago on June 27. On August 29, a blog entry appeared on North's website, stating: "I didn’t do this. The truth will come out." At a preliminary hearing on September 15, a circuit court judge ruled there was no probable cause to believe thrashLife had committed any crime and the charges against him were dismissed.

In 2016, North was involved in a car crash; he hit one car, which hit another, and resulted in no injuries. North was accused of driving under the influence and charged with three DUIs. His felony was eventually reduced to a misdemeanor.
