= Today Today (song) =

- Cover art for UK release

Single by Cowboys International
- B-side: Fixation
- Released: 29 February 1980
- Studio: Marcus Recording Studios, London
- Genre: Power pop
- Length: 3:46
- Label: Virgin
- Songwriter(s): Ken Lockie
- Producer(s): Ken Lockie

Cowboys International singles chronology
"Nothing Doing" (1979)	"Today Today" (1980)

"Today Today" (sometimes shortened to "Today") is a song by the English New Wave band Cowboys International, released in February 1980 as a single. It is their last single to be released.

== Review ==
Marshall Bowden of PopMatters said of the song in May 2004:

"Cowboys International are often credited with creating the blueprint for the New Romantic sound…Groups like ABC and Spandau Ballet tried very hard to create tracks like Cowboys' "Today", but they never achieved the kind of widescreen sound that the band does here, a perfectly realized balance between sweeping, romantic strings, broad washes of synthesizer color, and a rigid techno-beat.

== Release history ==
Today Today was released as a non-album track on 29 February 1980. 23 years later in 2003 it was added to the Cowboys International compilation album Revisited.

== Personnel ==
- Ken Lockie – Lead vocals
- Jimmy Hughes – Bass
- Terry Chimes – Drums
- Marco Pirroni – Guitar
- Evan Charles – Keyboards
