= Tran-Sister =

Single by Neo
- A-side: "Tran-Sister"
- B-side: "A Failed Pop Song"
- Released: November 10, 1978
- Recorded: 1978
- Genre: Protopunk, new wave
- Label: Jet Records
- Producer(s): Ian North (Side A); Steve Royal (Side B)

Tran-Sister was the first and only single released by the new wave band Neo, fronted by ex-Milk 'N' Cookies guitarist Ian North (vocals). Then, North, born in New York, was living in England since 1976, after the demise of his proto punk band Milk 'N' Cookies. Recorded by North and session musicians, who were Steve Byrd (guitar), John McCoy (bass) and Bryson Graham (drums). Byrd and McCoy left to join Gillan shortly afterwards. North returned to USA in 1979, after his VISA ran out.

By the time, a then waited album was also recorded, Neo, which was released in 1979, after Neo split up and North decided to be a solo artist. Neo was released as an Ian North album.

== Track listing ==
- A1: "Tran-Sister" - 2:28
- B1: "A Failed Pop Song" - 2:24

== Personnel ==
=== Members of Neo ===
- Ian North: vocals
- Steve Byrd: guitar
- John McCoy: bass guitar
- Bryson Graham: drums

=== Producers ===
- Ian North (A1)
- Steve Royal (B1)
