= Limmie =

Limmie is a given name. Notable people with the name include:

- Limmie Pulliam (1976–2026), American operatic tenor
- Limmie Snell (1948–1986), American soul singer, co-founder of Limmie & Family Cookin'
