= The Impossible (album) =

Studio album by Ken Lockie
- Released: 1981
- Studio: Advision Studios, London; Sound Suite, Camden; The Town House, London
- Genre: New wave, synthpop
- Label: Virgin
- Producer: Richard Manwaring, Steve Hillage

Singles from The Impossible
- 1. "Dance House" Released: 1981; 2. "Today" Released: 1981

The Impossible is the only solo album of English singer Ken Lockie, after dissolving his band, Cowboys International, in 1980. It was released by Virgin Records, in 1981, and was recorded with the help of two of the former Lockie bandmates in Cowboys International, guitarist Stevie Shears and drummer Paul Simon, and other known musicians, like John McGeoch of Siouxsie and the Banshees (guitar), John Doyle (drums), Preston Heyman of Tom Robinson Band (drums), Joe Dworniak of Shake Shake! and I-Level (bass), Jim Kerr of Simple Minds (backing vocals) and Nash the Slash. "Too Much and Too Little" was actually an uncredited Cowboys International track recorded in 1980 at Good Earth Studios.

== Track list ==
=== A side ===
1. "Dance House"
2. "Theme of the Impossible"
3. "Footsteps"
4. "Under My Skin"
5. "Twisting"

=== B side ===
1. "Too Much & Too Little"
2. "Stiletto"
3. "Tenderness of Fools"
4. "Puppet"
5. "As Good as Gold"

== Personnel ==
- Ken Lockie - lead vocals, piano, synthetics, saxophone, backing vocals
- Stevie Shears - guitar
- John McGeoch - guitar on "Footsteps"
- Joe Dworniak - bass
- Lee Robinson - bass on "Too Much and Too Little"
- Paul Simon - drums on "Too Much and Too Little"
- John Doyle - drums (A2, B2, B3, B5)
- Preston Heyman - drums (A1, A3, A4, B4)
- Bobby Collins, Suzie O'List - backing vocals
- Nash the Slash - violin on "Dance House"
- Jim Kerr - backing vocals on "Dance House"
- Fiachra Trench - string arrangement on "Too Much and Too Little"

Technical

- Alan Douglas, Gordon Fordyce, Nick Cook, Nick Launay, Peter Woolliscroft - engineer
- Brian Cooke - photography
