= Department S =

Department S may refer to:

- Department S (band), a British post-punk/new wave band
- Department S (TV series), a British television detective mystery series
