= Neo (album) =

Studio album by Ian North and Neo
- Released: 1979
- Recorded: 1978
- Studios: Kingsway Studios, London; DJM Studios, London
- Genres: Punk rock, new wave, power pop, hard rock
- Label: Aura Records
- Producer: Ian North

Ian North and Neo chronology
Neo (1979)	My Girlfriend's Dead (1982)

Professional ratings
Review scores
Source	Rating
Record Mirror	2/5 stars

Neo is a 1979 debut solo album by the American punk musician Ian North. It was recorded in 1978 in Ian Gillan's studio and released in 1979 by Aura Records. Although the album was released as a solo work of Ian North, he recorded it with three session musicians: Steve Byrd on guitar, John McCoy on bass and Bryson Graham on drums and they later formed Neo, as a "semi-band", because they were paid by North. Many songs were written by North while the band comprised him and the brothers Robin and Paul Simon. This line-up, the band's first played a gig during 1977. In early 1978, Robin Simon left to join Ultravox and, shortly afterwards, his brother Paul was sacked by North and joined Cowboys International.

North said in a 2007 interview that while the album was being recorded, ex-Deep Purple member Ian Gillan was watching Neo, and after the recording was finished, Byrd, McCoy and Graham left North, because Gillan invited to them to join his fledgling band Gillan. Shortly afterwards, North renewed Neo with true band members until 1979 when North returned to the USA.

It was not released on CD.

== Track listing ==
All songs written by Ian North

A-side

1. "If You Gotta Go"
2. "She Kills Me"
3. "Don't Dance"
4. "Heart"
5. "Tran-Sister"
6. "Heaven On Earth"
7. "The Robots"

B-side

1. "No Sound from 25"
2. "Hollywood Babylon"
3. "Girls in Gangs"
4. "Texas Modern"
5. "Kamikaze"

== Personnel ==
- Ian North - vocals
- Steve Byrd - guitar
- John McCoy - bass guitar
- Bryson Graham - drums
