= Trevor Herion =

- Also known as: John Herion
- Born: John Trevor Herion c. April 1959; Cork, Ireland
- Died: 1 October 1988 (aged 29)
- Genres: Synth-pop; new wave; electronic
- Occupations: Singer; songwriter
- Instrument: Vocals
- Years active: c. 1979–c. 1983
- Labels: Imperial Recordings Ltd.; Interdisc; Island
- Formerly of: The Civilians; the Fallout Club

Trevor Herion, born John Trevor Herion, (c. April 1959 – 1 October 1988) was an Irish singer and songwriter, born in Cork who formed part of the punk and new wave scenes in the 1970s and 1980s. He later became a solo artist, but was not commercially successful and died in 1988.

== Life and career ==
During the late 1970s, he was the lead vocalist in a locally successful pub band called "the B-52s", who later changed their name to "the Puritans" on discovering the existence of the similarly named US band. Failure to secure a recording contract meant the band's break-up but shortly after he was called to join as lead vocalist in a new wave band called the Civilians, comprised by the English musician Paul Simon (former Neo and Radio Stars) on drums, Mark Scholfield on guitar and Michael French on bass guitar. The band only released two singles: Made for Television/I See My Friends (Arista Records, November 1979) and without Herion or Simon and featuring Michael French on lead vocals In America/In Search of Pleasure (Secret, September 1980). After that, the band broke up (Later, Scholfield and French formed Academy One).

By 1980 or 1981, Herion and Simon reunited in another band, the Fallout Club, alongside former Bruce Woolley and the Camera Club's Thomas Dolby and Matthew Seligman. They only released three singles, which were "Falling Years"/"The Beat Boys", "Dream Soldiers", "Pedestrian Walkway", "Wonderlust"/"Desert Song" (Happy Birthday Records, 1981).

After the Fallout Club broke up, Herion went solo. He released a number of singles and his sole commercially unsuccessful studio album called Beauty Life (1983), an album produced by Steve Levine, best known for his work with Culture Club. The sleeve of Beauty Life and its singles were designed by famed Factory Records designer Peter Saville. Nevertheless, an argument over the unauthorised remixing of a 7" version resulted in Levine taking his name off the album and refusing to promote it.

During the 1980s, Herion began to suffer from severe depression. He committed suicide on 1 October 1988 at the age of 29.

== Discography ==
Studio album

- Beauty Life (1983)

Singles

- "Kiss of No Return" (1982)
- "Dreamtime" (1983)
- "Fallen Angel" (1983)
- "Love Chains" (1983)
