= Milk and Cookies =

Milk and Cookies or Cookies and Milk may refer to:

- Serving with or dunking a cookie or biscuit into milk
- Milk and Cookies, Marvel Superheroes from What The--?! comic
- "Milk and Cookies", a song by Melanie Martinez from the 2015 album Cry Baby
- Milk 'N' Cookies, an American band
