= The Plague (British band) =

English punk rock band

- Origin: South East London, England
- Genre: Punk rock
- Years active: 1976–1981, 2005–present
- Labels: Psycho, Evolution Records, Bin Liner Records
- Members: Marc Jefferies; Gareth Martin; Greg Horton; Neil Hiller
- Website: theplague.co.uk

The Plague are an English punk rock band. Formed in South East London during 1976, the band were initially in existence until 1981. They re-formed in 2005. Their original line-up was:

- Marc Jefferies – vocals, lead guitar
- Gareth Martin – vocals, rhythm guitar
- Graham Robinson – bass – Neil Hiller being the new bassist.
- Greg Horton – drums, vocals

The Plague are notable as a band who played London venue The Roxy many times, as well as many more shows all over the country. They also scored a minor hit with their 1978 single "In Love", which received Radio 1 airplay and became a favourite of the late John Peel, a long-time champion of underground music.

== Origins ==
After meeting at college Gareth, Graham and Marc noted a shared interest in bands such as The Damned, The Who and The Sex Pistols, and formed The Plague in the autumn of 1976. Drummer Greg Horton completed the line-up, and the band began playing together at a rehearsal space attached to a church in Bromley.

By early 1977 The Plague were playing locally, soon securing a regular slot at the Battersea Arts Centre – initially as support to musical-play "The Food Show". They were the first punk rock band to play at the venue, playing a twenty-minute set to open the show as well as providing a contemporary soundtrack to The Food Show in return for rehearsal space. As The Food Show was put on by the Inner London Education Authority (ILEA), the unlikely pairing played other ILEA venues together. However this was a short-lived arrangement after the band played soon-to-be fan-favourite "1, 2, Fuck You!" one night at a school. Despite requesting a punk show, school staff in the audience went berserk, almost leading to a fight between the school's PE teacher and the band/manager. The headmaster demanded an apology from The Plague, which was unforthcoming, so from that point onward they were banned from all ILEA venues – rather a fitting and appropriate state of affairs for a hungry teenage punk band in 1977.

Having recorded their first demo (containing such embryonic examples of their sound as: "Again and Again", "On The Dole", and "Nightmares") The Plague began their long-standing relationship with The Roxy club, playing shows with such punk luminaries as the UK Subs and Slaughter and the Dogs. Eventually the club manager Kevin St John would phone the band up when others had cancelled gigs at the last minute.

As well as regulars to the club the band brought with them their "Battersea Mob", a group of punks based at The Old Swan pub in Battersea. The Battersea Mob proved to be the most loyal of fans, some even trekking as far afield as Coventry and Manchester to see the band. It was during this time that the band wrote many songs including "Spies", "Personality Clash", "No Strings Attached", "End of the World", "Politician" and "Nuffin' Doing".

After The Roxy closed The Plague remained active, playing at the Institute of Psychiatry, Camberwell, and Toyah Willcox's club night "Mayhem". One outstanding gig at the Institute resulted in interest from CBS records.

== Early singles and career ==
"In Love" (backed with "Wimpy Bar Song") was released on two independent labels in 1978: Psycho Records and Evolution Records. Despite Radio 1 airplay for "In Love" and its backing by John Peel.

It was reported by Music Week in the 1 December 1979 issue that Ben Nisbet's and Ronnie Beck's publishing company had placed the "Wimpey Bar Song" and other masters of The Plague with the Evolution label.

The Plague's second single "Out With Me All Night" (backed with "Er!" and "I Don't Wanna Be Like Jimmy") was released in 1979 to little success.

== Disbanding ==
Sadly, around this time problems started to emerge within the band. Rhythm guitarist/vocalist Gareth Martin left in 1980. After that the remaining members tried to keep The Plague going, trying out vocalist Sue Slack for a while and eventually re-inventing themselves as Indoor Games with vocalist David Hood, who is still performing and now living back home in Scotland. Knowing that their initial chemistry was broken and feeling unable to continue, the band finally disbanded in 1981.

== The X Tapes ==
Following a resurgence of interest in original punk rock, Detour Records contacted the band in 2004 regarding the compilation of all The Plague's various demos and singles onto one vinyl/CD album. The result was The X Tapes ((p) and (c) 2005 Bin Liner Records), containing the following tracks:

1. "Come Together" (Lennon–McCartney)
2. "Lay Me in the Moonlight"
3. "In Love"
4. "Wimpy Bar Song" (B-side of "In Love" single)
5. "Nuffin' Doing"
6. "I Don't Wanna Be Like Jimmy" (B-side of "Out With Me All Night" single)
7. "Dog Days"
8. "The End of the World"
9. "Er!" (B-side of "Out With Me All Night" single)
10. "Out with Me All Night"
11. "Stop" (vocals by Sue Slack)
12. "On the Dole" (from the original Plague demo tape)
13. "Again and Again" (from the original Plague demo tape)
14. "Nightmares" (from the original Plague demo tape)

== Reunion and later years ==
The Plague got back together in 2005 when Gareth and Greg, who had remained in-touch, contacted Marc. Graham Robinson declined to rejoin, possibly because he is now living in Scotland, making rehearsals a difficult matter. They employed Chris Gambold as their replacement bassist and he was with the band until 2016. Since their reactivation, The Plague have played gigs in London and are working towards recording and releasing an album of brand new recordings, containing both new and old material.

The Plague released their latest album What Do You Expect in 2015. The album includes some originals such as "End of the World" and "On the Dole" as well as some new songs. All of which are available on their BandCamp page. In 2016, they have played numerous gigs in and around London playing old and new songs such as "In Love", their most popular song, and "Whammy Bar," their latest song. A couple of venues they have played being the Tottenham Chances Club and The Gunners. They have been promoting What Do You Expect as well as The X Tapes albums.

The group's single "In Love" was included on the Gary Crowley’s Punk and New Wave 77 track various artists compilation that was released in 2017.

The group played the Prince Albert in Brighton on Monday 30 December 2019. Their performance got them a good review by Scene Sussex in the site's 2 January 2020 publication.

On Saturday 28 Oct 2023, the group returned to the Prince Albert. They had Dirt Royal and Unorfadox as support acts. The band was made up of Simon Godfrey on vocals and bass, Lee Morrell on drums and Dave Leak on guitar. They opened with "Kick Us Down" and "Live Your Life". With what was described by Scene Sussex as a "top set nailed", they closed with "Mr Nice", then the ska-punk infused song "Fake News", and also Shit Happens.
