= Limmie Snell =

American singer (1948–1986)

- Also known as: Lemme B. Good, Limmie
- Born: October 4, 1948; Dalton, Alabama, U.S.
- Origin: Canton, Ohio, United States
- Died: May 27, 1986 (aged 37) Atlanta, Georgia, U.S.
- Genres: Rhythm and blues, soul
- Labels: Mercury Records, Psycho Records, Pye
- Formerly of: Limmie & Family Cookin'

Limmie Frank Snell, Jr. (October 4, 1948 – May 27, 1986) was an American soul singer.

== Background ==
Limmie Frank Snell, Jr. was born in Dalton, Alabama, United States. He grew up in Canton, Ohio, and attended McKinley Senior High School, but did not graduate.

According to another source, he was born in 1945. As Limmie B. Good, he began recording at the age of 11 for Columbia Records, Mercury Records and Warner Bros. Records. In early 1965, under the name "Lemme B. Good", Snell released the original version of "Good Lovin'", later a number one hit for the Young Rascals.

Later, he formed the group Limmie & Family Cookin'.

== Career ==
Based in Canton, the group Limmie & Family Cookin' consisted of Snell and two of his sisters, Martha and Jimmie. Jimmie Snell sang lead vocals on both "A Walkin' Miracle" and "You Can Do Magic". The group had one single on Scepter Records before signing with Atco Records. In the UK the group had three hit singles, "You Can Do Magic" (No. 3, UK 1973), "Dreamboat," (No. 31, UK 1973) and a cover version of The Essex's "A Walkin' Miracle" (No. 6, UK 1974).

After Limmie & Family Cookin' broke up, he remained in the UK and formed Limmie Funk then Limmie Funk Limited, short lived bands who toured the UK in 1976, and whose musicians later had varied success. The first band included Bill Holliday on guitar, who went on to be in Palm Beach Express and then CBS recording artists The Continentals, and also Peter Lodge, who also was a member of Palm Beach Express. Limmie Funk Limited included Tony Mansfield, Nick Straker and Phil Towner who, in 1976, formed New Musik, and the brothers Paul and Robert Simon, who joined numerous new wave bands in the late 1970s and 1980s, such as Neo, Girls at Our Best!, Radio Stars, Cowboys International, Ultravox and Magazine.

Snell wrote, and recorded music until his death from renal failure in May 1986 in Atlanta, Georgia, and was buried in Canton, Ohio.

He had several children and one of his sons, Limmie Snell Junior, still records music in Europe.
