= Fickle Public Speaking =

Single by Main T Possee
- Released: 1983
- Genre: Funk, soul, rock
- Label: Respond Records
- Songwriter(s): Vaughn Toulouse/Paul Weller
- Producer(s): Paul Weller

"Fickle Public Speaking" is a 1983 single by former Department S singer Main T Possee, with Paul Weller guesting on guitar. It charted at No. 89 on the UK Singles Chart.

Department S guitarist Mike Herbage has attacked this song, calling it "Lou Reed trying to be Isaac Hayes" and "abysmal".
