= Demon Music Group =

British record label

Demon Music Group Limited
- Parent company: BBC Studios
- Founded: 1980; 44 years ago
- Founder: Andrew Lauder; Jake Riviera
- Distributor: Self-distributor
- Country of origin: United Kingdom
- Location: London
- Official website: demonmusicgroup.co.uk

Demon Music Group Limited (DMG; formerly Object Enterprises Limited from 1982–1991 and Music Collection International Limited from 1991–2000) is a record company owned by BBC Studios that is mainly concerned with back-catalogue rights and re-issuing recordings as compilations on physical media (CDs and vinyl) via supermarkets and specialist stores.

== History ==
DMG started out as Demon Records, a British record label, founded in 1980 by former United Artists A&R executive Andrew Lauder and Jake Riviera. Riviera had previously started Stiff Records and, with Lauder, had also founded Radar Records in 1978 and F-Beat in 1979.

The label was originally planned to release one-off singles, with early releases from the Subterraneans (featuring NME journalist Nick Kent), the Spectres (formed by Glen Matlock), TV21, and Department S. Demon's first chart success came with Department S's "Is Vic There?" which reached No. 22 on the UK singles chart.

Further chart success followed with Bananarama's "Aie a Mwana". The label then changed direction towards launching long-term artists. Lauder left to join Island Records in 1981, and Demon started a subsidiary label, Edsel Records, the same year, for reissues of 1960s and 1970s albums. By 1982, Lauder had returned, and Demon had spawned further sub-labels, including Hi Records (the Memphis soul label) and Drop Out (psychedelic rock).

Demon was also the home of sub-label Zippo, which released albums by American artists such as Dream Syndicate, Green on Red, True West, Rain Parade, Russ Tolman, amongst others in the 1980s.

In 1998, Demon was acquired by Crimson Productions and the record label was merged with its Westside Records operation. In 2002, Westside issued a double CD compilation album of blues from Ace Records. The company is now known as the Demon Music Group and releases records by artists such as Jane McDonald and Marti Pellow. Demon is also the European licensee of the Hi Records catalog.

The firm is also known for releasing a large number of compilation albums, with multi-genre compilation brands including the Absolute Hits series of single-disc collections (through Crimson) and the budget-range 100 Hits series of five-disc box sets each themed to a particular genre or era of music. These have proved successful, with the 100 Hits series alone amassing sales of 1.5 million units in its first 18 months on sale. The firm also releases genre-based compilation sets through labels such as Harmless (funk) and Nascente (world music).

The artwork for the Nascente-released Beginner's Guide series (particularly Beginner's Guide to Africa) may have provided inspiration for similar artwork used by Blur on its 2009 EMI collection Midlife: A Beginner's Guide to Blur.

After licensing the recordings of Ant & Dec from Phoenix Music International for a series of greatest hits compilations, the Edsel label got a fluke number one when "Let's Get Ready to Rhumble" re-charted at the top in April 2013.

By the end of 2020, Demon's Crimson Productions had charted numerous times over the previous two years with its Gold series of 3CD 'hits and mixes' albums (with Dr. Hook being new at number 54 on the albums chart of 3 December 2020). A small number of these chart-bound Gold compilations would be based upon catalogue already owned by DMG, though most utilised the masters owned by Sony Music, with collections by Bros, M People and the Bangles being released. In addition to these compilations, Crimson Productions had also signed modern acts like Le Flex and country-pop trio the Adelaides.

== MP3 mastering of CDs ==
During 2013, Demon's subsidiary company Edsel released the entire Island Records back catalogue of Robert Palmer. There was initial concern on forums such as the Steve Hoffman boards that the mp3 files had been used as the masters of all eight albums, as many had returned their CDs. Annoyed fans scanned the files with professional audio analyzing software such as Adobe Audition and Audacity, to find that all the frequencies of the recordings were cut off at 16 kHz. The blog Superdeluxeedition had put these claims to the manager of Edsel Records, Val Jennings, who vehemently refuted the claims. Superdeluxeedition asked producer Nick Watson (who had worked for The Kinks, Faith No More, and the Libertines) for an expert opinion. Watson found the CDs spectrograms and audio were consistent with being mastered from mp3 files. The audio cuts off at 16 kHz and there are stereo artifacts. The manager of Edsel did not respond.

== Labels ==
- DMG TV (artist album projects); see also DMG TV artists
- Edsel (mostly re-issues)
- Demon Records (vinyl releases)
- 100 Hits (series brand)
- Harmless (funk and urban music collections)
- Music Club Deluxe (deluxe 2CD packages)
- Crimson
- Nascente (world music collections)
- Little Demon
- THE Red Box
- Demon Digital
- Imp
- Demon Vision (music DVDs)

== Artists ==
=== Crimson Productions ===
- The Adelaides
- Le Flex

=== Demon Edsel ===
- Belinda Carlisle
- T. Rex
- Graham Parker
- Ian Dury
- Sugar
- The Beat
- Alexander O'Neal
- The S.O.S. Band
- Cherrelle
- Average White Band
- Dog Trumpet
- Marion
- Leo Sayer
- Sheena Easton
- Suede
- Dead or Alive

=== DMG TV ===
- Daniel O'Donnell
- Foster & Allen
- The Soldiers

=== Demon Vision ===
- Sparks
- Siouxsie Sioux
- Marc Almond
- The Beautiful South
- Foster & Allen
- Johnny Cash
- Elvis Costello
- Sammy Davis Jr.
- T-Rex
- Frank Sinatra

== See also ==
- Lists of record labels
