= Hank Mizell =

American singer

- Born: William M. Mizell; November 9, 1923; Daytona Beach, Florida, United States
- Died: December 23, 1992 (aged 69) Murfreesboro, Tennessee, United States
- Genres: Rock and roll, country, rockabilly
- Occupations: Singer, songwriter, guitarist
- Instruments: Vocals, guitar
- Years active: 1956–1992
- Labels: Eko Records; Charly Records

Hank Mizell (November 9, 1923 – December 23, 1992) was an American singer, guitarist and songwriter. He is best-remembered for his rockabilly single "Jungle Rock" (1958), which was obscure on its original release but reached number 3 in the UK Singles Chart in 1976. In the Netherlands, it made it to number 1.

== Background ==
Born William M. Mizell in Daytona Beach, Florida, United States, Mizell moved to Asheville, North Carolina with his adoptive parents. He joined the United States Navy and served in the Second World War. After being discharged, he decided to take up singing professionally, with a band featuring guitarist Jim Bobo. Settling in Montgomery, Alabama, Mizell sang on local radio, where one of the presenters nicknamed him 'Hank', after the country singer Hank Williams.

== Career ==
=== 1950s to 1960s ===
Mizell recorded "Jungle Rock" in 1958 for Eko Records; the seemingly whimsical lyric tells of a narrator who happens upon a dance party in a jungle, with "a jungle drummer doing a knocked-out beat." The song did not chart but earned a positive review from Billboard, which suggested the song "would make good swingin' dance fare." "Jungle Rock" was reissued by King Records in 1959, but again failed to find success. He recorded a handful of additional singles, none of which were successful.

Mizell and Bobo continued playing live until 1962, when they split up. By this time, Mizell was married to Rosemary, with four children (including David Alan, John Mark and William Jr.), and he finally gave up music and became a preacher for the Church of Christ.

=== 1970s ===
In 1971, a Dutch bootleg compilation album, Rock n' Roll, Vol. 1, reissued "Jungle Rock", erroneously credited to Jim Bobo. The song came to the attention of Charly Records in the UK, who had scored hits with re-issued songs by American performers like The Shangri-Las. Charly then re-released "Jungle Rock" in March 1976, and it duly made Number 3 in the UK Singles Chart, and Number 1 in the Dutch charts. Mizell was 52 years old when he finally made it into pop's history books. When the record was played on BBC TV's flagship pop music show Top of the Pops in April 1976, host Tony Blackburn announced they could not find Mizell, and so the dance group Pan's People dressed in khaki blouses, shorts and pith helmets, danced along to the record with several extras in animal costumes representing the animals mentioned in the song (e.g., "a chimp and a monkey doing the Suzy-Q"). It is considered to be one of Pan's People's classic performances.

=== 1980s ===
Having been reported previously in the Dooley's Diary section of the September 15, 1979 issue of Music Week that Mizell was to sign a long-term contract with Hammer Records, it now looked like a certainty. The magazine reported in the January 19 issue that Mizell was the London-based label's first signing. The group, Hank Mizell & The Rock'n Rhythm Boys were rehearsing and writing material for their first Hammer release. A tour was planned for the following month.

== Later years ==
Later, Mizell was tracked down in Tennessee, and persuaded to come over to the United Kingdom. Mizell made another recording of the song. This was eventually re-released in 1999 on the German Repertoire label on CD (REP 4778-WG), with three bonus tracks.

== Death ==
Mizell died in Murfreesboro, Tennessee, in December 1992, aged 69.

== Legacy ==
A cover version of "Jungle Rock" appeared on The Fall's 1997 album, Levitate, interpreting Mizell's song via the jungle style of electronic dance music.

== Discography ==
=== Albums ===
- Jungle Rock (1976) – SWE #36

=== Singles ===
| Year | Single | Peak chart positions | | | | | | |
| Year | Single | BE (FLA) | BE (WA) | GER | NL 40 | NL 100 | SWE | UK |
|---|---|---|---|---|---|---|---|---|
| 1958 | "Jungle Rock" | — | — | — | — | — | — | — |
| 1959 | "Jungle Rock" (re-issue) | — | — | — | — | — | — | — |
| 1961 | "Two Minds So Different" (with Jim Bobo) | — | — | — | — | — | — | — |
| 1961 | "My Old Used to Say" (with Jim Bobo) | — | — | — | — | — | — | — |
| 1971 | "Alabama's Calling" (with Charles Reed) | — | — | — | — | — | — | — |
| 1976 | "Jungle Rock" (2nd re-issue) | 2 | 6 | 27 | 1 | 2 | 9 | 3 |
| 1976 | "Kangaroo Rock" | — | — | — | — | — | — | 59 |
| 1976 | "Easy Money" | — | — | — | — | — | — | — |
| 1976 | "Rakin' and Scrapin'" | — | — | — | — | — | — | — |
| 1977 | "Higher" (EP) | — | — | — | — | — | — | — |
| 1978 | "Jungle Rock" (3rd re-issue) | — | — | — | — | — | — | — |
| 1979 | "Burning Eyes" | — | — | — | — | — | — | — |
| 1981 | "Jungle Rock" (4th re-issue) | — | — | — | — | — | — | — |
| 2014 | "Jungle Rock" (5th re-issue) | — | — | — | — | — | — | — |

== See also ==
- List of number-one hits (Netherlands)
- List of performers on Top of the Pops
- Musikladen
