= Pleasure (Girls at Our Best! album) =

Studio album by Girls at Our Best!
- Released: 1981
- Recorded: Summer 1981
- Studio: Marcus Music Studios, London, England
- Genre: New wave, post-punk
- Length: 53:17
- Label: Happy Birthday
- Producer: Laurence Diana

Singles from Pleasure
- 1. "Go for Gold" Released: 1981; 2. "Fast Boyfriends" Released: 28 Nov 1981

Professional ratings
Review scores
| Source | Rating |
|---|---|
| AllMusic | 4/5 stars |
| Louder Than War | favourable |
| Uncut | 8/10 |

Pleasure is the sole studio album by Girls at Our Best!, released in 1981 by Happy Birthday Records. It reached No. 60 in the UK Albums Chart.

== Reception ==
A retrospective AllMusic review described the album as an "underrated delight" and compared the sound to Siouxsie and the Banshees and Gang of Four. Another, by the Louder Than War website, described it as "short, spikey pop" and a "well-crafted album".

== Track listing ==
- Tracks 1, 3, 4, 6, 8, 9 and 11 written by Girls at Our Best!. All others written by Judy Evans, James Alan and Gerard Swift.
1. "Pleasure"
2. "Too Big for Your Boots"
3. "I'm Beautiful Now"
4. "Waterbed Babies"
5. "Fun-City Teenagers"
6. "£600,000"
7. "Heaven"
8. "China Blue"
9. "Fast Boyfriends"
10. "She Flipped"
11. "Goodbye to That Jazz"

== Personnel ==
=== Girls at Our Best! ===
- Judy Evans: Vocals
- James Alan: Guitars, backing vocals
- Gerard Swift: Bass, backing vocals
- D. Carl Harper: Drums, percussion (on tracks 1, 3, 4, 6, 8 and 9)

=== Additional Personnel ===
- Rod Johnson: Drums, percussion (on tracks 2, 5, 7, 10 and 11)
- Alan Wakeman: Clarinet
- Dave Fishel: Piano and harpsichord
- Thomas Dolby: Synthesizers
