= Solid Gold Easy Action =

""Solid Gold Easy Action""
- German picture sleeve by Ariola label

Single by T.Rex

from the album Great Hits (1972)
- B-side: "Born to Boogie"
- Released: 1 December 1972
- Genre: Glam rock
- Length: 2:14
- Label: EMI
- Songwriter: Marc Bolan
- Producer: Tony Visconti

T.Rex singles chronology
"Children of the Revolution" (1972)	""Solid Gold Easy Action"" (1972)	"20th Century Boy" (1973)

Solid Gold Easy Action is a song by English rock band T. Rex, written by Marc Bolan. It was released as a single on 1 December 1972 and reached number 2 in the UK Singles Chart. The song did not feature on an original studio album but was included on the 1972 Great Hits compilation album issued by EMI Records, as well as most CD reissues of Tanx. It was beaten to number 1 in the UK Singles Chart by "Long Haired Lover from Liverpool" by Little Jimmy Osmond (one week).

== Lyrical content and recording ==
Kerrang! magazine founder Geoff Barton, wrote in an article for Classic Rock magazine that the first two lines of the song, "Life is the same and it always will be / Easy as picking foxes from a tree", appeared to predict Marc Bolan's own death in 1977. The number plate of the car Bolan was in during the fatal collision with a tree was FOX 661L. This is one of many supposed 'prophesies' surrounding Marc Bolan's death.

A working version of the song known as "Fast Blues Easy Action" was recorded on 2 August 1972, with the final take put down at Strawberry Studios, Chateau d'Herouville in France between 21–25 October. A special mix of the recording was used for the group's appearance on Top of the Pops, with Bolan writing "for show only-live vocal-girl low low strings-please track loud" on the tape box. "Solid Gold Easy Action" was the first T. Rex single since "Ride A White Swan" not to feature Flo & Eddie on backing vocals, with the female vocal duo Sue and Sunny used instead. This, plus the ultrafast tempo of the song, were noted by Bolan in a contemporary interview as attempts to disrupt the normal T. Rex formula.

== Reception ==
Like the previous single "Children of the Revolution", "Solid Gold Easy Action" stalled at number 2 on the UK chart as Bolan's popularity began to show the first signs of a mild slip. It was also less well received critically, with Danny Holloway of NME noting that the "main riff violates the speed limit" but otherwise "consists of cliches reworked to sound their own". Peter Jones of Record Mirror wrote that the song had a "shoulder shrugging approach which is a bit boring" yet conceded that "Marc has a dead-centre knack of knowing what is commercial..."

== Other versions ==
- The song was covered by Department S, with backing vocals provided by Thunderthighs as the B-side to the original Demon (D 1003) issue of the "Is Vic There?" single in 1980. Bananarama originally recorded the backing vocals but these were replaced by Thunderthighs on the released version.
- It was covered by The Fratellis in 2007 for the soundtrack of the film Hot Fuzz.
- Kim Wilde performed the song live during the second leg of her Perfect Girl tour in November 2007.
- In 2015, the song was used in an Asda advert in the UK.
- A portion of the song was featured in the third episode of The Good Guys.
- The song was also included in the movie The Dirt, based on the life and career of the heavy metal band Mötley Crüe.
- Two lines from the song are included at the end of "Top Twenty" by The Undertones.

== Track listing ==
1. "Solid Gold Easy Action" - 2:14
2. "Born to Boogie" - 2:04

There is a 12-second un-credited spoken intro on the b-side, titled "Xmas Message", which was later called "Xmas Riff" when it was included in the Rhino Singles compilation.

== Personnel ==
- Marc Bolan – lead vocals, guitar
- Mickey Finn – congas,
- Steve Currie – bass guitar
- Bill Legend – drums
- Sue and Sunny – backing vocals
- Tony Visconti – producer, string arrangement, backing vocals

== Chart performance ==
Chart (1972–1973)	Peak position
Australia (Go-Set Top 40)	39
Austria (Ö3 Austria Top 40)	13
France (SNEP)	68
Germany (GfK)	6
Ireland (IRMA)	4
Norway (VG-lista)	5
UK Singles (OCC)	2

== See also ==
- Bolan's Rock Shrine
