= Jimmy Hughes (British musician) =

James C Hughes

Background information
- Born: James C Hughes; London, England
- Genres: Rock, power pop, punk rock, new wave, blues
- Occupations: Musician, songwriter, record producer
- Years active: 1976–present
- Website: BoardwalkIsabella.com

James C Hughes is an English bassist who has played with many punk rock and new wave bands, and whose career as a rock musician and writer continues to this day.

== Biography ==
Born to Irish parents in London, Hughes, inspired by the glam rock sensibilities of his hero Ziggy Stardust, and the bass playing of Free's Andy Fraser, began his career in music at the birth of punk rock with power pop group the Banned, enjoying immediate success as their first single "Little Girl" broke into the UK top 30. After the Banned dissolved, Hughes joined Keith Levene's Cowboys International, forming a rhythm section with drummer Terry Chimes, ( formerly of the Clash ) , to release the album The Original Sin in 1979, then playing on the subsequent tours, television and radio appearances of the band. After a final TV appearance on The Old Grey Whistle Test (22 January 1980), Hughes left Cowboys International and joined N.M.E journalist Nick Kent's group The Subterraneans, subsequently appearing on their only single "My Flamingo" which was released in early 1981.

In 1980, having turned down audition requests from Woody Woodmansey, Alex Chilton's Big Star, and Marco Pirroni of Adam and the Ants, he joined Ian Broudie's band Original Mirrors, playing on an album and two singles including "Dancing with the Rebels". In 1981, he joined Department S, best known for their debut single, "Is Vic There?", in time to play on their unreleased album Sub-Stance, produced by David Tickle.

Hughes' subsequent work includes taking part in the first rock tour of the Middle East with the theatre rock band Famous Names; guesting on tracks for Paul Simonon's brother Nick Simonon's rockabilly band Whirlwind; Alan Wilder's solo album Hydrology Parts 1 and 2; as writer and performer on Paradise Now for the Norwegian rock band Oceans Apart; television appearances with La Toya Jackson; and playing with a diverse range of musicians including Mick Jagger, Jeff Beck, members of Cameo, Black, Greg Phillinganes, and Omar Hakim.

Hughes' own band Boardwalk Isabella released the Clear the Decks EP in 2015 and the single "Freedom (Step Up My Desire)" in 2016.

Jimmy Hughes toured the UK with the Bee Gees' musical and West End hit,You Win Again throughout 2017 before becoming bass player and MD to Serbian band, The Gift, based in Belgrade.

He is currently the bass player for award-winning act Absolute Bowie touring the UK and Europe.
