= Vaughn Toulouse =

- Also known as: Vaughn Toulouse
- Born: Vaughn Cotillard; 30 July 1959
- Origin: St. Helier, Jersey
- Died: 8 August 1991 (aged 32)
- Genres: Punk rock; post-punk; ska; new wave

Vaughn Toulouse (born Vaughn Cotillard; 30 July 1959 – 8 August 1991), was a British singer. He was a founding member of Guns for Hire and its successor band Department S.

Toulouse was born in St. Helier on the island of Jersey and raised in St Austell, Cornwall. He attended college in St Austell before dropping out in 1978 to tag along on tour with The Clash before moving to London in 1979, where he formed the punk/ska band Guns For Hire. The band released the single "I'm Gonna Rough My Girlfriend's Boyfriend Up Tonight" in April 1980, before they morphed into Department S, taking their name from the ATV television spy-fi series of the same name. In December 1980, the band released the single "Is Vic There?", which subsequently peaked at No. 22 on the UK Singles Chart in April 1981. In 1981, he appeared as a guest vocalist with The Jam at several venues in the UK for the Campaign for Nuclear Disarmament.

Following the dissolution of Department S in 1982, Toulouse later worked as a DJ under the name Main T, and in 1983, released the single "Fickle Public Speaking" as the Main T Possee. Written and produced by Paul Weller, the song made No. 89 on the UK Singles Chart. In 1982, he appeared on the cover of The Jam's single "The Bitterest Pill (I Ever Had to Swallow)". Toulouse participated in The Style Council's miners' charity project the Council Collective, appearing on the "Soul Deep" single (1984) and then recorded a solo single, "Cruisin' the Serpentine" (1985).

Toulouse was openly gay. He died in 1991 from an AIDS-related illness, aged 32.
