= Hammer Records =

- Founder: Des Dolan
- Status: Defunct
- Distributor: Pye
- Genre: Various
- Country of origin: London, England
- Location: 35/37 Wardour Street, London Wl

Hammer Records was a record label located in London, England. It was formed in 1979 and released records until the 1980s.

== Background ==
Hammer Records was an independent record label. The label's records were distributed by Pye. The directors of the company were Des Dolan and Simon Cohen. Simon Cohen previously was the director of the Psycho label, founded in the late 1970s which had Limme, Clem Curtis & The Foundations, Mac Kissoon, and The Majors on their books.

The point of contact for the label was at PO Box 4BT, 35/37 Wardour Street, London Wl.

The first direct signing for the label was the American rockabilly band, Hank Mizell & The Rock N Rhythm Boys. The label also released records from the rock & roll era which included, The King Speaks by Elvis Presley, Giants of Rock & Roll by Chuck Berry and Fats Domino (HMR 9007), and the various artists compilation, They Sold A Million (HMR 9010).

== History ==
=== 1979 ===
It was reported by music trade magazine Music Week in the magazine's June 30, 1979 issue that record producer Des Dolan was launching the Hammer Record label in July that year. The directors Des Dolan and Simon Cohen had already signed a two-year distribution deal with the Pye record label. They already had three releases line up. They were The Many Sides Of Mike 'Stand' Douglas by Mike 'Stand' Douglas, Golden Greats by Fats Domino and Golden Greats by Chuck Berry. Their first single was "Roll This and That" by The Mumps on Rock, a New York new wave band.

That year, Stavely Makepeace had their Rob Woodward produced single "Songs of Yesterday" bw "Storm" released on Hammer HS 304.

The September 15 issue of Music Week Reported that Hammer had picked up on two Everest Records productions, a Johnny Cash self-titled album, released on HMB 7001, and Jerry Lee Lewis self-titled album, released on Hammer HMB 7002. It was also reported in the same issue that Hammer had an early Mary O'Hara album in the new releases. On the way was an early Bob Marley & the Wailers LP that had been licensed from Beverley's Records in Jamaica, and an Elvis Presley record that had been recorded at a 1961 press conference. In the same issue, it was also reported in Dooley's Diary that Hank Mizell was to sign a long-term contract with the label.

In October, 1979, by arrangement with Hammer Records, a Patrick Doolan produced single "Standing Waiting" bw "Women" by Yancey was released on Octane HS 302.

A DJ who had purchased two records by The Platters and Bobby Vee which were six track maxi singles voiced dissatisfaction with them which appeared in the Opinion section of the October 13 issue of Music Week. The claim was that they sounded so different from the originals the DJ had in their possession. The suggestion was that the sleeve should say if they were re-recordings or not. There was a follow up on this in the October 27 issue of the magazine by DJ Dave White of Dynamite Disco in Whitton, Middlesex. In his opinion the Hammer series was superb, and the records in the series that went down the best were the Johnny and the Hurricanes and Jerry Lee Lewis releases. He said, "For us, it is satisfying and sufficient just to be able to dance to the records. So in one or two cases they are not the original recordings — so what?"

It was announced in the December 8, 1979 issue of Music Week that Hammer Records have moved to 35/37 Wardour Street, London W1.

=== 1980s ===
Looking for new talent in 1980, the label already had Hank Mizell, a US rockabilly artist in the fold. According to the January 26, 1980 issue of Music Week, he was busy writing and rehearsing new material for his first release. Director Des Dolan was looking for artists in the rock, pop and soul genres who wrote their own material who looked exciting and gigged regularly. They were also open to one off deals for singles and albums.

It was reported by Music Week in the magazine's March 8, 1980 issue that MD Des Dolan had returned from the US the previous week where he had been in several conferences with R & R labels. There was talk of high pre-release orders for a Fats Domino / Chuck Berry album, Giants Of Rock & Roll which was to be released on April 11.

It was reported in the April 26, 1980 issue of Music Week that Denny Laine, the former Wings guitarist was releasing his first solo record. The song, "Japanese Tears" was being released on the Scratch Records label on April 2 and due to an arrangement with Hammer, the record was being distributed through Pye records.

As per the May 19, 1980 issue of Music Week, the Deptford r&b band Rubber Johnny had been signed to Hammer Records. They were to release a single in June and an album in September.
