= Department S (band) =

British post-punk/new wave band

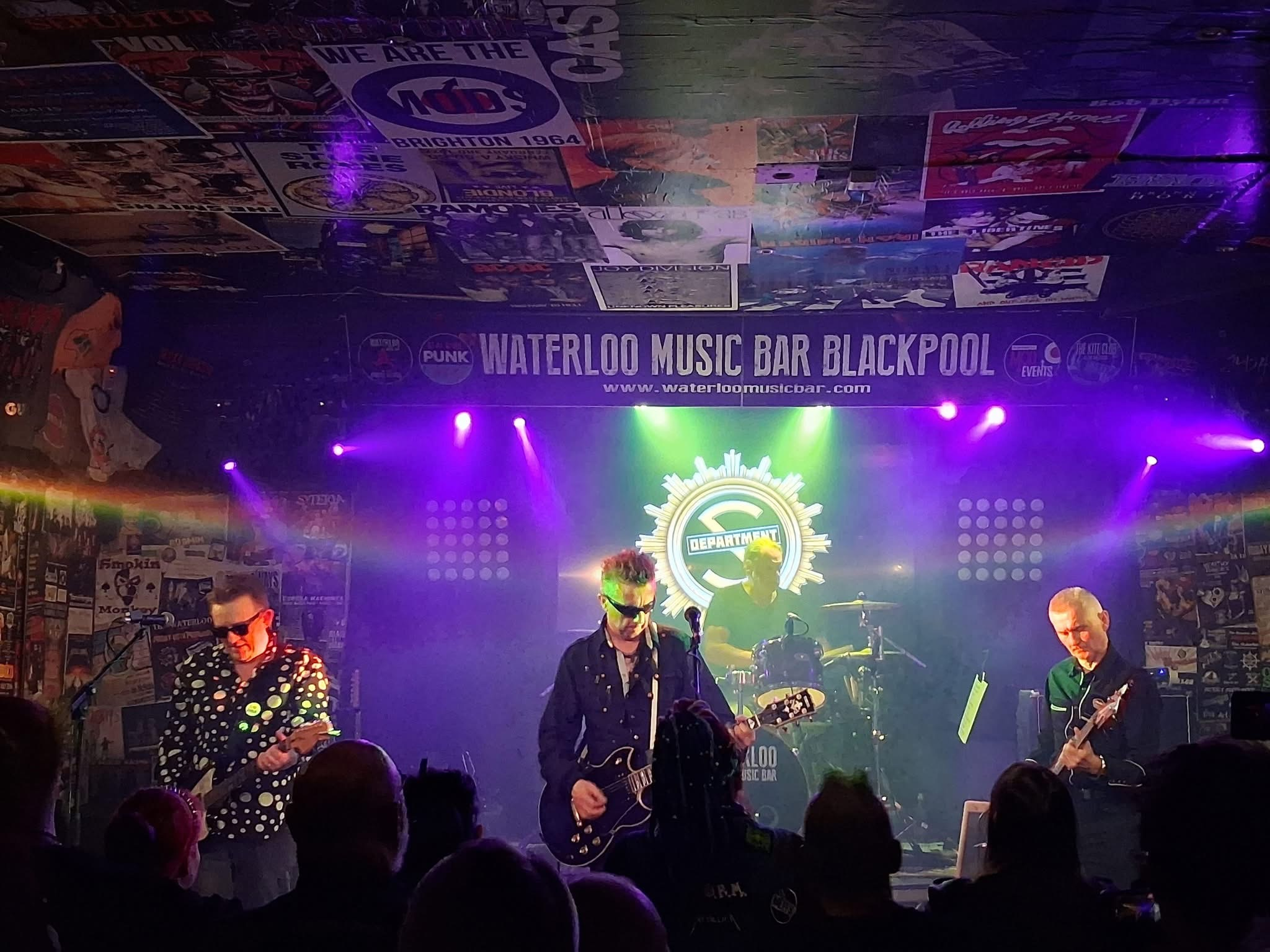
- Department S in 2026

Background information
- Origin: United Kingdom
- Genres: Post-punk, new wave
- Years active: 1980–1982; 2007–present
- Labels: Demon, RCA, Stiff, LTM, Sartorial, J.A.M. UK, Westworld Recordings
- Members: Phil Thompson; Mike Lea; Mark Whiteside; Mark Couperthwaite
- Past members: Eddie Roxy; Mike Herbage; Vaughn Toulouse; Tony Lordan; Stuart Mizon; Mark Taylor; Jimmy Hughes; Sam Burnett; Alexander Lutes; Pete Jones; Alan Galax; Simon Bowley
- Website: https://www.department-s.co.uk/

Department S are a British post-punk/new wave band formed in 1980, who took their name from the 1960s TV series Department S. They are best known for their debut single, "Is Vic There?", which was originally released in December 1980 and reached No. 22 on the UK Singles Chart the following year.

== History ==
=== 1980s ===
Department S evolved from a previous punk/ska combo, Guns for Hire, fronted by Vaughn Toulouse and also featuring former Madness drummer John Hasler. Mike Herbage joined them on guitar and wrote Guns for Hire's only single, "I'm Gonna Rough My Girlfriend's Boyfriend Up Tonight", released on the Korova record label. The group then became Department S with the addition of bassist Tony Lordan, drummer Stuart Mizon and keyboardist Eddie Roxy (born Anthony Edward Lloyd-Barnes), taking their name from the British spy-fi adventure television series Department S, produced by ITC Entertainment.

They debuted at the Rock Garden in London on 24 September 1980. Demon Records released their debut single, "Is Vic There?", in December 1980. It was produced by former Mott the Hoople members Buffin and Overend Watts. The B-side, a cover version of T.Rex's "Solid Gold Easy Action", featured Thunderthighs on backing vocals.

"Is Vic There?" began to climb the UK Singles Chart, reaching No. 22. The single's initial success led to the better-equipped RCA Records reissuing the single in March 1981. This edition, featuring a remix by David Tickle, reached No. 67 on the Hot Dance Club Play chart, and the band appeared on Top of the Pops.

Department S defied easy categorisation, but recorded a session for John Peel on 3 December 1980. The tracks featured were "Is Vic There?", "Age Concern", "Ode to Cologne (Stench of War)" and "Clap Now".

In early 1981, Roxy was replaced by Mark Taylor. The band's second single, "Going Left Right", was issued on 19 June 1981 on Stiff Records (after the label had rejected "Clap Now") and failed to chart as high, although it received positive reviews. Stiff also released "Is Vic There?" in the US.

Department S began recording a debut album, Sub-Stance, in 1981 with Tickle producing, but the sessions were divisive and Lordan left, replaced partway through by Jimmy Hughes (formerly of the Banned, Cowboys International and Original Mirrors). A third single, "I Want", was released by Stiff in November 1981. Modest sales as well as differences of opinion with the label resulted in the band being dropped by Stiff, but not before £50,000 was reputedly spent on the unreleased album, which Stiff refused to part with.

After a London concert on 18 March 1982, Herbage left, and the band split several months later.

Toulouse later worked as a DJ under the name the Main T, and in 1983, as the Main T Possee, he released the single "Fickle Public Speaking" which reached No. 89 on the UK chart. He recorded as part of the Style Council's 1984 miners' charity project the Council Collective, and released a solo single, "Cruisin' the Serpentine", in 1985. He died in 1991 from an AIDS-related illness, aged 32.

The tracks from Sub-Stance were first officially released by Mau Mau Records in 1993 as the compilation album Vic There?, which also included several B-sides. The album was finally issued under its correct title in 2002 by LTM, with several B-sides and live tracks appended.

=== Revival ===
In February 2007, a reunited Department S (guitarist Herbage, drummer Mizon and former keyboardist Roxy, now on vocals) recorded their first new single in 26 years, a cover version of Alvin Stardust's 1973 hit "My Coo-Ca-Choo", with guest musicians Mark Bedford of Madness on bass, Terry Edwards on brass and Michelle Brigandage on backing vocals. It was released on Sartorial Records in October. Several other new tracks were recorded at that time, including "Wonderful Day" (which included guest contributions from Edwards, Glen Matlock and Marco Pirroni) and "God Squad Saviour" (with John Keeble of Spandau Ballet guesting on drums).

In August 2008, Mizon left the band due to family commitments, but returned to the fold in early 2009. In June 2009, former keyboardist Taylor rejoined the band on bass. Guitarist/songwriter Sam Burnett (ex-Back to Zero) also joined on a full-time basis.

The "Wonderful Day" EP was released by Sartorial in August 2009. In February 2010, the band made their live comeback at London's 100 Club, with more gigs undertaken throughout 2010, including appearances at the Rebellion Festival and Sinners Day Festival in Belgium.

The "God Squad Saviour" single was released in June 2011, followed by the album Mr Nutley's Strange Delusionarium (mainly consisting of remakes of older material) on 3 October, both issued by Sartorial. The band played at the Hertals Rocks Festival in Belgium in October 2011, and at the 2012 Festival Internacional de Benicàssim in Spain.

In April 2014, Pete Jones (formerly of Public Image Ltd, Cowboys International and Brian Brain) joined on bass guitar. In 2015, original drummer Mizon, original guitarist Herbage and guitarist Burnett all left the band and were replaced by drummer Alexander Lutes and guitarist Phil Thompson. A digital single, "On My Own (Again)", was released in 2015 by J.A.M. UK.

A new Department S full-length album, When All Is Said and All Is Done, produced by Jones, was released by Westworld Recordings on 27 May 2016. In 2017, Alan Galaxy replaced Lutes on drums.

In 2017, the band released the 45 Revolutions: Singles 1980 – 2017 compilation on Westworld.

The band (belatedly, due to the COVID-19 pandemic) celebrated the 40th Anniversary of the release of "Is Vic There?" in 2022 with a re-recorded version which was released as a ruby vinyl 7inch single, limited to 500 copies worldwide. The new version reached number 2 in the Heritage Chart.

In 2022 Department S consisted of Phil Thompson (lead vocals and guitar), Mike Lea (bass and backing vocals) and Simon Bowley (drums and backing vocals.) Their most recent single "Burn Down Tomorrow", the title track of the forthcoming studio album, was released in September 2022.

From 2025 Department S consists of Phil Thompson (lead vocals and guitar), Mike Lea (bass and backing vocals), Mark Couperthwaite (guitar and backing vocals), and Mark Whiteside (drums).

== Discography ==
=== Studio albums ===
Year	Albums	Label	Notes
2003	Sub-Stance	LTM	1981 album plus live and demo tracks
2011	Mr Nutleys Strange Delusionarium	Sartorial	
2016	When All Is Said and All Is Done	Westworld Recordings	
2024	Burn Down Tomorrow	Last Night From Glasgow	

=== Singles ===
Year	Singles	UK Singles Chart	US Hot Dance Club Play	Heritage Chart	Label	Notes
1980	"I'm Gonna Rough My Girlfriend's Boyfriend Up Tonight"				Korova	Band then billed as Guns for Hire
1980	"Is Vic There?"	No. 22			Demon, RCA	B-side; "Solid Gold Easy Action"
1981	"Is Vic There? (Re-mixed Version)"		No. 67		Stiff	B-side; "Put All the Crosses in the Right Boxes"
1981	"Going Left Right"	No. 55			Stiff	B-side; "She's Expecting You"
1981	"I Want"				Stiff	B-side; "Monte Carlo or Bust" + "Put All the Crosses in the Right Boxes"
2007	"My Coo-Ca-Choo"				Sartorial	
2011	"God Squad Saviour"				Sartorial	B-side; "Slave"
2015	"On My Own (Again)"				J.A.M. UK	
2016	"When All Is Said and All Is Done"				Westworld Recordings	
2017	"I Believe"				Westworld Recordings	
2022	"Is Vic There?" 40th Anniversary Version			No.2	Cadiz Music	

=== EPs ===
Year	EPs	Label
2009	Wonderful Day	Sartorial

=== Compilation albums ===
Year	Albums	Label
1993	Is Vic There?	Mau Mau Records
2017	45 Revolutions: Singles 1980 – 2017	Westworld Records

== Members ==
Current

- Phil Thompson – guitar, vocals (2015–present)
- Simon Bowley- drums, backing vocals
- Mike Lea – bass, backing vocals

Former

- Vaughn Toulouse (born Vaughn Cotillard, 30 July 1959, St Helier, Jersey, Channel Islands; died August 1991) – vocals (1980–1982)
- Mike Herbage – guitar (1980–1982, 2007–2015)
- Tony Lordan – bass (1980–1982)
- Stuart Mizon – drums (1980–1982, 2007–2015)
- Mark Taylor – keyboards (1981–1982), bass 2009–2014)
- Jimmy Hughes – bass (1981–1982)
- Sam Burnett – guitar (2011–2015)
- Alexander Lutes – drums (2015–2017)
- Pete Jones – bass, backing vocals (2014–2019)
- Alan Galaxy (born Glenn Morton) – drums (2017–2019)
- Eddie Roxy – vocals

== See also ==
- List of performers on Top of the Pops
- List of new wave artists
