= Paul Simon (drummer) =

- Also known as: (The other) Paul Simon
- Born: 1956 (age 69–70); Halifax, West Yorkshire, England
- Genres: New wave; post-punk; punk rock; world music
- Occupation: Musician
- Instrument: Drums
- Years active: 1970s–present

Paul Simon (born 1950 in Halifax, West Yorkshire,) is an English drummer who played with different punk and new wave artists including Ian North, Radio Stars, John Foxx and Glen Matlock. He is the brother of Robin, Ultravox and Magazine guitarist, with whom formed Ajanta Music, an experimental band, in the 1990s.

== Biography ==
Being an organizer of the Halifax Arts Lab, in Halifax, he played with his younger brother Robin, in the 1970s in different bands of the area, and one of them included Billy Currie, later Ultravox. Later, he and Robert played in Limmie Snell's Limmie Funk Limited, touring England. In 1976, he was introduced to Ian North and the pair formed Radio, later Neo.

Between early and mid 1977, while playing gigs with Neo, he joined Radio Stars, with former Radio's bandmate Martin Gordon, and recorded the "Good Personality" 7" single and some songs which were released in their Radio Stars Somewhere There's A Place For Us (1992); the time of his two bands were very full, dropping out from Radio Stars, who were preparing for a Japanese tour, while Neo had to do a gig at Marquee Club, being leal to North and his brother, rejoining for full-time with the latters, although Gordon and company asked him to tour in Japan. That line-up in Neo continued until February/March 1978, when his brother Robert decided to quit and join Ultravox, so Paul was sacked by North shortly afterwards.

After Neo, he integrated a number of bands in the late 1970s and early 1980s. By 1979, he formed part of The Civilians, where began to team up with Trevor Herion; in 1980 joined Cowboys International, replacing ex-The Clash Terry Chimes, recording some songs and doing the last tour before the split of that band; later, he was briefly in Girls At Our Best, recording their single "Politics!" / "It's Fashion" (November, 1980); later he and Herion dissolved The Civilians and formed The Fallout Club, with Thomas Dolby, releasing a number of singles, in 1981. By the time he collaborated with his ex-Cowboys International bandmate, singer Ken Lockie in his album The Impossible (1981), Glen Matlock's The Mavericks and The Philistines as member, and with John Foxx and Sue Rachel as collaborator.
