= The Fallout Club =

British band

The Fallout Club was a British synth-pop and new wave band formed by Irish singer Trevor Herion, the experimental drummer Paul Simon, future successful Thomas Dolby on keyboards, and bassist Matthew Seligman in 1981. Herion and Simon formed the band shortly after the demise of their previous group, the Civilians, while Dolby was in Bruce Woolley and the Camera Club Seligman, who also had played in the Soft Boys.

The band only released singles: "Falling Years"/"The Beat Boys", "Dream Soldiers", "Pedestrian Walkway", "Wonderlust"/"Desert Song" (Happy Birthday Records, 1981). The group was short-lived and split-up shortly afterwards. Dolby went successfully solo, Simon went to work with Glen Matlock, Seligman joined Thompson Twins (who counted with a brief collaboration with Dolby), and Herion also pursued a solo but failed to get hits before releasing his Beauty Life album in 1983, and died in 1988.

== Discography ==
- "Falling Years" b/w "The Beat Boys" 7" single on Secret Records (1980)
- "Dream Soldiers" b/w "Pedestrian Walkway" 7" single on Happy Birthday Records (May 1981)
- "Wonderlust" b/w "Desert Song" 7" single on Happy Birthday Records (October 1981)
- "Wonderlust (Extended)" b/w "Desert Song (Extended)" 12" single on Happy Birthday Records (October 1981)
