= Ian North =

American singer (1952–2021)

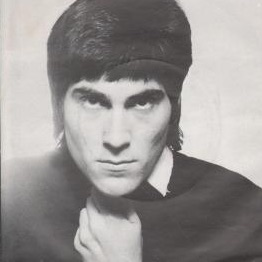

Background information
- Born: March 24, 1952; Brooklyn, New York, United States
- Origin: New York City, United States
- Died: February 28, 2021 (aged 68)
- Genres: Punk rock, protopunk, hard rock, new wave, synthpop, electronica
- Occupations: Musician, producer, painter
- Instruments: Vocals, guitar, bass guitar
- Years active: 1971–2021
- Labels: Island Records, Polydor, Jet Records, Aura Records, Cherry Red

Ian North (March 24, 1952 – February 28, 2021) was an American musician, producer, and painter known for being part of the New York punk scene with his power pop band Milk 'N' Cookies.

== Early life and career ==
Ian North was born in Brooklyn, New York, United States. During his adolescence, North wrote his own stories set in The Twilight Zone and experimented with mixed media art. He was the co-editor if his high school's literary magazine. He grew up in Long Island. He received his first guitar at age 12, but being virtually tone deaf, could not play any songs other than those he composed.

=== Milk 'N' Cookies ===
In 1973, North formed a power pop and glam outfit called Milk 'N' Cookies along with Justin Strauss on vocals, Jay Weiss (replaced by Sal Maida, later in Roxy Music and Sparks) on bass and Mike Ruiz on drums (later in Paul Collins' Beat). The band began recording their only album in 1974. Their self-titled LP was released in 1976 to capitalize on the punk movement; it eventually became a cult-classic.

After its reissue in 2005, the band headlined the Radio Heartbeat festival in 2007 without North. As younger bands that now claim Milk 'n' Cookies as an influence have gained in popularity, like Nobunny and Cheap Time, the band has garnered even more attention. In 2016, Captured Tracks released a 3xLP Milk 'N' Cookies boxset which included a book of liners featuring notes by members of Sonic Youth, Ramones, and Blondie.

=== British punk and new wave scene: Radio and Neo ===
After the split of Milk 'N' Cookies, Island Records offered North a solo contract if he moved to London. There, he formed Radio with Sparks bassist Martin Gordon and the brothers, Paul, drums and Robin, Simon, guitar. That group transformed into Neo after Gordon's departure (he joined Radio Stars) and changed line-ups; North was the only remaining member until 1979. When his visa ended and he returned to New York. The same year, twelve Neo tracks were released in Britain by Aura Records as a North solo album, titled Neo.

=== Return to US and solo career ===
Back in New York, North took to newly affordable synth technology and recording equipment, first on his debut full-length album as a solo artist, My Girlfriend's Dead on Cachalot Records, and then on his Rape of the Orchids EP. During this time he also produced material for The Fast. He also filled in as the band's bassist in the music videos for their songs "Kids Just Wanna Dance" and "Love Me Like a Locomotive". From 1983 to 1993, North worked sporadically on the album Torch Songs & Arson. While the label originally slated to release the album folded in the decade over which it was created, it has since been made available for free download. In 2009, North ended the longest period of musical inactivity in his life, releasing the 12-song album, E Z Listening For Suicides, under the moniker "Darkjet".

== Art ==
North exhibited his art in Frebruary 2021 in Sarasota, Florida at SPAACES. Speaking about the show, North explained, "I promised myself I would never try to sell my work. I would do it to entertain myself... But this was a fantastic opportunity to put a lot of it together and have it be seen by people." His art is described as "collage and mixed media assemblage."

== Death ==
North died in Sarasota, FL following complications from a heart attack on February 28, 2021. He is survived by his wife of 20 years, Mooshi Chapel and four children, including artist Sammy thrashLife.

== Discography ==
=== Albums ===
- Neo (1979)
- Ian North [EP] (1980)
- My Girlfriend’s Dead (1980)
- Rape of Orchids (1982)

=== Singles ===
- Hollywood Babylon / No Sound From 25 (1980)
- Rape of Orchids (1982)
- E.P. (1982)
- Pretty Pretty (1984)
- Techno-Kill (1989)

== See also ==
- Milk 'N' Cookies
- Neo
