= Is Vic There? =

Single by Department S
- A-side: "Is Vic There?"
- B-side: "Solid Gold Easy Action"
- Released: 29 December 1980
- Genre: Post-punk, indie rock
- Label: Demon Records, RCA Records, Stiff Records
- Songwriters: Mike Herbage, Vaughn Toulouse
- Producer: Dale Griffin/Overend Watts

Department S singles chronology
"I'm Gonna Rough My Girlfriend's Boyfriend Up Tonight" (1980)	"Is Vic There?" (1980)	"Is Vic There? (Re-mixed Version)" (1981)

"Is Vic There?" is a song by post-punk band Department S, released by Demon Records on 29 December 1980. It was their first single under the name Department S, after their debut single "I'm Gonna Rough My Girlfriend's Boyfriend Up Tonight" under the name Guns for Hire.

It was produced by former Mott the Hoople members Buffin and Overend Watts. The title is a quotation from a Monty Python sketch titled "Phone-In", which closed the comedy troupe's 1973 Matching Tie and Handkerchief album.

== Release ==
"Is Vic There?" charted at No. 22 on the UK Singles Chart and, when re-released on RCA Records in March 1981, it made No. 67 on the Hot Dance Club Play chart.

The Demon and RCA UK B-side was a cover of T.Rex's "Solid Gold Easy Action", featuring Thunderthighs on backing vocals.

A 1981 release of the single in the US by Stiff Records featured a different B-side, "Put All the Crosses in the Right Boxes", as did a remixed edition of the song released that year by Stiff as a single in Europe.

== Charts ==
Chart (1980)	Peak position
UK Singles (OCC)	22
US Dance Club Songs (Billboard)	67
