= Milk 'N' Cookies =

American power pop band

- Origin: Long Island, New York, U.S.
- Genre: Power pop
- Years active: 1973–1977, 2005–2008
- Labels: Island, Captured Tracks, RPM, Radio Heartbeat
- Past members: Ian North; Mike Ruiz; Justin Strauss; Jay Weiss; Sal Maida

Milk 'N' Cookies was an American power pop band from Long Island, New York. Formed in 1973, the band was short-lived, with their wholesome-yet-subversive and pop-based sound standing out in the early CBGB New York punk rock scene. This has led to them later being regarded as forerunners to the new wave movement.

On February 28, 2021, Ian North died at the age of 68 from complications following a heart attack. Sal Maida died due to complications of a fall in New York, on February 1, 2025, at the age of 76.

== History ==
Milk 'N' Cookies was formed in early 1973, when Ian North, an aspiring artist and singer/guitarist from Woodmere, New York, met the guitarist Jay Weiss, who—despite being the better guitarist of the two—opted to switch instruments when the band was unable to find a bassist. The two became best friends and, after recruiting drummer Mike Ruiz, began shopping a demo tape North recorded on a four-track TEAC. At the band's first show as Milk 'n' Cookies, eventual lead singer, Justin Strauss, shook a tambourine and sang back-ups. "After the show a few people told me it didn't look right," North noted, "either he should be the lead singer or he should get off the stage." North relinquished lead vocals and Strauss's position was cemented.

Milk 'N' Cookies quickly found an audience, playing at Long Island and New York bars, clubs, high school dances, and in 1974, for Sparks' manager, John Hewlett. Hewlett agreed to take the band on, and later played an instrumental role in flying the band to England to record with producer Muff Winwood, but only upon the condition that Weiss be replaced by Sal Maida, a bassist who had previously played with Roxy Music. Without hesitation, North dismissed Weiss from the group. Decades later, he would write that "the guilt of that has weighed on my conscience ever since."

The first single from the album, "Little, Lost And Innocent" backed with "Good Friends", was released by Island Records, but when it failed to chart and the label could not figure out how to market the band, the album's release was indefinitely postponed. When Island offered Ian North a solo deal, he left Milk 'N' Cookies and moved to London, forming a new group called Ian's Radio, which eventually became Neo. By this time, Sal Maida had quit the group as well, to play with Sparks.

By the late 1970s, the rise of punk rock and new wave in the UK, prompted Island Records to reverse its decision and release the band’s debut album. However, due to poor promotion, the record sold poorly, and the label shifted its attention toward songwriter North rather than the band as a whole. Their image was that of "well-scrubbed all-American boys who would not have looked out of place in the pages of a vintage Tiger Beat." They were later described as being early to the new wave movement, with their sound standing out in the early New York punk scene, which contributed to their early disbanding.

North who up to this point had written all of the band's music and lyrics, went on to form the band Ian's North Radio and launched a solo career, the remaining members of Milk 'n' Cookies recorded a few more demos, but no further material was released.

== Reunion ==
2005 marked the start of a period of renewed interest in Milk 'N' Cookies. That year the band reunited to play the Radio Heartbeat Power Pop Fest in Brooklyn. The performance coincided with a reissue of their singular album by RPM Records, who also reissued solo material from Ian North's post–Milk 'N' Cookies period. North, however, was not present for the reunion set or any ancillary press or promotional events.

In 2008, Radio Heartbeat reissued the album yet again.

On January 24, 2016, Captured Tracks released a three-album box set, including the band's original album, two LPs of rare unreleased demos, and a 100-page hardcover book with liners by members of Sonic Youth, Talking Heads, Ramones, Milk 'N' Cookies, and others. However, the book does not include any contributions from North, the band's songwriter, lyricist, lead guitarist, and co-founder. North took to his blog to share his memories of the band's formation and trajectory, and to correct several points he felt were important to the band's history.

Primarily, North lamented the limited consideration given to founding member Jay Weiss, who he credited not only with the band's name, but as being the first person to take him seriously as a musician. "Without Jay," North writes, "I would never have been able to put together a band to play my songs." While the reissue gives little credit to Weiss's contributions, it does credit him as the guitarist on the demo recordings. According to North, however, North was the one playing guitar on those tracks. "Jay was much better than that," he notes, "and I recognize my own guitar playing when I hear it."

== Deaths ==
On February 28, 2021, Ian North died at the age of 68 from complications following a heart attack. Sal Maida died due to complications of a fall in New York, on February 1, 2025, at the age of 76.

== Discography ==
- Milk 'N' Cookies LP (Island Records)
- Milk 'N' Cookies Triple LP (Captured Tracks)
