= Cowboys International =

New wave and synth-pop band

- Origin: England
- Genres: New wave, synthpop
- Years active: 1979–1980; 2003–present
- Labels: Virgin, Pnuma
- Members: Ken Lockie
- Past members: Keith Levene; Evan Charles; Terry Chimes; Rick Jacks; Jimmy Hughes; Allan Rawlings; Marco Pirroni; Paul Simon; Lee Robinson; Stevie Shears; Pete Jones; Rob Doyle

Cowboys International (also stylised as Cowboys International®) were a new wave and synthpop band formed by vocalist and songwriter Ken Lockie that put out one album in 1979, The Original Sin, and a few singles before dissolving in 1980.

== History ==
In the late 1970s, Ken Lockie and Keith Levene were in a band called The Quick Spurts. Changing their name to Cowboys International, the members were Lockie on lead vocals, Rick Jacks on guitar, Jimmy Hughes (formerly of The Banned) on bass, Evan Charles on piano, and ex-Clash Terry Chimes on drums. This line-up, with a little help from Levene (who was in Public Image Ltd) recorded and released The Original Sin album in 1979.

After the releasing of the album and a tour, the band suffered important line-up changes: Chimes (who joined Billy Idol's Generation X) was replaced by Paul Simon (previously in Neo, Radio Stars and The Civilians); Jacks by Allan Rawlings and Marco Pirroni (Adam and the Ants member), who recorded some material in 1980 with the band, but they were replaced by ex-Ultravox Steve Shears; and Hughes (who joined Original Mirrors) by Lee Robinson of Boney M fame but later replaced by Pete Jones shortly afterwards; the last band alineation (Lockie, Charles, Jones, Simon and Shears) did the last band tour, which ended at the Kantkino Theatre in Berlin. The band split up in late 1980.

After the dissolving of the band, Lockie pursued a solo career, with collaborations of other former members, Simon and Shears, then other musicians who played in different bands with trajectory. Also by this time, and along with Pete Jones, he joined Public Image Ltd, reuniting with Keith Levene but his membership was brief, dedicating to producing music, but retired in the mid-1980s. Simon formed The Fallout Club, worked with John Foxx and Glen Matlock, and he now works with his brother Robin in AjantaMusic. Shears formed Faith Global, and later retired from the music business. Charles' whereabouts are unknown.

In 2003, Lockie reissued the original album along with non-album material and alternate mixes on the compilation album Revisited. He also revived Cowboys International, and began to work on more original material on The Backwards Life of Romeo, which was released in 2004.

== Discography ==
=== Studio albums ===
- The Original Sin (1979)
- The Backwards Life of Romeo (2004)

=== Compilations ===
- Revisited (2003)

=== Singles ===
- "Thrash" (b/w "Many Times (Revised)") (1979)
- "Aftermath" (b/w "Future Noise") (1979)
- "Nothing Doing" (b/w "Millions", flexi "Many Times") (Virgin, 1979)
- "Today Today" (b/w "Fixation") (February 1980)

== Legacy ==
The song "Wish" from The Original Sin was an inspiration for the song "You Ain't Got Me" by French cyberpunk band Punish Yourself as stated on the sleeve notes of their Pink Panther Party album.
