= The Banned =

English band

- Origin: Croydon, London, England
- Genres: Power Pop Bubblegum music Punk rock Novelty song new wave garage rock
- Years active: 1977–1978, 2009
- Labels: Harvest
- Past members: Paul Sordid; Pete Fresh; John Thomas; Rick Mansworth; Ben Dover; Tommy Steal; David Owen Smith

The Banned were an English Power Pop punk/new wave band active in the late 1970s.

== History ==
The Banned had a minor UK hit in 1977 with "Little Girl", a cover version of a 1966 U.S. hit song by the Syndicate of Sound. The Banned's original home pressing on Can't Eat Records (Eat Up 1) was taken up by EMI's Harvest label. The Banned originated from Tooting and Camberwell in London.

Originally the Banned were:

- Paul Sordid – Drums/vocals (real name Paul Aitken)
- John Thomas – Bass (real name Jonathan Davie)
- Rik Mansworth – Guitar/vocals (real name Richard Harvey)
- Pete Fresh – Guitar/vocals (real name Pete Airey)

Harvey and Davie had previously been members of the progressive rock/folk band, Gryphon. Aitken had been a member of Precious Little. They recorded "Little Girl" in an attempt to take advantage of the popularity of punk rock, or in Aitken's words to "work a scam to do this punk thing". The line-up changed in the first few months with Tommy Steal (real name Jimmy Hughes) replacing Davie on bass and Ben Dover (Ben Grove) replacing Harvey on guitar. This line-up recorded the second single "Him or Me" with "You Dirty Rat" on the B-side. For their Top of the Pops performance of "Little Girl" in December 1977, Sordid, Fresh and Steal were joined by Sugar Kane (real name David Owen Smith) on 12 string guitar.

Due to management problems the band folded six months later, but Aitken and Grove continued working together in a band called The Retros. Paul Sordid appeared on Never Mind The Buzzcocks in 2004. Jimmy Hughes joined Ken Lockie and Keith Levene's electronic pop band Cowboys International.

The Banned reformed in 2009 and played at the 12 Bar Club in London, and the Rebellion Festival in Blackpool.

The track "Little Girl" is on a number of compilation albums – notably The Best Punk Album in The World Ever 2, Totally Sensational 70s, and Rare Stuff. A historical CD of their recordings was released by Cherry Red Records in 2004, including tracks by Precious Little and The Retros.

With only one single making the UK Singles Chart (No. 36 in December 1977 for "Little Girl"), the Banned join the list of one-hit wonders; a list that includes other UK punk rock, pub rock, or new wave acts such as John Cooper Clarke, The Fruit Eating Bears, Jilted John, 999, the Radio Stars, the Rich Kids and The Vibrators.

== Discography ==
=== Albums ===
- Little Girl (2004), Cherry Red

=== Singles ===
- "Little Girl" / "C.P.G.J.'s" (1977), Can't Eat – reissued on Harvest Records, UK No. 36
- "Him or Me" / "You Dirty Rat" (1978), Harvest
