= Limmie & Family Cookin' =

American family soul group

- Origin: Canton, Ohio, United States
- Genres: Pop, R&B, soul
- Years active: 1972–1986
- Labels: Avco Records, Philips Records
- Past members: Limmie Snell; Jimmie Snell; Martha Snell

Limmie & Family Cookin' was an American family soul and pop group from Canton, Ohio.

== Background ==
Although Limmie Snell was born in Dalton, Alabama, his family moved to Canton when he was very young. He recorded with Columbia Records from age 11 as a solo artist before joining his sisters, Jimmie and Martha, to form the Limmie & Family Cookin'. They released one single on Scepter Records, then signed with Avco Embassy, where they released three singles which hit the UK Singles Chart in 1973–74: "You Can Do Magic" (UK No. 3), "Dreamboat" (UK No. 31), and "A Walkin' Miracle" (UK No. 6). The last of them was a cover version of a song by The Essex. Despite their success in the United Kingdom, they dented the US charts only once, with "You Can Do Magic" (No. 84 on the Billboard Hot 100 and No. 42 on the Billboard R&B chart). Their releases were primarily produced by Sandy Linzer and Steve Metz.

Because of their popularity in the UK, they continued performing there regularly into the 1980s. They split into two musical ensembles, the second of which was formed in 1976 under the name Limmie Funk Limited. Its line-up consisted of Limmie on vocals, Nick Straker aka Nick Bailey on keyboards, Pete Hammond on bass guitar, Gary Andrews on percussion, Andy Gierus on guitar and Phil Towner on drums.

Limmie Snell died on May 27, 1986, at age 37.

Jimmie Snell (born December 11, 1946, in Newton, Alabama), died on March 12, 2016, at age 69.

== Career ==
=== "You Can Do Magic" ===
"You Can Do Magic" was the biggest of three hit singles Limmie & Family Cookin' had in the UK charts in the 1970s. In 1997, the track was covered by Mike Stock under the name The Mojams, for an investigation on ITV programme The Cook Report into chart rigging. Fronted by Edwina Currie's daughter Debbie (then a trainee journalist for the production company Central Television), the single, credited to The Mojams featuring Debbie Currie, was released by Gotham Records and peaked at number 86 in the UK singles chart.

=== Further activities ===
It was reported in the 14 April 1973 issue of Record World that Limmie and the Family Cookin' had been signed up to Three Star Management, Inc., a company headed by Steve Metz, Bob Bregman and Mike Lefferts. This happened in conjunction with Allan Klein of Cleveland.

== Discography ==
=== Singles ===
Year	Title	Peak chart positions		
Year	Title	US Pop	US R&B	UK
1972	"You Can Do Magic"	84	42	3
1973	"Made in Heaven"	―	―	―
1973	"Dreamboat"	―	―	31
1974	"A Walkin' Miracle"	―	―	6
1974	"Saxophone Jones"	―	―	―
1975	"Lollipop"	―	―	―
1975	"Hold Me, Thrill Me, Kiss Me"	―	―	―
1977	"I Can Stop (Any Time I Want To)"	―	―	―
1977	"A Little Bit of Soap"	―	―	―
"—" denotes releases that did not chart.

== See also ==
- List of performances on Top of the Pops
