= Neo (British band) =

English-American new wave band

- Origin: London, England
- Genres: Glam punk; punk rock; new wave
- Years active: 1977–1979
- Labels: Jet; Aura
- Past members: Ian North; Paul Simon; Robert Simon; Bryson Graham; Steve Byrd; John McCoy; Steve Wilkin; Nick South; Mik Sweeney; Derek Quinton; Dan Black

Neo was an English-American new wave band which was part of the English musical scene originated by punk in the 1970s. The group was formed by the American-born singer Ian North, who was the frontman and the only continuous member from the band formation in 1977 to the end in 1979.

== History ==
=== Early days: Radio ===
In 1976, Ian North (lead vocals, guitar) travelled with his band Milk 'N' Cookies to London to record an album for Island Records. The record was recorded, but the release delayed, resulting in the group disbanding.

North stayed in London, meeting Brian Eno and Martin Gordon (bass), who a few years previously had founded, with ex-John's Children's Andy Ellison, the glam band Jet. North created a new band called Radio and invited Paul Simon (drums), who formed part of Limmie Funk Limited (with Limmie Snell) to join them and completed the line-up. The band was post-punk, but after only one gig, supporting Ultravox! in November 1976, Gordon dropped out. The band recruited George Dyner to replace Gordon. However, in April 1977, North took his place on bass and continuing singing, and Paul's brother Robert was introduced on guitar.

According to Paul Simon, Radio (now credited as Ian North's Radio) recorded some songs in the studio, which he remastered in 2007. In mid 1977, Paul Simon accompanied Martin Gordon, forming part of Radio Stars and recording with them "Good Personality", a 7-inch single, and other tracks, some of which were eventually released on Radio Stars' compilation Somewhere There's A Place For Us. He was asked to stay with them, but preferred continuing with North in Neo.

=== Neo ===
As a three piece band, Radio immediately transformed to Neo. North became the bassist, and in this way the group continued until February/March 1978, when Robert Simon dropped out and formed part of Ultravox. North sacked Paul Simon, and included session players in his project: ex-ZZebra members, Steve Byrd on guitar and John McCoy on bass, and Bryson Graham on drums. They recorded an album in Ian Gillan's studio, and after Gillan heard them, he hired Byrd and McCoy away from North. Gillan and the ex-Neo musicians formed Gillan. Only Graham stayed with North.

North renewed Neo again with Steve Wilkin (ex-Wired and Masterwitch) on guitar, Nick South on bass and Graham on drums, but shortly afterwards South and Graham were replaced by Mik Sweeney and Derek Quinton, respectively. Dan Black completed the line-up as keyboardist. That line-up toured with Magazine, doing gigs promoting their single "Tran-Sister", released that year.

After changes of line-ups, Neo split up in 1979 because North had to return to the US. Sweeney joined The News and, later, Classix Nouveaux, Steve Wilkin joined Random Hold, Quinton joined Sector 27, with Tom Robinson, and Black formed Psychic TV.

== Discography ==
- Live at the Vortex (songs "Small Lives" and "Tell Me the Truth") (Nems Records, December 1977)
- "Tran-Sister" (7-inch single) (Jet Records, 1978)
- Neo (only as Ian North as artist name) (Aura, 1979)
