= Terry Chimes =

English musician (born 1956)

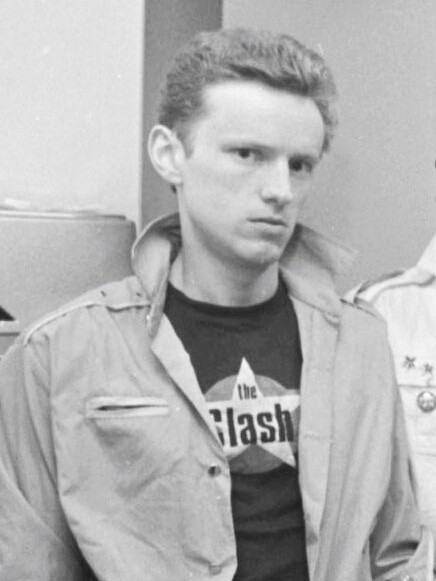
- Chimes in 1982

Background information
- Also known as: Tory Crimes
- Born: Terence Chimes; 5 July 1956 (age 70); Stepney, London, England
- Genres: Punk rock; heavy metal; glam punk; rock and roll
- Occupations: Musician; drummer; chiropractor
- Instruments: Drums; percussion
- Years active: 1975–present
- Website: terrychimes.com

Terence Chimes (born 5 July 1956) is an English musician, best known as the original drummer of punk rock group the Clash. He played with them from July 1976 to November 1976, January 1977 to April 1977, and again from May 1982 to February 1983 both preceding and succeeding his replacement Topper Headon. Chimes also drummed for Generation X from 1980 to 1981, Hanoi Rocks in 1985, and Black Sabbath from 1987 to 1988. In 2003, he was inducted into the Rock and Roll Hall of Fame as a member of The Clash.

== Career ==
=== The Clash ===
Terry Chimes met Mick Jones and Paul Simonon through the local music scene, and would team up with Joe Strummer and Keith Levene to form the Clash.

Both Chimes and Levene subsequently left, but Chimes was brought back to record the band's self-titled debut album, The Clash. On the album sleeve, he was credited as Tory Crimes. After recording the album, Chimes left the band once again and was replaced by Topper Headon.

In 1982, Headon was forced out of the band due to his drug addiction, and Chimes was asked to rejoin. He participated in The Casbah Club tours for both the US and the UK, a brief tour supporting the Who, and the following Combat Rock tour back in the USA. He appeared in the music video for the single, "Rock the Casbah." After the Jamaican World Music Festival of 1982, he left for the third and final time.

=== Other bands ===
After leaving The Clash, Chimes drummed in bands including Johnny Thunders and the Heartbreakers briefly in 1977 and 1984, Cowboys International in 1979, Gen X from 1980 to 1981, Hanoi Rocks in 1985, the Cherry Bombz in 1986 (with ex Hanoi Rocks members Andy McCoy and Nasty Suicide and ex Sham 69/Wanderers/the Lords of the New Church Dave Tregunna) and Black Sabbath on their Eternal Idol Tour in 1987–88. He also played drums with Billy Idol for a period of time.

=== Later years ===
In 2003, he was inducted into the Rock and Roll Hall of Fame as a member of The Clash. At the induction ceremony, he gave an acceptance speech praising Topper Headon's work.

He currently plays drums for the Crunch and the Anita Chellemah Band.

== Personal life ==
Since 1994, Chimes has worked as a chiropractor in Essex at his clinic, Chimes Chiropractic. He also runs chiropractic seminars.

He was nominated as a Scouting in London Ambassador for the Scout Association Region for Greater London at an Adult Appreciation ceremony in 2008.

He served as the chairman of the board for the YMCA of East London from 2002 to 2010.

He is a practising Catholic.

== Bibliography ==
- Gilbert, Pat (2005) [2004]. Passion Is a Fashion: The Real Story of The Clash (4th ed.). London: Aurum Press. ISBN 1-84513-113-4. OCLC 61177239.
- Gray, Marcus (2005) [1995]. The Clash: Return of the Last Gang in Town (5th revised ed.). London: Helter Skelter. ISBN 1-905139-10-1. OCLC 60668626.
- Green, Johnny; Garry Barker (2003) [1997]. A Riot of Our Own: Night and Day with The Clash (3rd ed.). London: Orion. ISBN 0-7528-5843-2. OCLC 52990890.
- Gruen, Bob; Chris Salewicz (2004) [2001]. The Clash (3rd ed.). London: Omnibus. ISBN 1-903399-34-3. OCLC 69241279.
- Needs, Kris (25 January 2005). Joe Strummer and the Legend of the Clash. London: Plexus. ISBN 0-85965-348-X. OCLC 53155325.
- Topping, Keith (2004) [2003]. The Complete Clash (2nd ed.). Richmond: Reynolds & Hearn. ISBN 1-903111-70-6. OCLC 63129186.
