= Eagles of Death Metal discography =

Band discography

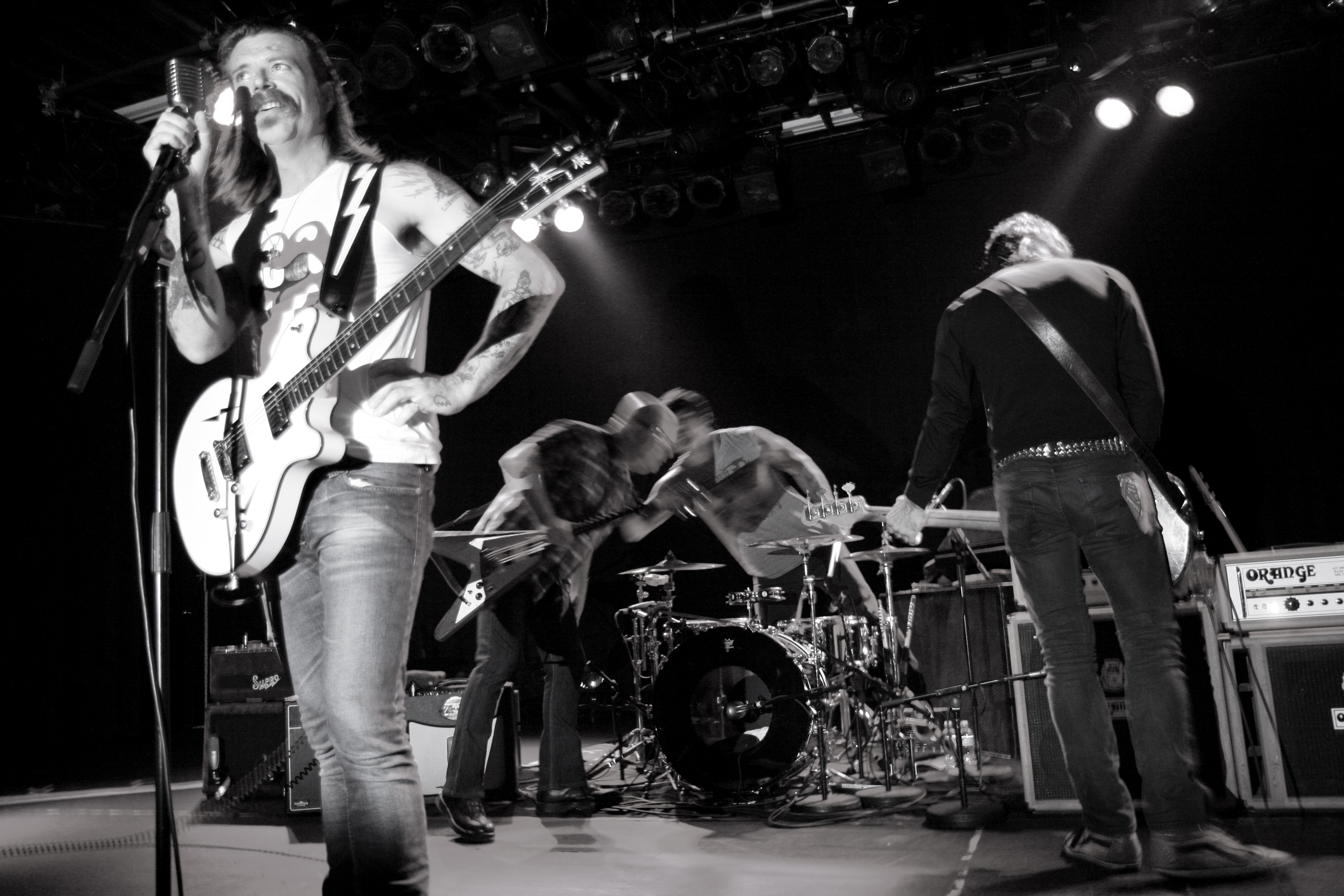
- Eagles of Death Metal playing the Commodore Ballroom on 20 July 2009.
- Studio albums: 4
- Singles: 12

The discography of American rock band Eagles of Death Metal comprises four studio albums and twelve singles.

Peace, Love, Death Metal, their debut studio album, was released on 23 March 2004. Several songs from the album were used in American television commercials including those for Ask.com, Comcast, Payless ShoeSource, Nissan Motors, Budweiser, Pontiac Motors, Wendy's, as well as in the trailer for the film Thank You for Smoking and for a promotional disc for the film Grindhouse which was available prior to the film's release at Hot Topic stores. The first song on the album, "I Only Want You," was also used on the soundtrack for the PS2 game Gran Turismo 4, as well as by Microsoft in advertising for the launch of Windows 8. "Miss Alissa" was featured on Nike's FIFA World Cup 2014 campaign video. The video is entitled "Winner stays" and featured footballers Cristiano Ronaldo, Andrea Pirlo, Neymar, Tim Howard and many others.

Death by Sexy, their second studio album, was released on 11 April 2006. The track "Chase the Devil" from the album was included in the soundtrack for Tony Hawk's Project 8. The track "Don't Speak (I Came to Make a Bang!)" was also part of the soundtrack for Electronic Arts' Need for Speed: Carbon. "Cherry Cola" was used in a Microsoft Zune commercial, and "Don't Speak" was featured in Epic Movie, where the band is seen playing it live; in addition, the song was used in a Guy Ritchie-directed Nike ad ahead of UEFA Euro 2008.

Heart On, their third studio album, was released on 28 October 2008. The single from the third album "Wannabe in L.A." is in the game Midnight Club: Los Angeles. The song also features in the music rhythm game Guitar Hero 5 and the racing game DiRT 2. "I'm Your Torpedo" and "High Voltage" were also featured in the 2009 Austin set film Whip It. "Now I'm A Fool" was used in the 2012 film Silver Linings Playbook. The track "High Voltage" was featured in an online campaign for Head & Shoulders in 2010.

Zipper Down, their fourth studio album, was released on 2 October 2015. The first single from the album "Complexity" was made available for streaming on Pitchfork Media's website. On 13 November 2015, the band was playing a sold-out concert to about 1,500 guests at Le Bataclan theatre in Paris, when the venue was attacked by terrorists, who killed at least 89 concertgoers. Following the attack, a Facebook campaign was created with the intention of getting the band's cover of the Duran Duran song "Save a Prayer" to number one on the UK Singles Chart. The campaign was promoted by Duran Duran, who promised to donate their proceeds from the sale to charity.

== Albums ==
=== Studio albums ===
Title	Details	Peak chart positions										Sales
Title	Details	US	AUS	AUT	BEL (FL)	BEL (WA)	FRA	GER	NL	SWI	UK	Sales
Peace, Love, Death Metal	Released: 23 March 2004; Label: AntAcidAudio; Formats: CD, LP	—	50	—	37	—	—	89	—	—	124	
Death by Sexy	Released: 11 April 2006; Label: Downtown; Formats: CD, LP	113	51	—	98	—	169	60	— (Note: Death by Sexy did not enter the Dutch Album Top 100, but entered the Dutch Midprice chart at number 50.)	—	108	
Heart On	Released: 28 October 2008; Label: Downtown; Formats: CD, LP	57	40	—	59	—	100	—	90	97	91	US: 50,000
Zipper Down	Released: 2 October 2015; Label: T-Boy/UMe; Formats: CD, LP	59	29	35	24	46	42	39	38	22	32	
"—" denotes an album that did not chart or was not released in that territory.

== Singles ==
=== As lead artist ===
Title	Year	Peak chart positions										Album
Title	Year	US Alt.	BEL (FL)	BEL (WA)	FRA	GER	NL	POR	SCO	SWI	UK	Album
"I Only Want You"	2004	—	—	—	—	—	—	—	—	—	—	Peace, Love, Death Metal
"Speaking in Tongues"	2004	—	—	—	—	—	—	—	—	—	—	Peace, Love, Death Metal
"Shasta Beast"	2006	—	—	—	—	—	—	—	—	—	—	Death by Sexy
"I Want You So Hard (Boy's Bad News)"	2006	—	—	—	—	—	—	—	38	—	73	Death by Sexy
"I Gotta Feelin' (Just Nineteen)"	2006	—	—	—	—	—	—	—	97	—	180	Death by Sexy
"Cherry Cola"	2006	—	—	—	—	—	—	—	—	—	—	Death by Sexy
"Wannabe in L.A."	2008	38	—	—	177	—	—	—	—	—	—	Heart On
"Secret Plans"	2008	—	—	—	—	—	—	—	—	—	—	Heart On
"High Voltage"	2008	—	—	—	—	—	—	—	—	—	—	Heart On
"Anything 'Cept the Truth"	2009	—	—	—	—	—	—	—	—	—	—	Heart On
"Complexity"	2015	—	— (Note: "Complexity" did not enter the Flanders Ultratop 50, but peaked at number 30 on the Ultratip chart.)	—	193	—	—	—	—	—	—	Zipper Down
"Save a Prayer"	2015	—	5	11	23	48	73	13	18	72	53	Zipper Down
"I Love You All the Time"	2015	—	—	—	—	—	—	—	—	—	—	Zipper Down
"—" denotes a single that did not chart or was not released in that territory.

== Other appearances ==
Year	Title	Album
2006	"Cherry Cola"	Zune commercial
2006	"Flames Go Higher"	Pontiac GTO commercial
2006	"Don't Speak (I Came to Make a Bang!)"	Compound Volume One
2007	"Don't Speak (I Came to Make a Bang!)"	Epic Movie
2008	"Don't Speak (I Came to Make a Bang!)"	Need for Speed: Carbon
2008	"Don't Speak (I Came to Make a Bang!)"	Lost Boys: The Tribe
2010	"Don't Speak (I Came to Make a Bang!)"	The Losers trailer
2011	"Don't Speak (I Came to Make a Bang!)"	The Green Hornet trailer
2011	"Don't Speak (I Came to Make a Bang!)"	Nike's Take it to the Next level advert
2017	"Let 'em Talk" (Kesha featuring Eagles of Death Metal)	Rainbow
2017	"Boogie Feet" (Kesha featuring Eagles of Death Metal)	Rainbow

== Videos ==
Title	Details
DVD by Sexy	Released: 10 October 2006; Distributor: Downtown Records
