= DVD by Sexy =

- Directed by: Liam Lynch
- Starring: Eagles of Death Metal
- Music by: Eagles of Death Metal
- Distributed by: Downtown Records
- Release date: October 10, 2006
- Running time: 93 minutes
- Country: United States
- Language: English

DVD by Sexy is the only official DVD from Eagles of Death Metal.

A companion release to Death by Sexy, the DVD compiles footage shot by sometime collaborator Liam Lynch over the course of the album's eight day recording session. Besides the main feature, the DVD also contains numerous live performances and music videos, including the previously unreleased video for the song "Solid Gold".

According to Jesse Hughes, the band initially didn't want to do the DVD:

We didn't want to make a DVD, but Liam was like, 'Dude, I have to film what's going on here'. The DVD's about a band making an album, but it's also about two best friends [Hughes and Homme] having the time of their lives.

== Track listing ==
1. "I Like To Move In The Night"
2. "The Ballad Of Queen Bee And Baby Duck"
3. "Cherry Cola"
4. "I Gotta Feelin (Just Nineteen)"
5. "Keep Your Head Up"
6. "Solid Gold"
7. "I Want You So Hard (Boy's Bad News)"
8. "Rehearsal"
9. "Speaking in Tongues"
10. "I Only Want You"
11. "Midnight Creeper"
