= Pin art =

Artistic novelty toy

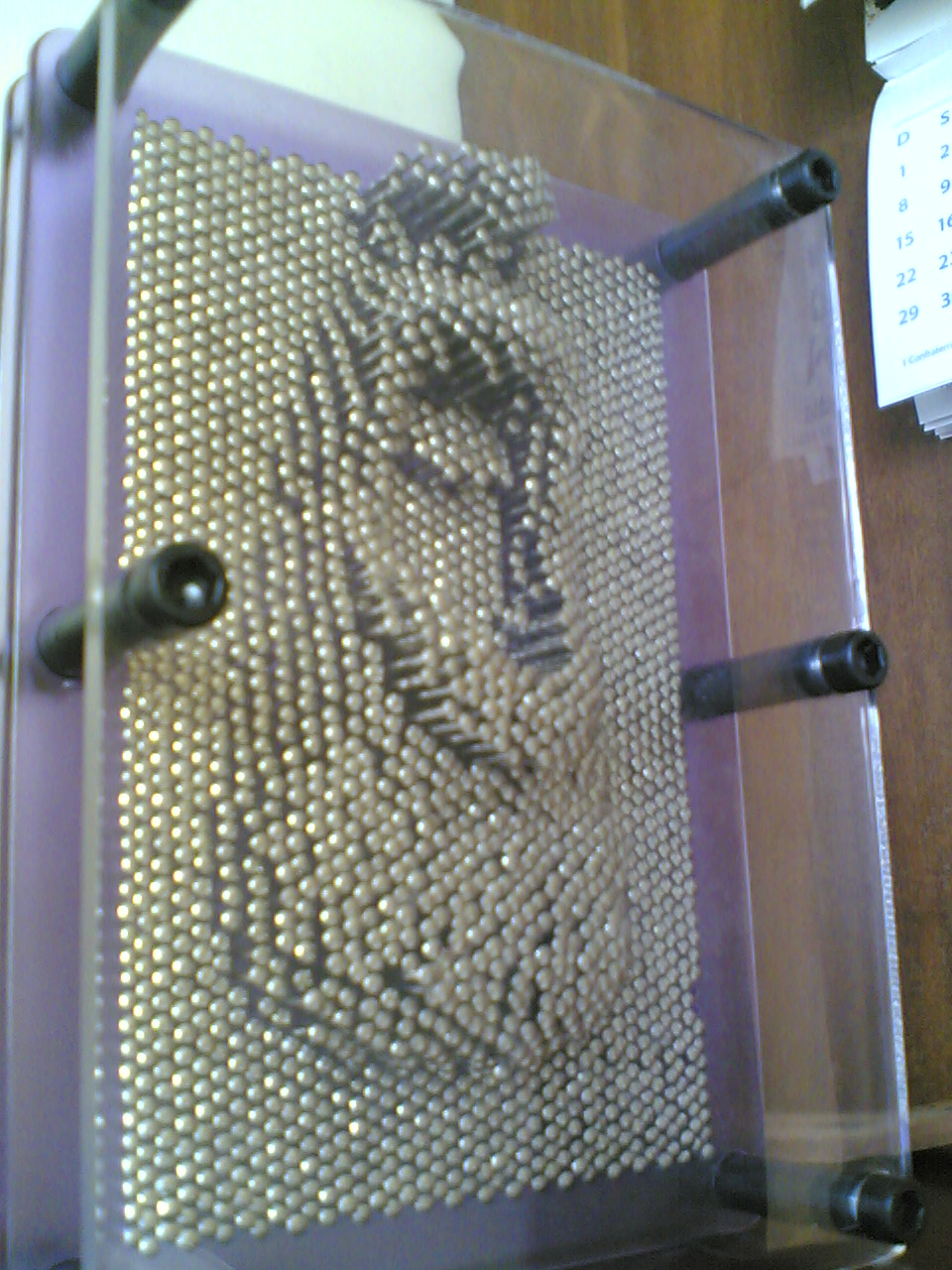
The impression of a person's nose and mouth on a pinscreen

Pin art, also known as a pinscreen, is an executive toy. It consists of a boxed surface made of a crowded array of pins that are free to slide in and out independently in a screen to create a three-dimensional relief. Other similar product names are "PinPressions" and "Pinhead". The original Pinscreen toys were made of metal pins, which were heavier and tended to bend easily; newer Pinscreen toys are generally made of plastic pins. Pinscreens have also been used for animation production; a larger device working on a similar principle was invented by Claire Parker in 1935.

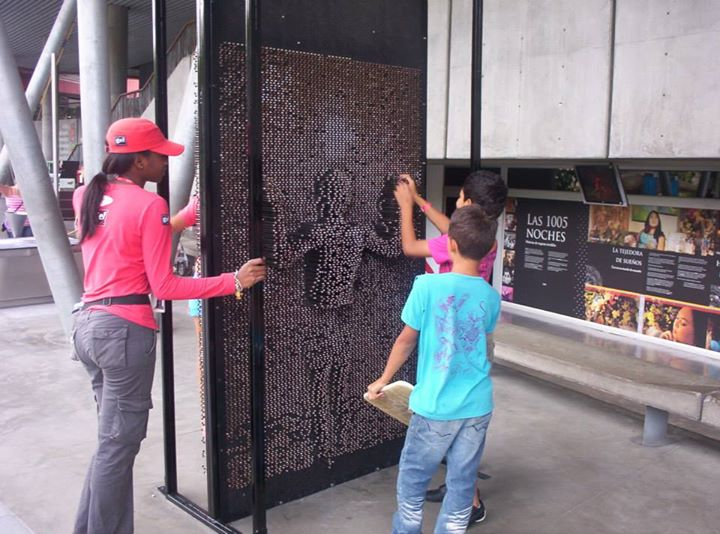
A large pinscreen at the Parque Explora in Colombia

A 4-by-8-foot (1.2 m × 2.4 m) pinscreen is at the Swiss Science Center Technorama in Winterthur, Switzerland. This screen is like a large 3D drawing pad that can work with different sizes of paintbrushes for calligraphy.

== In popular culture ==
- The pinscreen was popularized in the 1985 music video for the Midge Ure song "If I Was", which included a giant body-sized version.
- In the 1988 film Vice Versa, Marshall Seymour keeps a pinscreen on his office desk. Charlie (Judge Reinhold) pushes his face into it and sticks out his tongue.
- In another 1988 movie Earth Girls Are Easy, as Valerie is wrecking various things of her philandering boyfriend Ted, she takes his pinscreen and also sticks out her tongue.
- In the 1990 film Darkman, a pinscreen is used to duplicate a character's hand.
- In Tiny Toon Adventures, Elmyra (Voiced by Cree Summer) is seen using a pinscreen on her belly.
- A 1997 Coca-Cola ad, directed by Industrial Light & Magic, involves the use of a computer-generated imagery pinscreen.
- The 1999 film Toy Story 2 features a pinscreen that Buzz Lightyear is pushed into whilst fighting Utility Belt Buzz Lightyear.
- In the 2000 film X-Men, a computerized pinscreen displaying a model of New York City is used by the X-Men to plan an attack against Magneto.
- A digitally produced pinscreen is featured in the 2005 music video for the Nine Inch Nails song "Only", directed by David Fincher.
- Similar to "Only", a digitally produced pinscreen is featured in the 2008 music video for the Eagles of Death Metal song "Wannabe in LA".
- A 2007 advertising campaign by the Discovery Channel involved a pinscreen forming various images, such as that of the Sydney Opera House and whales.
- The 2013 film Man of Steel involves several CG pinscreens which serve as personal computers on Kal-El's homeworld of Krypton.
