= Wannabe in L.A. =

Single by Eagles of Death Metal

from the album Heart On
- Released: October 7, 2008
- Recorded: 2008
- Genre: Garage rock
- Length: 2:15
- Label: Downtown
- Songwriter(s): Jesse Hughes and Josh Homme
- Producer(s): Josh Homme

Eagles of Death Metal singles chronology
"I Gotta Feelin (Just Nineteen)" (2006)	"Wannabe in L.A." (2008)

"Wannabe in L.A." is the first single from the Eagles of Death Metal's third studio album Heart On. It reached number 38 on the Billboard Hot Modern Rock Tracks chart.

Hughes credits inspiration to the song on drummer Joey Castillo:

Dude, listen. I’m the fuckin luckiest hillbilly on the face of the Earth to be in this touring band right now, with this cast of criminals. [Joey] Castillo… he’s one of the fuckin reasons I wrote Wannabe In L.A., dude. Cause L.A. is the great irony of my life. How it is that I came to the phoniest fucking environment ever made by man, Hollywood, and was able to find the best examples of friendship, integrity, truth… I was able to find role models and a family of friends who’ve looked out for me above and beyond anything I’ve ever experienced in my life. That shit doesn’t happen everyday, and you’d be an asshole to miss that.

The song also references Alain Johannes and Natasha Shneider when Hughes says 'Alain and Natasha always make me say, I really wanna be in L.A."

The music video contains two versions directed by Liam Lynch. The Standard version is the original version and the Pins version uses CGI pins recreating images from the original music video.

The song is featured in the video game Midnight Club: Los Angeles which was released seven days before the song was released. It can also be heard in the video games Colin McRae: Dirt 2, MLB 09: The Show, Shaun White Skateboarding, and is a playable selection in Guitar Hero 5. It also appears at the beginning of the film The Perfect Host.

== Track listing ==
1. "Wannabe in L.A." - 2:15
