= Truckfighters =

Swedish stoner rock band

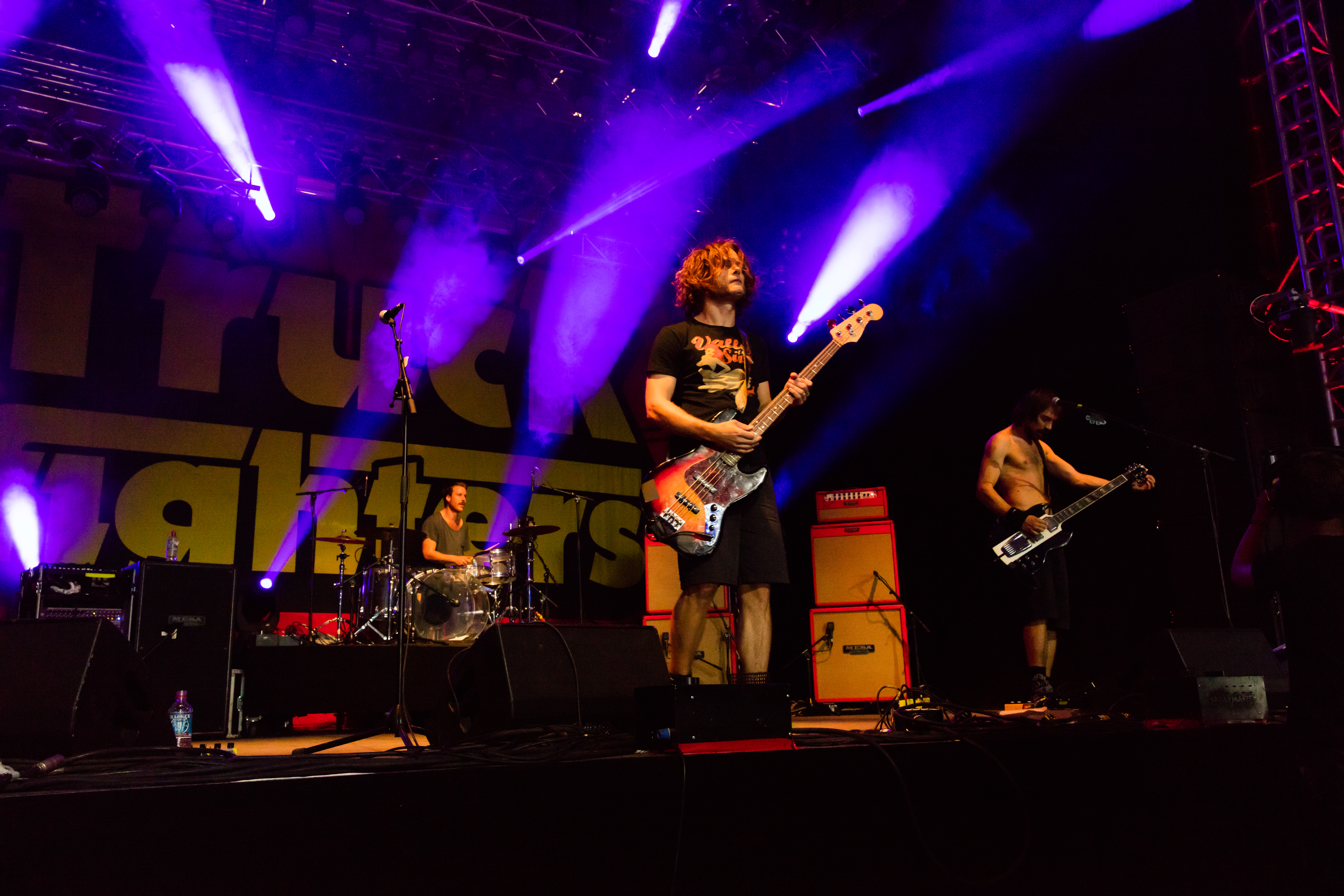
- Truckfighters at Wacken Open Air 2015

Background information
- Origin: Örebro, Sweden
- Genres: Stoner rock
- Years active: 2001–2018, 2019–present
- Labels: Fuzzorama, MeteorCity, Poison Tree
- Members: Dango; Ozo; Toro
- Past members: El Danno; Enzo; Franco; Fredo; Frongo; Paco; Pedro; Pezo; Poncho
- Website: truckfighters.com

Truckfighters is a Swedish two-man stoner rock band with different drummers joining on and off. Formed in Örebro in 2001, the band's current lineup comprises founding members Oskar "Ozo" Cedermalm and Niklas "Dango" Källgren, and currently Joel "Jolo" Alex on drums. They have released five studio albums.

== History ==
Truckfighters was formed in Örebro, Sweden in 2001. After releasing EPs Desert Cruiser and Headed For God's Warehouse in 2001 and 2002 respectively, they recorded the split-EP Truckfighters Vs. Firestone; Fuzzsplit of The Century with local Swedish band Firestone in 2003. In 2005 they released their debut album Gravity X on both Fuzzorama Records and MeteorCity Records. Their follow-up album, Phi, was released in 2007 by Poison Tree Records in the U.S. and on the Fuzzorama label elsewhere. They have been featured on the MTV Sweden show "Fuzz". The band has done extensive touring over the years, playing more than 300 live shows, most of them in Europe. Their first US tour, in July 2011, included stops in New York, Chicago, Detroit, and Cleveland.

The film Truckfighters (Fuzzomentary) by Joerg Steineck and Christian Maciejewski portrays the band's life. It was released in December 2011 and features interviews with Josh Homme of Queens of the Stone Age. The film provides an ironic, entertaining view of the three "ordinary" guys who transform into Fuzz Monsters onstage.

Their album Universe was released on 24 February 2014. As a teaser, The Chairman EP was released in October 2013.

The band released their studio album, V, on 30 September 2016. It marked a significant change in style for the trio, as they intermingle their trademark heavy stoner rock sound with lengthy atmospheric sections.

On 21 February 2018, the band announced on their Facebook page that they are going on a "long, long hiatus" and "Might come back stronger than ever (that's the only way) or not at all!" On 4 March 2019, the band was announced to reconvene to play an exclusive set at Psycho Las Vegas 2019, and took the Pool stage on 28 Aug as a part of a reunion tour. During the second half of 2019 and early 2020, the band toured the album Gravity X in its entirety from finish to start.

Since 2019, the band has been holding an annual festival in Södermalm, Stockholm called Fuzzfest. The event usually takes place in the middle of november at the Debaser venue. The lineup has previously consisted of bands such as Dozer, Domkraft, Greenleaf, and Truckfighters themselves.

== Musical style ==
Their sound has been described as classic stoner/desert rock, similar to bands like Dozer, Fu Manchu, and Kyuss.

== Members ==
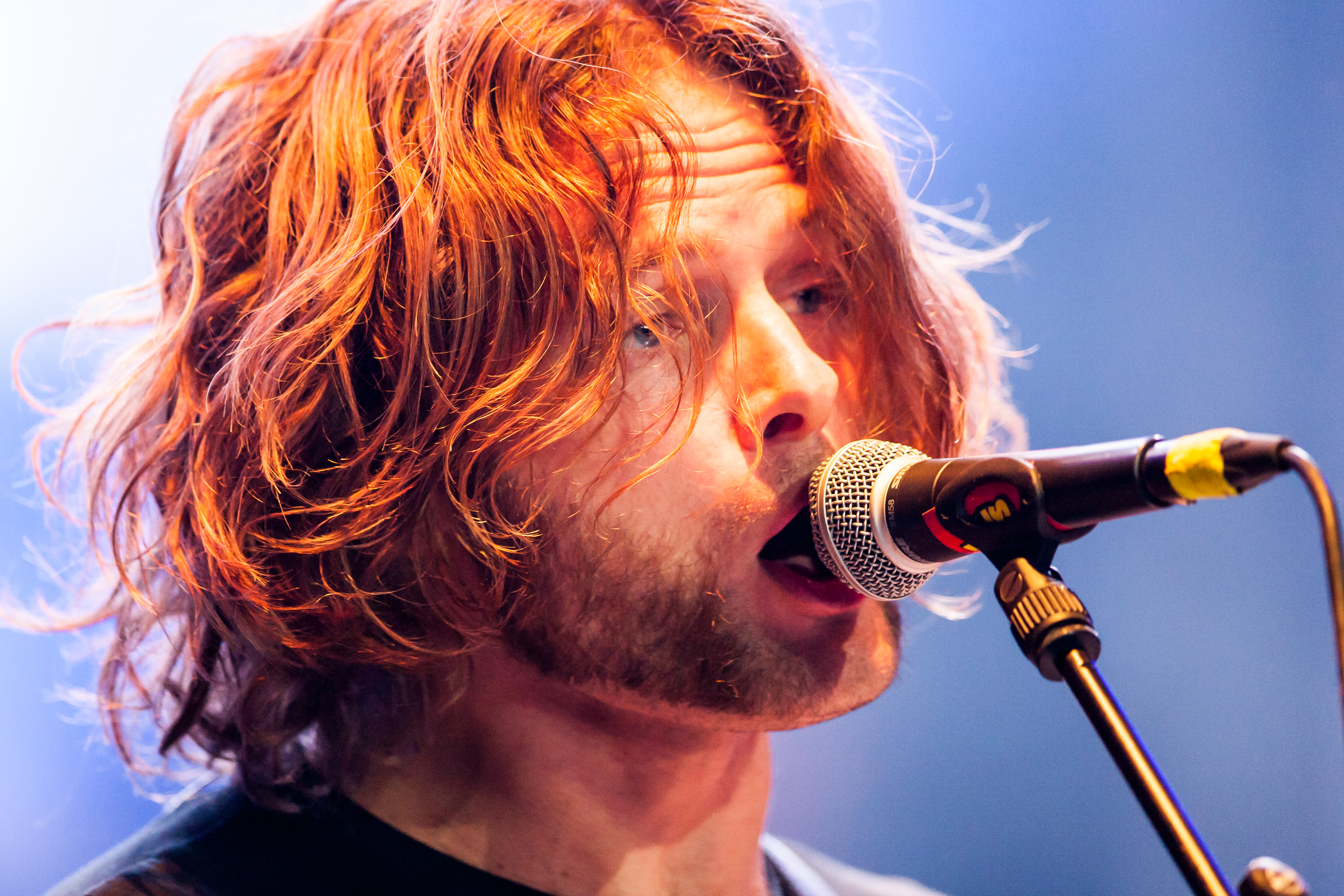
Oskar "Ozo" Cedermalm at Wacken Open Air 2015

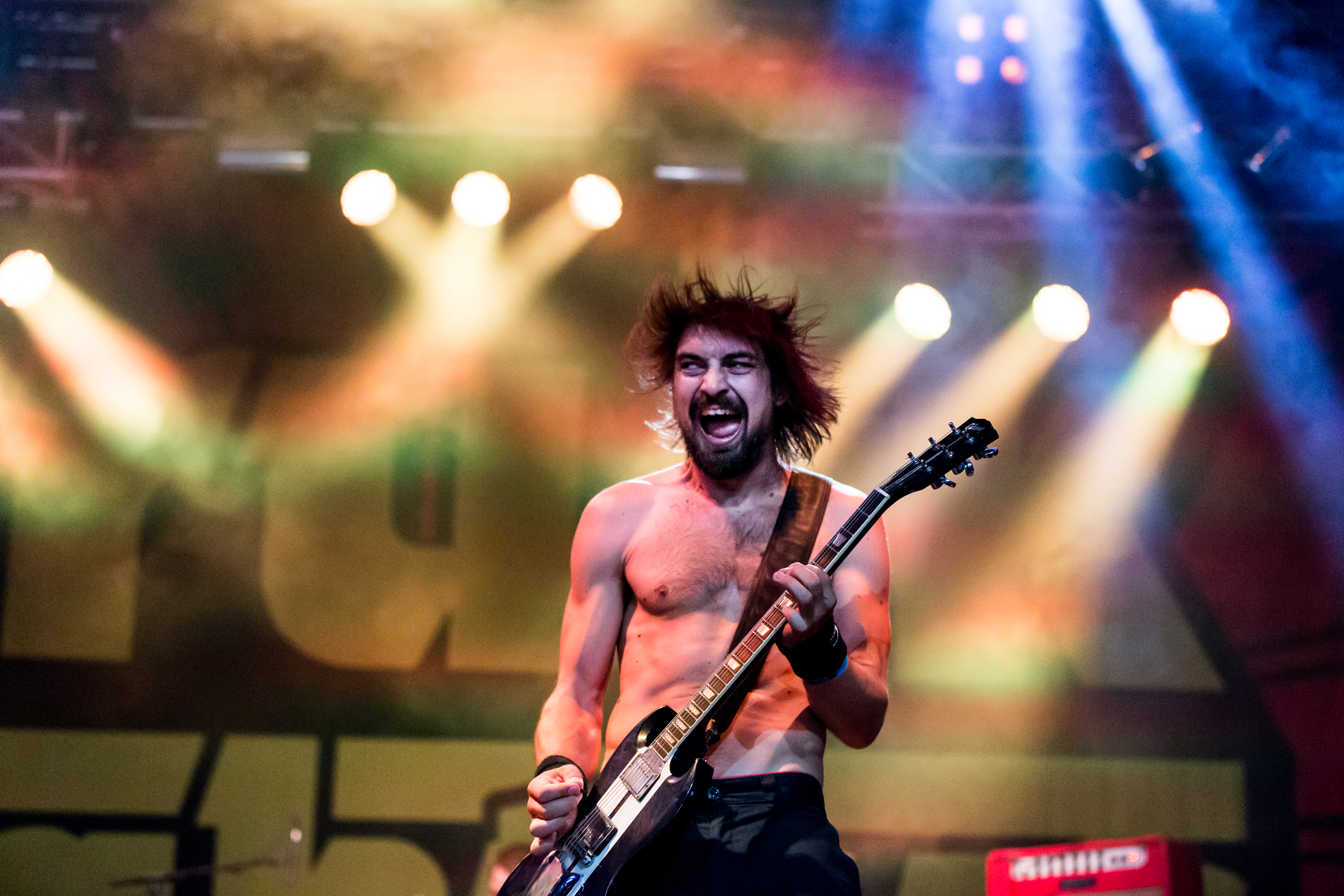
Niklas "Dango" Källgren at Wacken Open Air 2015

=== Current members ===
- Ozo (Oskar Cedermalm) – vocals, bass (2001–present)
- Dango (Niklas Källgren) – guitar (2001–present)
- Jolo (Joel Alex) - drums (session)

=== Former members ===
- Toro (Johan Marberg) – drums (2019–2021; session)
- Pezo (Oscar Johansson) – drums (2001–2003, 2008–2009, 2011–2012, 2017)
- El Danno (Daniel Israelsson) – drums (2016)
- Enzo (Axel Larsson) – drums (2015)
- Poncho (Andre Kvarnström) – drums (2013–2014)
- Frongo (Fredrik Larsson) – drums (2010–2011)
- Pedro (Pär Hjulström) – drums (2009–2010)
- Fredo (Winfred Kennerknecht) – guitar (2008)
- Paco (Andreas von Ahn) – drums (2008)

=== Session and touring members ===
- Franco (Fredrik Nilsson) – guitar (2006)
- Mckenzo (Danne Mckenzie) – drums (2012)
- Lobo (Aaron Michael Boyer) – drums (2017)
- Taco (Robert Wiiand) – drums (2016–2017)
- Maco (Marcus Johansson) – drums (2016)

== Discography ==
=== Studio albums ===
- Gravity X (2005)
- Phi (2007)
- Mania (2009)
- Universe (2014)
- V (2016)
- Masterflow (2026)

=== Live Albums ===
- Live in London (2016)

=== Compilation albums ===
- Hidden Treasures of Fuzz - The Anniversary of the Century! (2011)
- Gravity X / Phi (2013)
- The Complete History (2014)

=== EPs ===
- Desert Cruiser EP (2001)
- Heading for God's Warehouse (2002)
- Truckfighters vs. Firestone – Fuzzsplit of the Century (2003)
- The Chairman Special EP (2013)

=== Singles ===
- The Return of the Fuzzsplit, Vol. 1 (2014)
- Calm Before the Storm (2016)
- Hawkshaw (2016)
- Analougus (2020)
- The Bliss (2026)
- Truce (2026)
- The Gorgon (2026)
