= Universe (Truckfighters album) =

Studio album by Truckfighters
- Released: 21 February 2014
- Recorded: Studio Bombshelter, Örebro, Sweden
- Genre: Stoner rock, stoner metal, heavy metal, desert rock
- Length: 44:38
- Label: Fuzzorama Records
- Producer: Dango and Ozo

Truckfighters chronology
Mania (2009)	Universe (2014)	V (2016)

Universe is the fourth studio album by Swedish rock band Truckfighters, released on 21 February 2014 on Fuzzorama Records.

== Track listing ==
All tracks written by Truckfighters.

No.	Title	Length
1.	"Mind Control"	3:59
2.	"The Chairman"	7:54
3.	"Convention"	1:42
4.	"Get Lifted"	7:57
5.	"Prophet"	4:49
6.	"Dream Sale"	4:25
7.	"Mastodont"	13:54
Total length:		44:38

== Personnel ==
=== Truckfighters ===
- Ozo - bass, vocals
- Dango - guitars

=== Additional musicians ===
- Poncho - drums (tracks 1 and 7)
- Pezo - drums (tracks 2–6)
- Rebecca Nylander - backing vocals (track 3)
