= Melanie is demented =

Music Artist

Melanie Is Demented
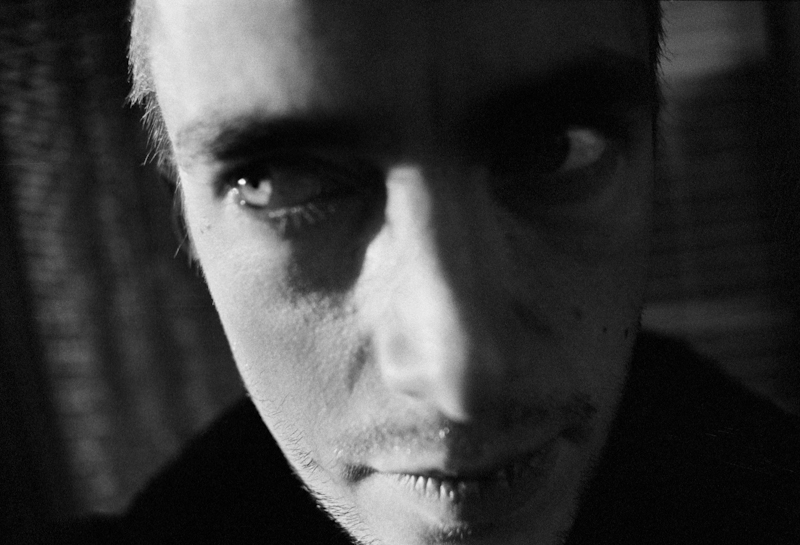

Background information
- Origin: Stockholm, Sweden
- Genres: Punk rock, hip hop, lo-fi, blues, electronica
- Years active: 2000–present
- Labels: Wormfood Records
- Members: Melanie Martinsson

Melanie Is Demented is an electro punk rock artist from Stockholm, Sweden. His name is Melanie Martinsson. He started out as an artist in the year 2000 and is currently signed to Wormfood Records. His music has a mixed style including rap, punk rock, alternative rock, electronica, techno and industrial. He has released 4 mixtapes, 4 EPs and 5 albums, though due to the current music industry's lack of tangible/physical record production/sales, he coined the term 'Dement-O-Vision' to describe the recent digital releases. With a lack of genres to compare his music to, he has also coined the term "skräckno" as a genre, which is a play of words in Swedish which can be translated into "horror-techno."

In 2010 Melanie Martinsson and freelance photographer Alexander Donka worked on a photoproject depicting the recording of the latest album. In 2011 the album was successful on a zero marketing budget and sold Gold (20k), on ESC season, and also received the Impala Sales Award.

Melanie is Demented has music featured in various films, such as the Truckfighters movie. Melanie has extensively used social networking to build a fanbase.

In 2014 Melanieisdemented releases the album Blind, which is a soundtrack to a book with the same title and pseudonym. It is the most costly DIY-project in Sweden to date. The album is a themealbum which accompanies the book. The book is about what would happen if all of the worlds firearms were exchanged with oranges.

In 2015 Melanie Is Demented plays a sold-out European tour together with Portuguese indielabel Chili Com Carne, and all profits go to charity. The promoted mixtape get recognised as top five of the year by various papers.

In 2016 he releases a critically acclaimed album called We Split Up Searching For You, a project describing the horrors his neighborhood suffered during 2015, with all proceeds going to charity.

He is currently working on the followup album Ulsa, a sequel to Blind entitled Kyle's Apartment, a clothing line entitled KKCCBB, and a machine that can only fire human teeth at armor-piercing velocity entitled Grief MK 1.

== Discography ==
- Expendable Material - (2002)
- Wormfood Sessions - (2003)
- M.I.D'S Kramgoa - (2003)
- Busfärskt Material - (2004)
- Unleash Destruction With Precision In 1ST Person View Mode - (2007)
- How To Succeed In The Musicbusiness Without Really Dying - (2007)
- How To Succeed In The Waste Management Business Without Really Dying - (2008)
- How To Die Institutionalized Without Any Chance Of Surviving - (2009)
- Die Or Get Rich Tryin - (2009)
- F**K You And Thanks For Nothing - (2010)
- Melanie Är Demented - (2011)
- MXLXNXXXSDXMXNTXD - (2011)
- Blind - (2014)
- We Split Up Searching For You - (2016)
- Life Is Certain Death Is Not - (2023)
- Ulsa - (TBA)
