= Truckfighters (film) =

- Directed by: Joerg Steineck
- Produced by: Rocksquad / I’m Filming Productions
- Music by: Truckfighters, Greenleaf (band), Witchcraft (band), Melanie is demented, Let Me Out, We Hunt Buffalo, Red Stoner Sun, Alvin Tyler, Miriam Cutler
- Release date: December 13, 2011
- Running time: 84 minutes
- Country: Germany
- Languages: English, Swedish

Truckfighters is a documentary directed by Joerg Steineck about the Swedish rock band named Truckfighters.

It incorporates various interviews with the band, showing their members working on day-to-day jobs in their home town Örebro, recording the album "Mania" in their studio and following them on tour through Europe.

The film, which is documentative in style of narration, signifies itself a "fuzzomentary film". It provides various surreal graphical sequences of fictional and non fictional content, which serve as connective and illustrative elements. A certain graphical style leads as stylistic central theme through the entire film.

Truckfighters additionally features short guest appearances of well known names like Josh Homme (Queens Of The Stone Age, Kyuss), Alfredo Hernandez (Kyuss, Yawning Man), Nick Oliveri (Queens of the Stone Age, Mondo Generator). Furthermore it provides guest appearances by singer/songwriter Chris Maher (anchorman) and first hour Kyuss member Chris Cockrell (annotator/off-voice).

== Synopsis ==
The documentary generally portrays the band by uncommon insight into their double-tracked lifestyle in an ironical and satirical way, not to discredit them but to reveal the common issues of a rock band and the often-stereotyped musical genre they are attributed to (stoner rock).

Some scenes are visibly based on the artwork of the Truckfighters Mania record, which was also designed by the filmmakers Joerg Steineck and Christian Macijewski.

The film has a total runtime of 83 minutes and is subdivided into 9 chapters:

1. Common
2. How To Get Things Done
3. Road
4. Home
5. Issues
6. The Body Burden
7. Family Fights
8. Big
9. The Drummer Dilemma

== Featured bands ==
Truckfighters, Queens of the Stone Age, Fu Manchu, Kyuss, Valient Thorr, Witchcraft, Graveyard, Let Me Out, Red Stoner Sun, The Freeks, Nebula
