= Phi (Truckfighters album) =

Studio album by Truckfighters
- Released: 5 October 2007
- Recorded: Studio Bombshelter (Örebro, Sweden) and Studio Domagkstrasse 33 (Munchen, Germany), 2006 – 2007
- Genre: Stoner rock, stoner metal, heavy metal, desert rock
- Length: 54:59
- Label: Fuzzorama Records, Poison Tree Records
- Producer: Truckfighters

Truckfighters chronology
Gravity X (2005)	Phi (2007)	Mania (2009)

Phi is the second studio album by Swedish rock band Truckfighters, released 5 October 2007 on Fuzzorama Records.

== Track listing ==
All tracks written by Truckfighters.

No.	Title	Length
1.	"Atomic"	5:08
2.	"Fortyeight"	4:41
3.	"Kickdown"	5:22
4.	"Chameleon"	10:03
5.	"Dysthymia"	4:23
6.	"Slacken"	3:27
7.	"Warhead"	4:44
8.	"Traffic"	4:31
9.	"Slides"	5:09
10.	"The Game"	7:31
Total length:		54:59

== Personnel ==
=== Truckfighters ===
- Ozo - bass, vocals
- Fredo - guitar
- Dango - guitar
- Paco - drums

=== Additional musicians ===
- Kersti Manell - cello
- Andreas Strömbäck - organ
- Stefan Koglek - guitar solo (track 4)
- Oscar Johansson - congas (track 9)
- Martin Augustini - backing vocals (track 9)
