= Gravity X =

Studio album by Truckfighters
- Released: July 12, 2005
- Recorded: December 2004 – January 2005
- Studio: Bombshelter Studios
- Genre: Stoner rock, desert rock
- Length: 67:17
- Label: Fuzzorama Records, MeteorCity Records
- Producer: Truckfighters

Truckfighters chronology
Gravity X (2005)	Phi (2007)

Gravity X is the debut studio album by Swedish rock band Truckfighters, released on 12 July 2005 by Fuzzorama Records. The album was reissued alongside their subsequent album, Phi, in a compilation LP release in June 2013.

== Track listing ==
All tracks written by Truckfighters, except for "A. Zapruder" written by Truckfighters and Anders Jacobson.

No.	Title	Length
1.	"Desert Cruiser"	7:30
2.	"Gargarismo"	5:01
3.	"Momentum"	7:28
4.	"Freewheelin'"	4:16
5.	"The Deal"	4:10
6.	"Superfunk"	5:08
7.	"Subfloor"	2:32
8.	"Gweedo-Weedo"	5:43
9.	"Manhattan Project"	6:26
10.	"In Search of (The)"	3:35
11.	"Intermission"	2:06
12.	"A. Zapruder"	4:54
13.	"Altered State"	8:28
Total length:		67:17

== Critical reception ==
AllMusic reviewed Gravity X, giving it 3.5 stars.

Professional ratings
Review scores
Source	Rating
AllMusic	3.5/5 stars
Blabbermouth.net	6.5/10

== Personnel ==
=== Truckfighters ===
- Ozo - bass, vocals
- Fredo - guitar
- Dango - guitar
- Paco - drums (tracks 1–4, 6–10)
- Pezo - drums (tracks 5, 11, 13)

=== Additional musicians ===
- Anders Jacobson - drums (track 12)
- Andreas Alm - trumpet
- Petter Fridell - trombone
