= Peace, Love, Death Metal =

Studio album by Eagles of Death Metal
- Released: March 23, 2004
- Recorded: 2003
- Genres: Garage rock; rockabilly
- Length: 44:40
- Label: AntAcidAudio
- Producer: Josh Homme

Eagles of Death Metal chronology
Live at Slims (2003)	Peace, Love, Death Metal (2004)	Death by Sexy (2006)

Professional ratings
Aggregate scores
Source	Rating
Metacritic	73/100
Review scores
Source	Rating
AllMusic	3.5/5 stars
The Austin Chronicle	3.5/4 stars
Blender	4/5 stars
Entertainment Weekly	A−
Pitchfork	7.2/10
Rolling Stone	3.5/5 stars
Stylus Magazine	B
Uncut	3/5 stars

Peace, Love, Death Metal is the debut studio album by American rock band Eagles of Death Metal. It was released on March 23, 2004, through AntAcidAudio.

== Making of the album ==
Eagles of Death Metal is a garage rock band fronted by Jesse Hughes. The album was recorded primarily by Hughes (credited as "J. Devil Huge" or "Mr. Boogie Man") and Josh Homme (credit as "Carlo von Sexron" or "Baby Duck"), and featured guest appearances by Tim Vanhamel, Brody Dalle, Nick Oliveri, Alain Johannes, and Natasha Shneider.

Homme told MTV News that the band is led by Hughes: "I just sit behind the drums and play rock and roll, which is a great change of pace for me. J. Devil writes everything, every lyric and riff, and he's a fantastic songwriter. He and I go through and arrange them, and I lay down harmonies, but it's really his thing. It's the antithesis of the bloated rock-attitude bullshit I've had to deal with recently." Homme promoted the band and wore one of its t-shirts when appearing on the Lollapalooza tour with his main band Queens of the Stone Age in 2003.

== Track listing ==
All tracks by Jesse Hughes and Josh Homme, except where noted.

No.	Title	Length
1.	"I Only Want You"	2:48
2.	"Speaking in Tongues"	2:49
3.	"So Easy"	4:00
4.	"Flames Go Higher"	2:53
5.	"Bad Dream Mama"	3:02
6.	"English Girl"	2:38
7.	"Stacks O' Money"	2:48
8.	"Midnight Creeper"	1:57
9.	"Stuck in the Metal" (cover of Stealers Wheel's "Stuck in the Middle with You": Gerry Rafferty/Joe Egan)	3:18
10.	"Already Died"	3:00
11.	"Kiss the Devil"	2:52
12.	"Whorehoppin' (Shit, Goddamn)"	3:34
13.	"San Berdoo Sunburn"	3:42
14.	"Wastin' My Time"	2:42
15.	"Miss Alissa"	2:38
Total length:		44:40

On the UK and the European release there are two extra tracks: "Miss Sanders" and "Just Nineteen". A re-recorded version of the latter appears on the band's follow up Death by Sexy. The European release also featured the video for "Midnight Creeper". The band has shot videos for "I Only Want You" and "Speaking in Tongues". The melody for "Kiss the Devil" is based on the traditional folk song "Sugar Baby".

The band were performing the song "Kiss the Devil" at the Bataclan on 13 November 2015 when an attack killed 89 fans.

== In popular culture ==
- "I Only Want You" was used in the 2004 racing game Gran Turismo 4, the television series Queer as Folk, Windows 8 advertisements, and as downloadable content for the Rock Band video game series.
- "Speaking in Tongues" was featured in the 2005 film Domino, the first episode of the series Supernatural, an episode of the series Viva La Bam, and in the 2007 film Watching the Detectives.
- "Flames Go Higher" was used in an episode of the series The O.C. and the film Circle of Eight.
- "Miss Alissa" was used in the 2014 Nike commercials named "Winner Stays On" and "The Last Game".
- "Stuck in the Metal" was used in the Shaun White snowboarding and skateboarding video The White Album.
- "San Berdoo Sunburn" was used in the 2005 film Domino and the 2017 film Lammbock 2.

== Personnel ==
Eagles of Death Metal

- Jesse Hughes ("J. Devil Huge") – guitar, vocals, drums on "Bad Dream Mama", "Already Died" & "Miss Alissa", +9 vorpal blade on "Bad Dream Mama"
- Josh Homme ("Baby Duck") – drums, backing vocals, percussion on "Bad Dream Mama", "Already Died" & "Miss Alissa", bass on "Whorehoppin' (Shit, Goddamn)"

Additional

- Brody Dalle ("Queen (B)rodie") – backing vocals on "Speaking in Tongues"
- Micah Roy "Strongarm" Hughes – backing vocals on "Speaking in Tongues", rhythm howling on "Miss Alissa"
- Alain Johannes – piano on "English Girl", "Kiss the Devil" & "Wastin' My Time", backing vocals on "Wastin' My Time"
- Nick Oliveri – bass on "Already Died" & "San Berdoo Sunburn"
- Natasha Shneider – backing vocals on "Kiss the Devil"
- Tim Vanhamel – backing vocals on "Speaking in Tongues"
