= Zipper Down =

Studio album by Eagles of Death Metal
- Released: October 2, 2015
- Studio: Pink Duck Studios, Sound City; 11AD
- Genre: Garage rock; desert rock
- Length: 34:16
- Label: Downtown Recordings
- Producer: Josh Homme

Eagles of Death Metal chronology
Heart On (2008)	Zipper Down (2015)	EODM Presents Boots Electric Performing the Best Songs We Never Wrote (2019)

Zipper Down is the fourth studio album from American rock band Eagles of Death Metal. It was released on October 2, 2015. The first single, "Complexity", was made available for streaming on Pitchfork in June 2015. The entire album was made available to stream in an exclusive by NPR on their website, on September 23, 2015. "Oh Girl", "I Love You All The Time" and "Complexity" were previously on Boots Electric's first album Honkey Kong and were remade for Zipper Down.

== Songs ==
The album includes a cover of "Save a Prayer" by Duran Duran. The two bands played the song together on TFI Friday. Following the November 2015 Paris attacks, a Facebook campaign was launched to get the cover of "Save a Prayer" to no. 1. Duran Duran stated that they would donate all of their royalties from the cover to charity. The song ultimately peaked at number 53 for the chart dated the week after the attack.

Following Duran Duran's lead, Eagles of Death Metal announced that they would donate any publishing and mastering fees for covers of their song "I Love You All the Time" to charity, with Homme stating, "If you're a country artist, a DJ, death metal, it doesn't matter, cover that song and we'll donate the publishing." They challenged distribution platforms, including Amazon, iTunes, and Spotify, to donate any of their revenues from covers of the song to charity as well. To date, the artists who have covered the song in response include Florence and the Machine, Imagine Dragons, Jimmy Eat World, Kings of Leon, My Morning Jacket, and Matt Cameron of Pearl Jam.

== Critical reception ==
Professional ratings
Aggregate scores
Source	Rating
AnyDecentMusic?	6.9/10
Metacritic	73/100
Review scores
Source	Rating
Classic Rock	3/5 stars
Consequence of Sound	B
Exclaim!	8/10
NME	4/5 stars
Pitchfork	7.3/10
Sputnikmusic	3.3/5

Zipper Down received generally positive reviews from music critics. At Metacritic, which assigns a normalized rating out of 100 to reviews from mainstream critics, the album received an average score of 73, which indicates "generally favorable reviews", based on 14 reviews.

== Track listing ==
All tracks are written by Jesse Hughes and Joshua Homme, except where noted.

No.	Title	Writer(s)	Length
1.	"Complexity"	Hughes; Homme; Mark Ramos Nishita	2:46
2.	"Silverlake (K.S.O.F.M.)"		3:35
3.	"Got a Woman"		2:02
4.	"I Love You All the Time"	Hughes; Homme; Nishita	3:09
5.	"Oh Girl"	Hughes; Homme; Nishita	4:08
6.	"Got the Power"		3:28
7.	"Skin-Tight Boogie"		3:12
8.	"Got a Woman (Slight Return)"		0:41
9.	"The Deuce"		3:06
10.	"Save a Prayer" (Duran Duran cover)	Nicholas Bates; Simon Le Bon; Andrew Taylor; John Taylor; Roger Taylor	4:40
11.	"The Reverend"		3:29

== Personnel ==
Eagles of Death Metal

- Jesse Hughes ("Boots Electric") – guitar, vocals, baritone guitar, bass, talk box
- Joshua Homme ("Baby Duck") – vocals, baritone guitar, drums, bass, guitar, duduk, knee slaps, organ, percussion, piano, slapstick, slides, talk box, trumpet

Technical personnel

- Joshua Homme – production, engineering
- Mark Rankin – mixing (at Pink Duck Studios)
- Gavin Lurssen – mastering (at Lurssen Mastering)
- Alain Johannes – recording ("Silverlake"), engineering
- Justin Smith – additional engineering
- Pete Martinez – additional engineering
- Eden Galindo – studio tech

Additional musicians

- Tuesday Cross – additional vocals
- Matt Sweeney – additional guitar

Additional personnel

- Chapman Baehler – photography
- Danielle Beverage – design, layout
- Keef Patrick – artwork, design, illustrations
- Marc Pollack – management
- Brian Tomasini – management

== Charts ==
Chart (2015)	Peak position
Australian Albums (ARIA)	29
Austrian Albums (Ö3 Austria)	35
Belgian Albums (Ultratop Flanders)	24
Belgian Albums (Ultratop Wallonia)	46
Dutch Albums (Album Top 100)	38
French Albums (SNEP)	42
German Albums (Offizielle Top 100)	39
Irish Albums (IRMA)	28
Norwegian Albums (VG-lista)	36
Scottish Albums (OCC)	25
Swiss Albums (Schweizer Hitparade)	22
UK Albums (OCC)	32
UK Album Downloads (OCC)	33
US Billboard 200	59
US Top Rock Albums (Billboard)	14
