= Heart On =

Studio album by Eagles of Death Metal
- Released: October 28, 2008
- Recorded: 2008
- Genre: Garage rock
- Length: 40:54
- Label: Downtown
- Producer: Josh Homme

Eagles of Death Metal chronology
| Death by Sexy (2006) | Heart On (2008) | Zipper Down (2015) |

Singles from Heart On
- 1. "Wannabe in L.A." Released: October 7, 2008

Professional ratings
Review scores
| Source | Rating |
|---|---|
| AllMusic | 4/5 stars |
| Artrocker | 3/5 stars |
| Blender | 3.5/5 stars |
| ChartAttack | 4/5 stars |
| NME | 7/10 |
| Pitchfork | 7.4/10 |
| Rolling Stone | 4/5 stars |
| Spectrum Culture | 3/5 stars |
| Spin | 4/5 stars |

Heart On is the third studio album by American rock band Eagles of Death Metal. It was released on October 28, 2008, through Downtown Records.

== Production ==
The album was mastered at Bernie Grundman Mastering by Brian Gardner. The song "Anything 'Cept the Truth" is the final version of the track "Ask Me Why", which was leaked when a source close to the band had their MySpace hacked.

== Release and promotion ==
When asked about the album, lead singer Jesse Hughes stated: "EODM's latest fabulous weapon, a top-secret music missile, a sonic warhead sexually tipped for her pleasure, shot from the deck of USS EODM Mantastic Fantastic." On September 12, 2008, Pitchfork released new information on Heart On, including the album cover and track list.

The first single was "Wannabe in L.A.". The video for the song debuted on the band's MySpace and depicts Jesse Hughes appearing on a pin art in a similar style to the music video for Nine Inch Nails' "Only". There is an alternative version of the video; dubbed the "standard version", which only features Jesse Hughes. The video was directed by Liam Lynch.

On October 21, the album was made available in its entirety for streaming on the MuchMusic website.

== Commercial performance ==
The album debuted at No. 57 on the Billboard 200, and No. 21 on the Top Rock Albums chart, selling around 10,000 copies in its first week of release. The album has sold 50,000 copies in the United States as of September 2015.

== Track listing ==
All tracks are written by Jesse Hughes and Josh Homme.

| No. | Title | Length |
|---|---|---|
| 1. | "Anything 'Cept the Truth" | 4:34 |
| 2. | "Wannabe in L.A." | 2:15 |
| 3. | "(I Used to Couldn't Dance) Tight Pants" | 3:35 |
| 4. | "High Voltage" | 2:43 |
| 5. | "Secret Plans" | 2:22 |
| 6. | "Now I'm a Fool" | 3:41 |
| 7. | "Heart On" | 2:43 |
| 8. | "Cheap Thrills" | 3:42 |
| 9. | "How Can a Man with So Many Friends Feel So All Alone" | 3:02 |
| 10. | "Solo Flights" | 3:25 |
| 11. | "Prissy Prancin'" | 3:40 |
| 12. | "I'm Your Torpedo" | 5:12 |

== Notes ==
- "Anything 'Cept the Truth" has been used in promotions for the Fox television series Lie to Me, commercials to support the USA Network series Burn Notice, and is featured in the video games Guitar Hero World Tour (for downloadable content) and Need for Speed: Shift.
- The song "Wannabe in L.A." is featured in the video games Midnight Club: Los Angeles, MLB 09: The Show, Colin McRae: Dirt 2, and is a playable selection in Guitar Hero 5. It is also included in the opening credits of the 2010 film The Perfect Host and in the finale episode of the first season of the Epix series Get Shorty.

== Personnel ==
- Jesse "Boots Electric" Hughes – lead vocals, rhythm guitar, lead guitar, percussion, talkbox (track 3), bass (tracks 4 & 8), acoustic guitar (track 6)
- Josh "Baby Duck" Homme – drums, bass, lead licks, backing vocals, rhythm guitar, percussion, piano, slide bass (track 2), keyboards (track 4), Casio (track 5), acoustic guitar (track 7), slide guitar (tracks 7–9, 12), vibraslap (track 7)
- Dave Catching – rhythm guitar (tracks 3, 10), lead guitar (track 6), guitar solo (track 8), bass (track 12)
- Brian O'Connor – Bass (tracks 3, 5, 7, 10)
- Troy Van Leeuwen – backing vocals (track 4)
- C-Minus – Clapping (track 4), the beat (track 9)
- Alain Johannes – backing vocals (track 4), horns (track 10)
- Tony Bevilacqua – horns (track 10)
- Additional backing vocals by: Carol Hatchett, Kira Dacosta, Brody "Queen Bee" Dalle, Kim "Koko Bubbles" Martinelli, Kat Von D. and Erin Smith

== Charts ==
| Chart (2008) | Peak position |
|---|---|
| Australian Albums (ARIA) | 40 |
| Belgian Albums (Ultratop Flanders) | 59 |
| Belgian Alternative Albums (Ultratop Flanders) | 24 |
| Dutch Albums (Album Top 100) | 90 |
| Dutch Alternative Albums (MegaCharts) | 18 |
| French Albums (SNEP) | 100 |
| Scottish Albums (Official Charts) | 81 |
| Swiss Albums (Schweizer Hitparade) | 97 |
| UK Albums (Official Charts) | 91 |
| US Billboard 200 | 57 |
| US Independent Albums (Billboard) | 3 |
