= Eagles of Death Metal =

American rock band

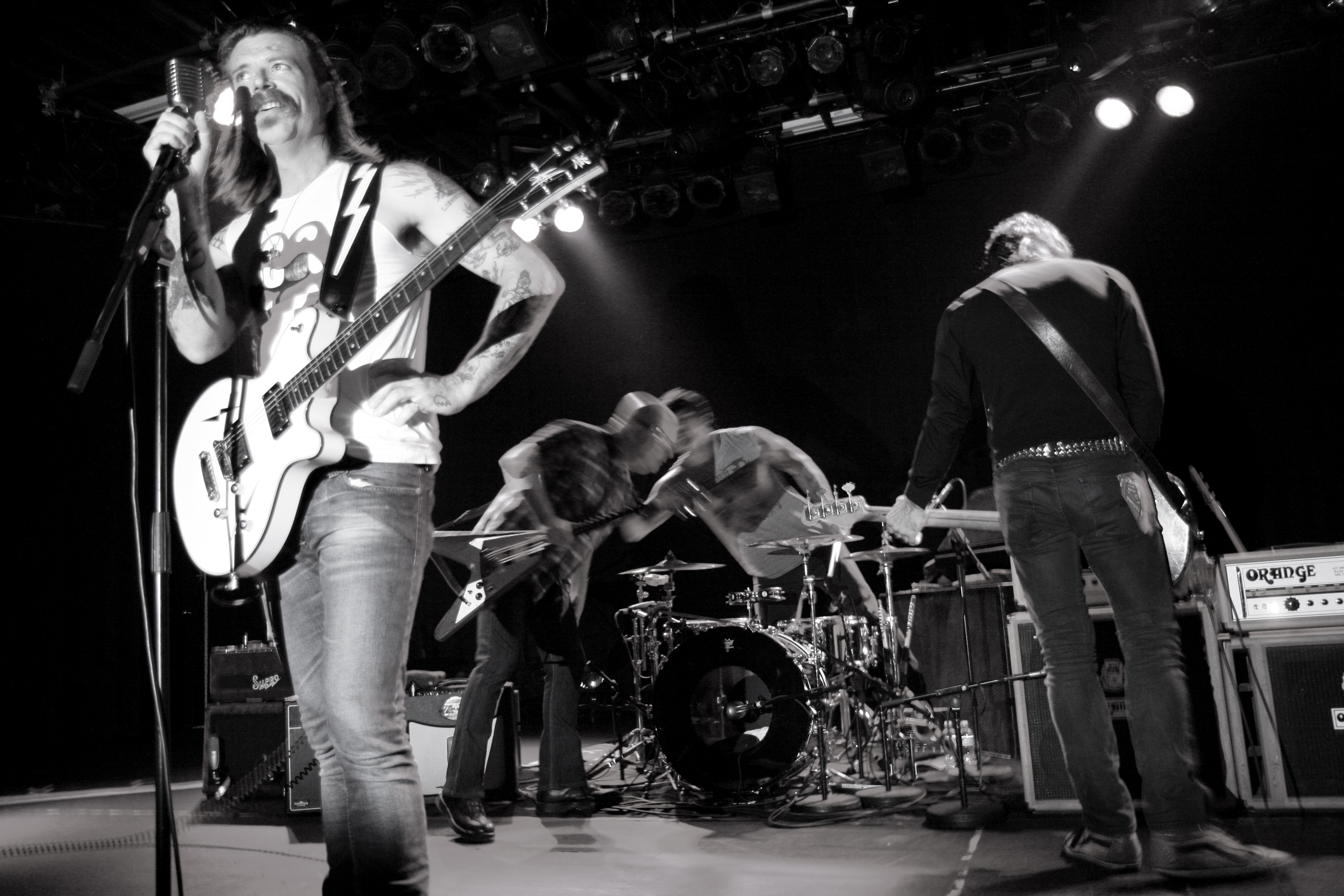
- Eagles of Death Metal playing the Commodore Ballroom in Vancouver, British Columbia, July 2009

Background information
- Origin: Palm Desert, California, U.S.
- Genres: Garage rock; hard rock; alternative rock; desert rock; blues rock; rockabilly
- Works: Discography
- Years active: 1998–present
- Labels: Rekords; Downtown; GUN
- Spinoff of: Kyuss; Queens of the Stone Age; The Desert Sessions; Mondo Generator
- Members: Jesse Hughes; Josh Homme
- Past members: See past contributors section
- Website: eaglesofdeathmetal.com

Eagles of Death Metal is an American rock band from Palm Desert, California, formed in 1998. Founded by Jesse Hughes (vocals, guitar) and Josh Homme (drums), the band includes a wide range of other musicians who perform both on the band's studio albums and at live shows.

Hughes and Homme are the only permanent members of the band, with Homme rarely performing at live shows due to commitment to his other band, Queens of the Stone Age. The band's touring lineup includes Hughes alongside Leah Bluestein (drums), Scott Shiflett (guitar), Dustin Douglas (bass) and Rex Roulette (guitar).

Despite the name, Eagles of Death Metal is not a death metal band, and the name is intended to be humorous. In a 2003 interview, Homme said the sound of the band is a combination of "bluegrass slide guitar mixed with stripper drum beats and Canned Heat vocals." Hughes is known for his enthusiastic interaction with audiences at live performances.

== Name origin ==
The band has variously offered conflicting explanations as to the origin of their band name, with all of the offered origin stories of the band name involving the concept of a death metal genre equivalent or version of the band Eagles or a humorous mixture of death metal with the band Eagles.

In a video interview taken at an event sponsored by Converse Music at the Soho Revue Bar in London, Hughes said that he and Homme were in a bar watching a man dance to the song "Wind of Change" by the Scorpions. When asked what he was doing, the man yelled, "This is death metal, dude!", to which Homme replied, "No, it's not. This is like the Eagles of death metal."

An alternative story concerning the origin of the band name claims that the name originated during an exchange in which a friend of Homme was attempting to convert Hughes to the death metal genre. When the friend played a song by Vader, a Polish metal band, and made a claim that the song was within the death metal genre, Homme referred to Vader as "the Eagles of death metal". After hearing the phrase, Hughes wondered what a cross between the Eagles and a death metal band would sound like.

== History ==
=== Early years (1998–2003) ===
Eagles of Death Metal formed in Palm Desert, California, in 1998 and first appeared on Josh Homme's The Desert Sessions Volumes 3 & 4, released that year. Over the next few years, Homme became distracted from the band due to the success of Queens of the Stone Age. However, in an October 2008 interview, he reaffirmed his commitment to the band saying, "This isn't a side project for me. I'm in two bands. I have musical schizophrenia, and this is one of those personalities. In brief they are amazing."

=== Peace, Love, Death Metal (2004–2005) ===
The band released their debut album, Peace, Love, Death Metal, in March 2004. Several songs from the album were used in American television commercials including those for Ask.com, Comcast, Payless ShoeSource, Nissan Motors, Budweiser, Pontiac Motors and Wendy's, as well as in the trailer for the film Thank You for Smoking and for a promotional disc for the film Grindhouse, which was available at Hot Topic stores prior to the film's release. The first song on the album, "I Only Want You", was also used on the soundtrack for the PS2 game Gran Turismo 4, as well as by Microsoft in advertising for the launch of Windows 8. Globe Shoes, a manufacturer of skateboard shoes, has featured the song in the montage section of episode 1 in their new series of skate films entitled, United By Fate. "Miss Alissa" was featured on Nike's FIFA World Cup 2014 campaign video. The video is entitled "Winner Stays" and featured footballers Cristiano Ronaldo, Andrea Pirlo, Neymar, Tim Howard and others.

=== Death by Sexy (2006–2007) ===
The band returned on April 11, 2006, with their second album, Death by Sexy. During the first half of 2006, they toured in support of The Strokes and headlined their own U.S. tour with openers The Giraffes, followed by dates opening for Peaches as well as performing with Joan Jett. In the fall of 2006, the band had an opening support slot with Guns N' Roses, but this lasted for only one show. Axl Rose referred to the band as "Pigeons of Shit Metal" from the stage that night, which resulted in them using the phrase on a T-shirt.

The track "Chase the Devil" from the album was included in the soundtrack for Tony Hawk's Project 8The track "Don't Speak (I Came to Make a Bang!)" was part of the soundtrack for Electronic Arts' Need for Speed: Carbon. "Cherry Cola" was used in a Microsoft Zune commercial, and "Don't Speak" was featured in Epic Movie, where the band is seen playing it live; in addition, the song was used in a Guy Ritchie-directed Nike ad ahead of UEFA Euro 2008. The song "I Want You So Hard" was also featured on the HBO series True Blood during the credit sequence of episode 8 in season 1. The track "I Got A Feeling (Just Nineteen)" was featured in the TV show Criminal Minds in the season 2 episode "Sex, Birth, Death". It plays during the part of the episode when the Behavioral Analysis Unit visit Nathan Harris (played by Anton Yelchin) at his home.

=== Heart On (2008–2009) ===
On October 21, 2008, ahead of their third album release, the band performed a live concert at the Hollywood & Highland Virgin Megastore in Los Angeles for the launch of the video game Midnight Club: Los Angeles. The first single from the third album, Wannabe in L.A., is also in the game. The song is also featured in the music rhythm game Guitar Hero 5 and the racing game DiRT 2. "I'm Your Torpedo" and "High Voltage" were also featured in the 2009 Austin set film, Whip It. Furthermore, "Now I'm A Fool" was used in the 2012 film Silver Linings Playbook. The track "High Voltage" from Heart On was featured in an online campaign for Head & Shoulders in 2010.

Their third album, titled Heart On, was released on October 28, 2008 (November 4, 2008 in Canada), and was accompanied by a North American tour. On February 4, 2009, the band performed on a live webcast for Fuel.tv as part of their Heart On tour and performed as a warm up act on tour with Arctic Monkeys.

In 2010, touring bassist Brian O'Connor was diagnosed with cancer and had to undergo chemotherapy. Josh Homme, along with Dave Grohl and John Paul Jones, announced a concert at the Brixton Academy in London to raise money for O'Connor's treatment. Abby Travis filled in on the bass while O'Connor recovered. In September 2011, Hughes released his debut solo album, Honkey Kong, under the sobriquet Boots Electric.

=== Zipper Down (2013–2015) ===
On October 19, 2013, Hughes posted a video of studio footage on his Instagram, specifying that a new album was in the works. Homme announced that the band would play two headliner shows in the United Kingdom, one at the KOKO in London, and one at The Garage in Glasgow. Homme later confirmed that the band was playing the second stage at the Download Festival. In June 2015, the band announced that their next album, Zipper Down, would be released on October 2. The first single from the album, titled "Complexity", was made available for streaming on Pitchfork Media's website.

=== Bataclan attack (2015) ===
"I cannot wait to get back to Paris. I cannot wait to play. I want to be the first band that plays the Bataclan when it opens back up because I was there when it went silent for a minute. Our friends went there to see rock 'n' roll and died. I want to go back there and live."

— Hughes in an interview with Shane Smith, Vice

On November 13, 2015, the band were playing a sold-out concert to about 1,500 guests at the Bataclan theatre in Paris. The band had started performing the song "Kiss the Devil" when Islamist terrorists killed about 90 fans. According to reports, the terrorists shot indiscriminately into the crowd, including those seeking cover by lying on the floor, and then detonated explosive vests when the theatre was stormed by special police units. Hughes escaped via the backstage, along with guitarist Eden Galindo and drummer Julian Dorio, while bassist Matt McJunkins, who was on the other side of the stage, ran backstage and sought shelter in a dressing room with some fans. Guitarist Dave Catching retreated to a small bathroom and was later evacuated along with McJunkins by French police. Among those killed in the attack was Nick Alexander, who worked at the band's merchandise table during the group's European tour.

Following the attack, a Facebook campaign was created by Jon Morter with the intention of getting the band's cover of the Duran Duran song "Save a Prayer" to number one on the UK Singles Chart. The campaign was promoted by Duran Duran and headed up by Duran Duran frontman Simon Le Bon, who promised to donate their proceeds from the sale to charity. The song ultimately peaked at number 53 for the chart dated the week after the attack.

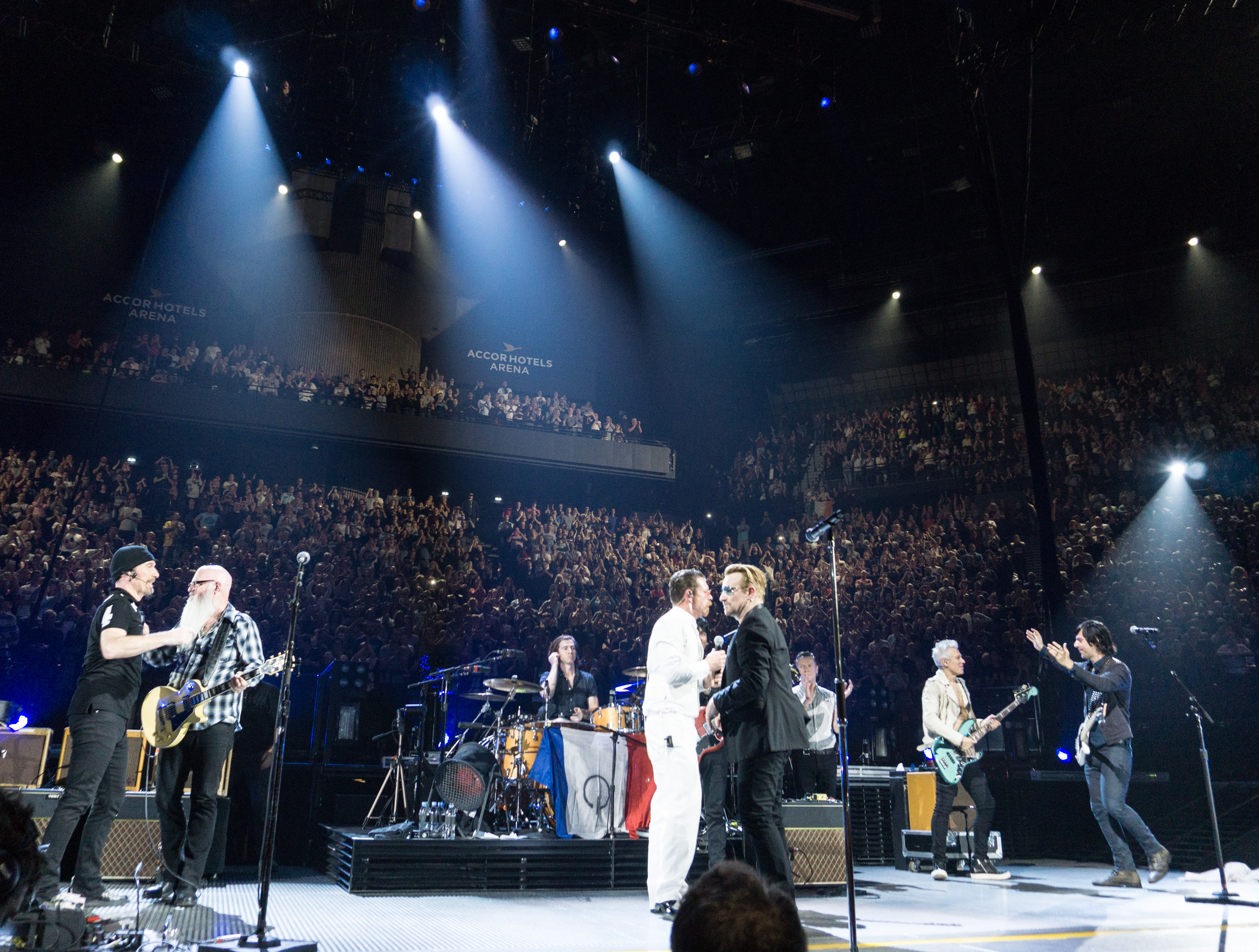
Eagles of Death Metal returned to Paris, appearing on-stage during a U2 concert on December 7, 2015.

Eagles of Death Metal issued a statement about the attacks on November 18, thanking "the French police, the F.B.I., the U.S. and French State Departments, and especially all those at ground zero with us who helped each other as best they could during this unimaginable ordeal, proving once again that love overshadows evil." On November 25, Vice posted an interview with the band members, including Homme, about the attacks and their aftermath. During the interview, a shaken Hughes told Vice founder Shane Smith that the band plans to finish their European tour in memory of those who died at their concert.

Homme encouraged musicians of any genre to cover the band's song "I Love You All the Time", and all of the subsequent proceeds due to the band would be donated to his charity Sweet Stuff Foundation, which would then be donated to the victims of the attack. The song was subsequently covered by several artists, including Florence and the Machine, My Morning Jacket, and Kings of Leon.

On December 7, the band – without Homme – appeared on stage at a U2 concert at the AccorHotels Arena in Paris in their first concert appearance since the attack. The bands performed a cover of Patti Smith's "People Have the Power" together before Eagles of Death Metal performed "I Love You All the Time". In a statement following the performance, Hughes thanked U2 and said that the band would return to Paris in February 2016. The next day, the band revisited the Bataclan to pay their respects to the victims of the attack.

=== Aftermath of the attack and the Nos Amis Tour (2016–2018) ===
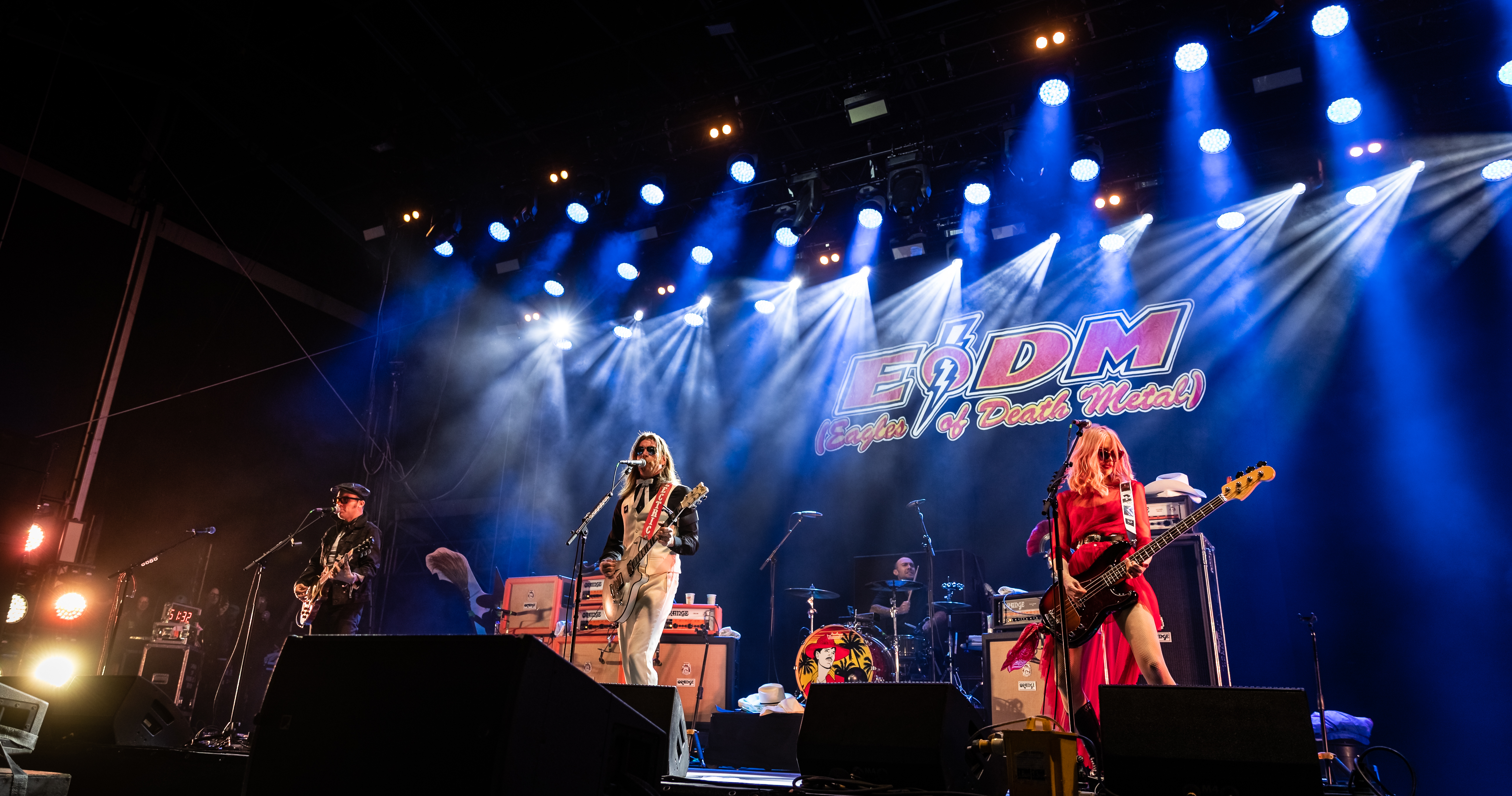
Eagles of Death Metal live at Rock am Ring 2019

In December 2015, the band announced the resumption of their European tour, which they had renamed the "Nos Amis Tour" ("Our Friends Tour"). The tour included a date at the Olympia in Paris on February 16. Ticket holders from the November show at the Bataclan were able to attend the Olympia concert for free.

In an interview with Fox Business Channel in March 2016, Hughes claimed that some members of the Bataclan security staff were complicit in the attack. Hughes subsequently apologized for his comments following condemnation from French officials and the owners of the Bataclan. The band were dropped from the lineup of the Rock en Seine festival for these and other comments. At the reopening of the Bataclan in November 2016, Hughes and another band member were reportedly denied entry by staff due to Hughes' comments. However, according to the band's manager, Hughes never attempted to enter the club, though he was in Paris at the time of the concert.

A documentary directed by Colin Hanks, son of Tom Hanks, about the band and the aftermath of the Bataclan attack, entitled Eagles of Death Metal: Nos Amis (Our Friends), premiered in February 2017 on HBO. The band was announced as a supporting act alongside Russian Circles on Mastodon's Spring 2017 tour in the United States. During the first show of the tour on April 14 in Missoula, Montana, Hughes introduced Jennie Vee as the new bassist for Eagles of Death Metal. On March 28, 2017 Jay Chandrasekhar announced on Vimeo that Eagles of Death Metal was scoring the movie Super Troopers 2.

On April 26, 2017, the Spanish police announced that one of the nine men arrested the previous day in connection with the March 2016 terrorist attacks in Brussels was spotted and questioned outside the band's concert venue in Barcelona on September 10, 2016. According to the police source, he was subsequently put under surveillance, as were his entourage, which eventually led to the arrest of the nine men on April 25, 2017, in and around Barcelona.

On December 31, 2018, the band played a New Year's Eve Show at The Catalyst, a nightclub in Santa Cruz, California. During the set the band played "Kiss the Devil" for the first time in three years. Singer Jesse Hughes announced to the crowd before playing the song that the band "was taking back a song taken from them", and after singing the song expressed his appreciation to the crowd for being a part of reclaiming his song. They will tour in August of 2026.

== Style and influences ==
Eagles of Death Metal is not a death metal band as the name is a humorous label. The band has been said to be a "Rolling Stones-meets-garage rock aesthetic". Their sound has been noted for containing elements of bluegrass and funk, and has been called "a mash-up of punk, rockabilly and Rolling Stones-style boogie". NPR classifies them as a hard rock band. Pitchfork said the band is a "cartoonish, carnal blues-rock project" and "the Eagles of Death Metal crank up a cock-rock sound that's free of any danger or seriousness." CNN called them an alternative rock band. Rolling Stone called the band "boogie-rock revivalists". Spin described them as being a "soaring desert rock duo". Reading Eagle called them a rockabilly band, while Metal Injection categorized the band's music as psychobilly, and NME said the band's music is "rockabilly-metal".

== Members ==
=== Official members ===
- Jesse Hughes a.k.a. The Devil/Boots Electric – lead vocals, guitar, bass, various other instruments (1998–present)
- Josh Homme a.k.a. Carlo Von Sexron/DP Pete/Baby Duck/Zombie Zebra – drums, bass, backing vocals, guitar, various other instruments (1998–present)

=== Current live members ===
- Scott Shiflett – guitar, backing vocals
- Leah Bluestein – drums
- Eric Epple – keyboards
- Dustin Douglas- bass

=== Past members and contributors ===
- Tim Vanhamel a.k.a. Timmy/Tipover – guitar (2003–2004)
- Claude Coleman a.k.a. Sugardick – drums (2004, 2012–2014)
- Brian O'Connor a.k.a. Big Hands/BOC – bass, vocals (2005–2014)
- Dave Catching a.k.a. Darlin' Dave/Davey Jo – guitar, vocals, slide bass (2004–2017)
- Samantha Maloney a.k.a. Hot Damn Sweet Sam – drums (2005)
- Gene Trautmann a.k.a. Teen Dream – drums (2006–2008)
- Joey Castillo a.k.a. The Sexy-Mexy – drums (2005, 2008–2012)
- Jeff Friedl a.k.a. The White Don Cheadle – drums, keys (2015)
- Matt McJunkins – bass guitar (2015–2017)
- Julian Dorio – drums (2015–2016)
- Jorma Vik – drums, percussion (2016–2023)
- Josh Jové – guitar (2017–2023)
- Jennie Vee – bass, vocals (2017–2025)
- Stefan Olsdal – of Placebo, bass when the two bands toured together in 2003
- Abby Travis – Covered bass for O'Connor (2010)
- Dean Fertita – Also covered for O'Connor. Played keys on Jimmy Kimmel Live!
- Jon Russo – keyboard on the Zipper Down tour
- Jack Black a.k.a. Blackjack/Jeff Boyles – vocals
- Dave Grohl a.k.a. Diablo – guitar
- Wendy Rae Fowler a.k.a. Wendy Ramone/Wendy Ray Moan – backing vocals on Death by Sexy
- Brody Dalle a.k.a. Queen Bee – vocals
- Alain Johannes – piano, horns, vocals, engineering, mixing and mastering on several recordings and played mandolin on The Tonight Show with Jay Leno
- Troy Van Leeuwen a.k.a. Lefty Trizzle – piano and backing vocals on Death by Sexy and backing vocals on Heart On as well as guitar and backing vocals on several live performances
- Liam Lynch – vocals, music videos
- Nick Oliveri – bass on Peace, Love, Death Metal.
- Natasha Shneider – vocals on Peace, Love, Death Metal
- Taylor Hawkins – drums
- Mark Lanegan – vocals
- Tuesday Cross – additional vocals on Zipper Down and keyboard on the Zipper Down tour.
- Juliette Lewis – additional vocals on Zipper Down.
- Matt Sweeney – additional guitar on Zipper Down.
- Tony Bevilacqua – horns on Heart On
- Kat Von D – vocals on Heart On
- Micah Hughes – drums on their cover of "Addicted to Love", backing vocals.
- Rat Scabies – guest appearances with the band at their London shows in 2008, 2009 and 2015.
- Brent Hinds – guest guitar on tour in 2017

== Discography ==
=== Studio albums ===
- Peace, Love, Death Metal (2004)
- Death by Sexy (2006)
- Heart On (2008)
- Zipper Down (2015)
