= Death by Sexy =

Studio album by Eagles of Death Metal
- Released: April 11, 2006
- Recorded: January 2005
- Studios: Studio B at Sound City Studios, Van Nuys, California
- Genres: Garage rock; alternative rock; blues rock; rockabilly
- Length: 38:48
- Label: Downtown (DWT 70001)
- Producer: Josh Homme

Eagles of Death Metal chronology
Peace, Love, Death Metal (2004)	Death by Sexy (2006)	Heart On (2008)

Singles from Death by Sexy
- 1. "I Want You So Hard (Boy's Bad News)" Released: April 10, 2006; 2. "I Gotta Feelin (Just Nineteen)" Released: November 20, 2006

Death by Sexy is the second album by the American rock group Eagles of Death Metal. It was rumored to be released in summer 2005 but was pushed back to be released in the United States on April 11, 2006. It was released in Europe on July 3, 2006.

The album cover of Death by Sexy has elements similar to the covers of The Rolling Stones' 1971 album Sticky Fingers, Mötley Crüe's 1981 album Too Fast For Love, and Loverboy's 1981 album Get Lucky.

The track "Don't Speak (I Came to Make a Bang!)" was featured in a 2008 Nike commercial directed by Guy Ritchie, which included the likes of Zlatan Ibrahimović, Cristiano Ronaldo, Cesc Fàbregas, and Ronaldinho. It is also featured in the 2006 video game Need for Speed: Carbon, as well as the films Epic Movie and Supergirl, and the trailer for the 2010 film, The Losers.

The track "Chase the Devil" is featured in the 2006 video game Tony Hawk's Project 8.

== Critical reception ==
Professional ratings
Review scores
Source	Rating
AllMusic	4/5 stars
The Guardian	2/5 stars
Pitchfork	7.3/10
PopMatters	4/5 stars
Rolling Stone	3/5 stars
Spin	3/5 stars
Uncut	May 2006, p.105

In a similar vein to its predecessor, Death by Sexy received mostly positive reviews, earning a rating of 72 out of 100 on Metacritic. Uncut and AllMusic both gave the album four stars out of five, with the latter calling it "thoroughly trashy fun". Rolling Stone agreed, stating that at the album's high points "the sexy propulsion could light up a bar, or a strip club" though conceded that the band's debut was "slightly hookier". Some reviewers weren't so enthusiastic, with The Guardian likening the band "to how Electric Six would sound if they were drinking tepid water instead of vodka" and giving the album two stars.

== Track listing ==
All tracks by Jesse Hughes and Josh Homme

No.	Title	Length
1.	"I Want You So Hard (Boy's Bad News)"	2:21
2.	"I Got a Feelin (Just Nineteen)"	3:30
3.	"Cherry Cola"	3:17
4.	"I Like to Move in the Night"	3:59
5.	"Solid Gold"	4:20
6.	"Don't Speak (I Came to Make a BANG!)"	2:47
7.	"Keep Your Head Up"	2:27
8.	"The Ballad of Queen Bee and Baby Duck"	1:59
9.	"Poor Doggie"	3:16
10.	"Chase the Devil"	3:02
11.	"Eagles Goth"	1:59
12.	"Shasta Beast"	2:26
13.	"Bag O' Miracles"	2:19

The European version contains 15 tracks:

- Track 14 has a duration of 4 seconds, consists of a trumpet and a voice saying "Bonus track for Europe", the intro to...
- Track 15, "Nasty Notion" 3:11.

There's a special tour edition with three extra tracks: - "Beat on the Brat" (Ramones cover) - "Addicted to Love" (Robert Palmer cover) - "High Voltage Rock 'n' Roll" (AC/DC cover)

== Personnel ==
- Jesse Hughes – lead vocals, guitar, acoustic guitar on "Solid Gold" and percussion on "Bag O' Miracles"
- Josh Homme – drums, backup vocals, keyboards on "I Want You So Hard", bass on all tracks except "Eagles Goth", "Don't Speak" and "I Gotta Feeling", guitar on "Solid Gold" and "Eagles Goth", lead guitar on "Cherry Cola"
- Joey Castillo – drums on "I Want You So Hard", "Shasta Beast" and "Chase the Devil", percussion on "Solid Gold"
- David Catching – lead guitar on "I Like to Move in the Night" and "Don't Speak" Slide guitar on "Chase the Devil" Guitar on “Eagles Goth”
- Brian O'Connor – backup vocals on "I Want You So Hard" and "Poor Doggie", bass on "I Gotta Feeling", "I Like to Move in the Night", "Don't Speak" and "Eagles Goth"
- Troy Van Leeuwen – piano on "I Like to Move in the Night", backup vocals on "Poor Doggie"
- Brody Dalle – backup vocals on "I Gotta Feeling", "I Like to Move in the Night", "Cherry Cola", "The Ballad of Queen Bee and Baby Duck" and "Poor Doggie"
- Mark Lanegan – backup vocals on "I Gotta Feeling", "I Like to Move in the Night" and "Poor Doggie"
- Liam Lynch – backup vocals on "I Like to Move in the Night", "The Ballad of Queen Bee and Baby Duck" and "Poor Doggie"
- Wendy Rae Fowler (Wendy Ray Moan) – backup vocals on "I Like to Move in the Night" and "The Ballad of Queen Bee and Baby Duck"
- Jack Black – backup vocals on "I Want You So Hard" and "Don't Speak"

== Charts ==
Chart	Peak position
Belgian Albums (Ultratop Flanders)	98
Dutch Midprice Albums (MegaCharts)	50
French Albums (SNEP)	169
German Albums (Offizielle Top 100)	60
UK Albums (OCC)	108
US Billboard 200	113
US Heatseekers Albums (Billboard)	1
US Independent Albums (Billboard)	11
