= Josh Homme =

American musician (born 1973)

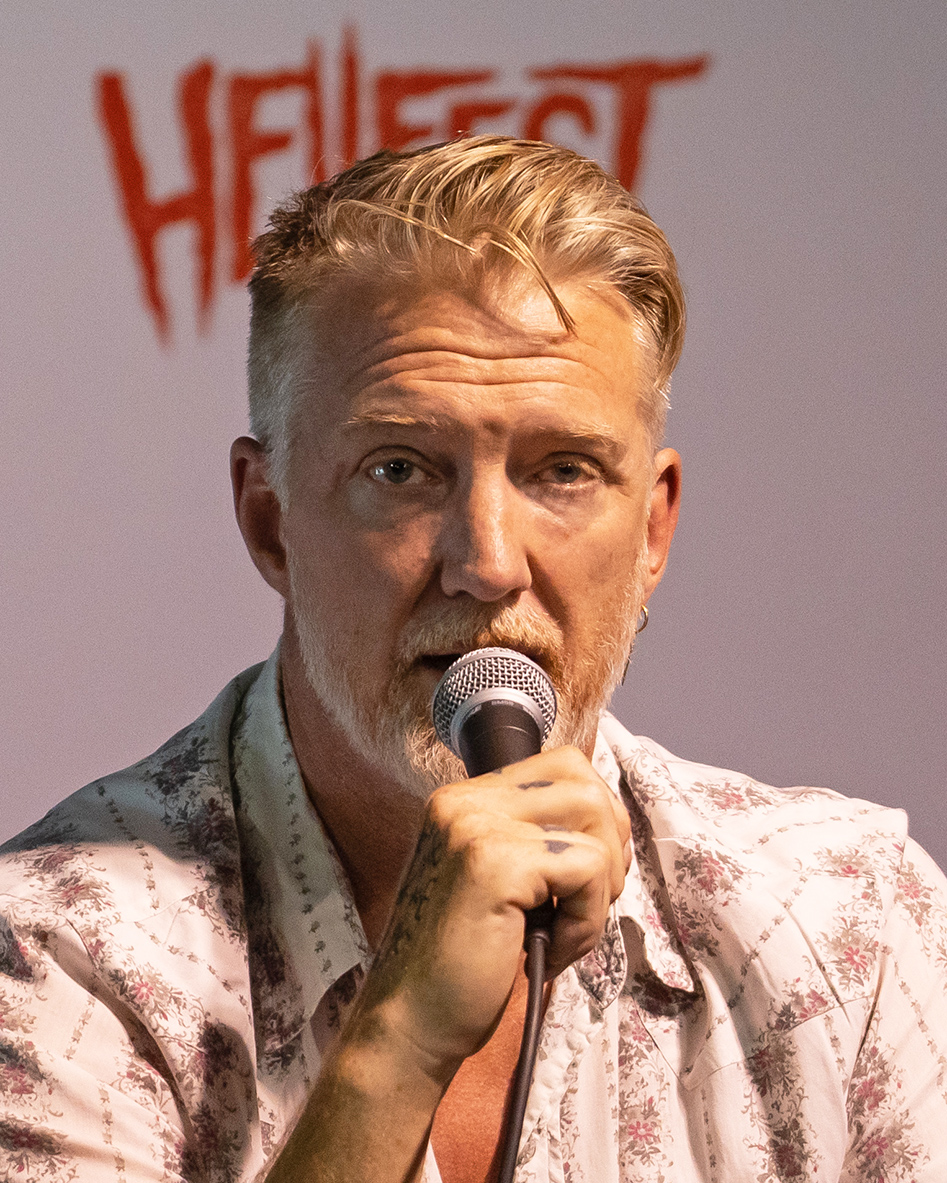
- Homme at Hellfest in 2024
- Born: Joshua Michael Homme III; May 17, 1973 (age 53); Palm Springs, California, U.S.
- Other names: Baby Duck; Carlo Von Sexron; J.Ho; Töôrnst Hülpft; Ginger Elvis
- Occupations: Musician; singer; songwriter; record producer
- Years active: 1985–present
- Spouse: Brody Dalle (m. 2005; sep. 2019)
- Children: 3
- Musical career
- Origin: Palm Desert, California, U.S.
- Genres: Alternative rock; desert rock; stoner rock; hard rock
- Instruments: Vocals; guitar; bass; keyboards; drums
- Works: Discography
- Labels: Beggars Banquet; Bongload; Chameleon; Dali; Elektra; Interscope; Ipecac; Loosegroove; Southern Lord; Matador; Rekords; Roadrunner; Man's Ruin
- Member of: Queens of the Stone Age; Eagles of Death Metal; The Desert Sessions; Them Crooked Vultures; Fififf Teeners
- Formerly of: Kyuss; Screaming Trees; Mondo Generator; Sound City Players

Joshua Michael Homme III (/ˈhɒmi/ HOM-ee; born May 17, 1973) is an American musician, singer-songwriter, multi-instrumentalist, and record producer. He is best known as the founder and only continuous member of the rock band Queens of the Stone Age, which he formed in 1996 shortly after the breakup of his previous band Kyuss. Homme is the band's primary songwriter and mainly sings lead vocals and plays guitar. He also plays drums in the rock band Eagles of Death Metal, which he co-founded in 1998.

Homme began his career as the co-founder and guitarist of the rock band Kyuss, with whom he performed from 1987 to 1995. He then served as a touring guitarist for the rock band Screaming Trees from 1996 to 1998, leaving to start Queens of the Stone Age. He has also overseen a musical improv project with other musicians (mostly from the Palm Desert Scene) known as The Desert Sessions since 1997.

He formed the supergroup Them Crooked Vultures alongside Dave Grohl and John Paul Jones in 2009, releasing their eponymous debut album later that year. In 2016, he produced, co-wrote, and performed on the Iggy Pop album Post Pop Depression. He has also been involved with acts such as Royal Blood, Foo Fighters, Run the Jewels, and Arctic Monkeys.

== Early life ==
Joshua Michael Homme III was born in Palm Springs, California, on May 17, 1973. He grew up in Palm Desert, California; his paternal grandfather, Clancy "Cap" Homme, was an early settler of the area. Cap has a private street named after him in Rancho Mirage, marking the original road to the Homme ranch, as well as a park named after him in an exclusive enclave of the Valley. Homme said he had to "create [his] own fun" as a child growing up in the desert, stating that he did not start playing music to "get girls or make money" and that he assumed he would grow up to be a contractor like his father.

Homme also has ties in Idaho and has talked about his formative experiences there, such as seeing Carl Perkins perform at the Sandpoint Music Festival and the first time purchasing his own electric guitar (an Ovation Ultra GP) in a Sandpoint music store.

He began playing guitar at the age of nine, after his parents denied his wishes for a drum kit. He took guitar lessons for the next few years but his teacher mostly focused on polka, so he supposedly did not learn of a barre chord or a pick until his third year of lessons, lending to his unique playing style. He joined his first band, Autocracy, in 1985 at the age of 12. Despite his musical success, he continued to work on his grandfather's farm until releasing the first Queens of the Stone Age album at the age of 25, because he "didn't want to lose [his] grip on reality".

== Career ==
=== Kyuss (1987–1995) ===
In 1987, when he was 14 years old, Homme formed a punk rock-influenced heavy metal band in Palm Desert High School called Katzenjammer with schoolmates John Garcia, Brant Bjork, Nick Oliveri and Chris Cockrell. Homme was the band's guitarist. After changing their name a few times, first to Sons of Kyuss (they released an EP of the same name), they finally shortened it to Kyuss. The band garnered a cult following by the early 1990s, often driving for hours to isolated locations in the desert and plugging into generators to perform. These events, known as "generator parties", became an urban legend among rock subculture.

The band became both famous for their heavy, down tuned, groove oriented music, and infamous for their backstage fights with local LA bands when they traveled into town to play gigs. This soon brought the attention of Chris Goss, who became the band's mentor, helping the band sign to a label and eventually producing them exclusively in an effort to preserve their sound. Due to Homme being younger than 18 at the time of the band's signing, his parents signed the contract on his behalf. Kyuss released four albums (Wretch, Blues for the Red Sun, Welcome to Sky Valley, and ...And the Circus Leaves Town), of which the final three Goss-produced efforts are often cited as cornerstones to the development of the stoner rock genre in the 1990s.

=== Queens of the Stone Age (1996–present) ===
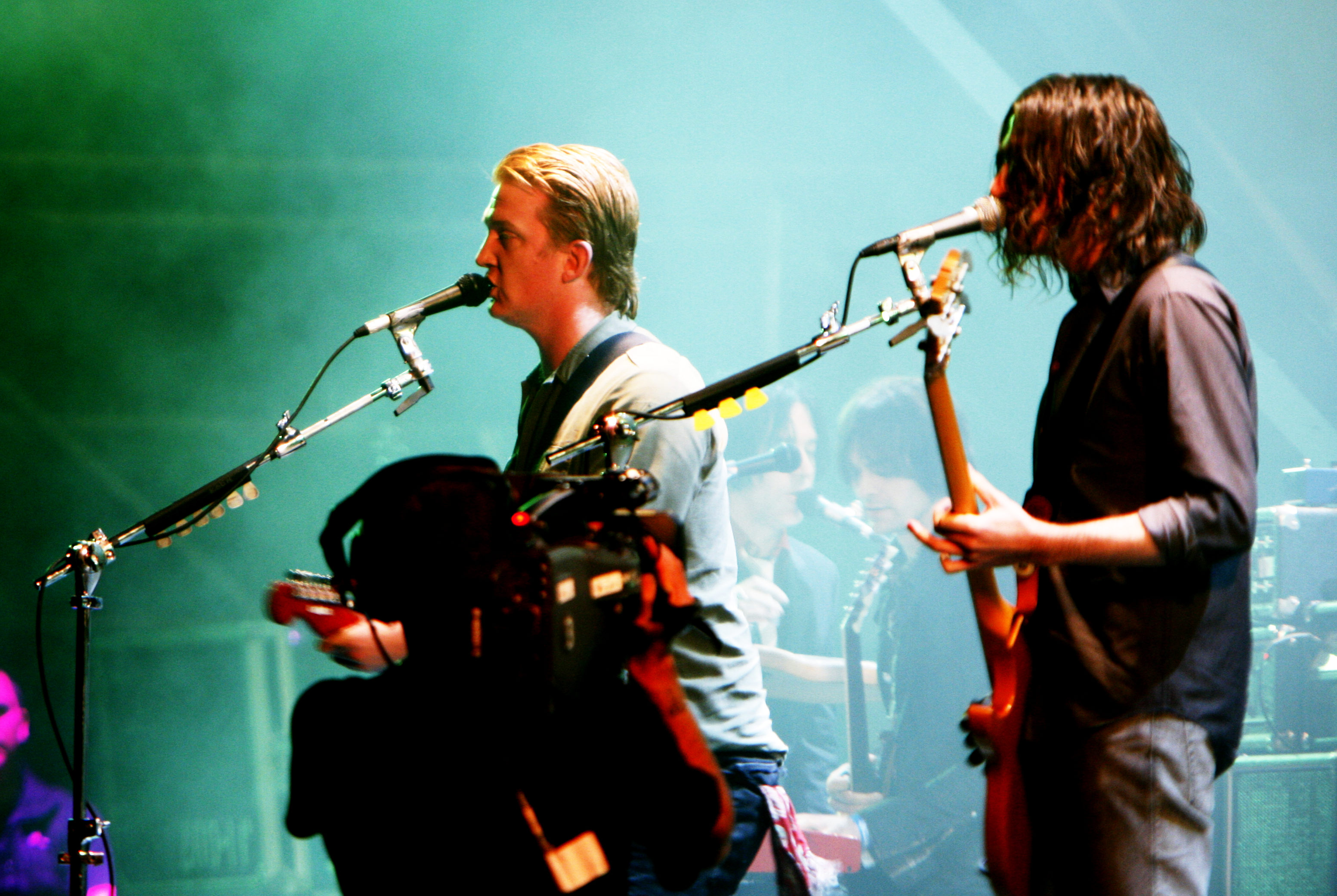
Queens of the Stone Age performing at the 2007 Eurockéennes; from left to right: Homme, Troy Van Leeuwen, Dean Fertita, Michael Shuman

When Kyuss split up in 1995, Homme moved to Seattle, Washington, briefly abandoning his desire for a music career and attending the Seattle Central College to study business. During this time, he fell back in with old musician friends such as Ben Shepherd and Mike Johnson, and eventually agreed to join the Screaming Trees as a rhythm guitarist on the summer Lollapalooza tour in 1996, a replacement for Johnson, and that continued into the following year.

Homme and vocalist Mark Lanegan became close friends during this time but, disliking the rest of the band's continual disharmony, began considering forming his own band. He founded Gamma Ray, a group more centered on his unique style and tastes, in 1996. After a cease and desist from a band of the same name, this band became Queens of the Stone Age.

Homme lived in a squat in Amsterdam's Spuistraat for several months in 1996, which set forth events that would help kickstart the band. Roadrunner Records approached Homme to contribute to the label's compilation Burn One Up! Music for Stoners, which led to the first Queens of the Stone Age song, "18 A.D.", written with Dave Catching featuring Catching and members of Dutch stoner rock band Beaver on bass and drums. Homme also produced a song by Beaver for the compilation.

The band's first release under the new name was the Kyuss/Queens of the Stone Age compilation EP, featuring tracks from both Kyuss and songs recorded from the Gamma Ray EP sessions from 1996, released in late 1997. Queens of the Stone Age released their eponymous debut album in 1998. Initially, the band consisted of various friends of Homme's from the Seattle area. Homme had asked a number of singers, including Lanegan, to perform as lead vocalist for Queens of the Stone Age, but by the time of recording the band's debut album, he had moved back to Palm Desert and the band was pared down to just Homme and ex-Kyuss drummer Alfredo Hernandez. Homme was left to cover every other instrument and ended up singing for the first time in his career. Shortly after recording, Homme and Hernandez were joined by bassist and vocalist Nick Oliveri and guitarist, keyboardist, and lapsteel player Dave Catching, the band was now composed entirely of ex-Kyuss members and roadies.

Following their debut album, by which time Hernandez left the group, Queens of the Stone Age released the next album, Rated R, during which the band used a wider range of instruments to achieve a more relaxed, spacious and psychedelic sound. Though it differed from the band's debut, Rated R became Queens of the Stone Age's first mainstream hit. The next release, 2002's Songs for the Deaf, however, would gain even more buzz from the music community and fans alike. In Songs for the Deaf, Homme continued his filtering of stoner rock and hard rock.

The album centers on Homme's memories of uncomfortable rides through the California desert, where he had performed in his days with Kyuss, and where there was little to do but listen to Spanish radio stations.

During this time, Homme had a falling out with Oliveri. Following the release of Songs for the Deaf, their relationship deteriorated until Homme fired Oliveri from the band in 2004. Homme reportedly strongly considered breaking up the band at this point.

Homme began writing the band's next album, Lullabies to Paralyze, named after a lyric from the Songs for the Deaf hidden track "Mosquito Song". Lullabies to Paralyze, created with Songs for the Deaf touring recruits Troy Van Leeuwen and Joey Castillo and collaborators and future recruits Alain Johannes and Natasha Shneider of Eleven, was a critical and commercial success, debuting at number five on the Billboard 200, QOTSA's best charting album on the Billboard 200 to date.

Queens of the Stone Age's fifth album, Era Vulgaris, was released in early June 2007 and received generally positive reviews from critics. Following the album's touring cycle, the band took a break to focus on individual projects, during which Homme continued to produce and create more records outside the band. This break would unintentionally turn into a six-year gap between albums.

In 2010, following his work with rock supergroup Them Crooked Vultures, Homme began performing more live shows with QOTSA. Following a deluxe reissue of Rated R, a 2011 re-release of their debut album and corresponding tour followed, featuring the album played front to back in the style in which it was recorded. This was the first time many of the songs had been performed live since the album's original release.

On June 4, 2013, after a tumultuous writing and recording process, Queens of the Stone Age released their sixth album, ...Like Clockwork, receiving high praise from critics, as well as topping the Billboard 200 charts. ...Like Clockwork highlights Homme's collaborative recording process and features guests such as Elton John, Dave Grohl, Alex Turner, Jake Shears, Trent Reznor, Mark Lanegan, Nick Oliveri and Brody Dalle.

Their seventh album, Villains, was released in August 2017. The album contains no collaborations other than being produced by Mark Ronson, marking the first time the band has released an album with no featured guests on it. In 2018, the band was featured on Revamp, a cover album containing various renditions of Elton John songs, on which they performed "Goodbye Yellow Brick Road". The band's eighth album, In Times New Roman..., was released in June 2023.

=== The Desert Sessions (1997–present) ===
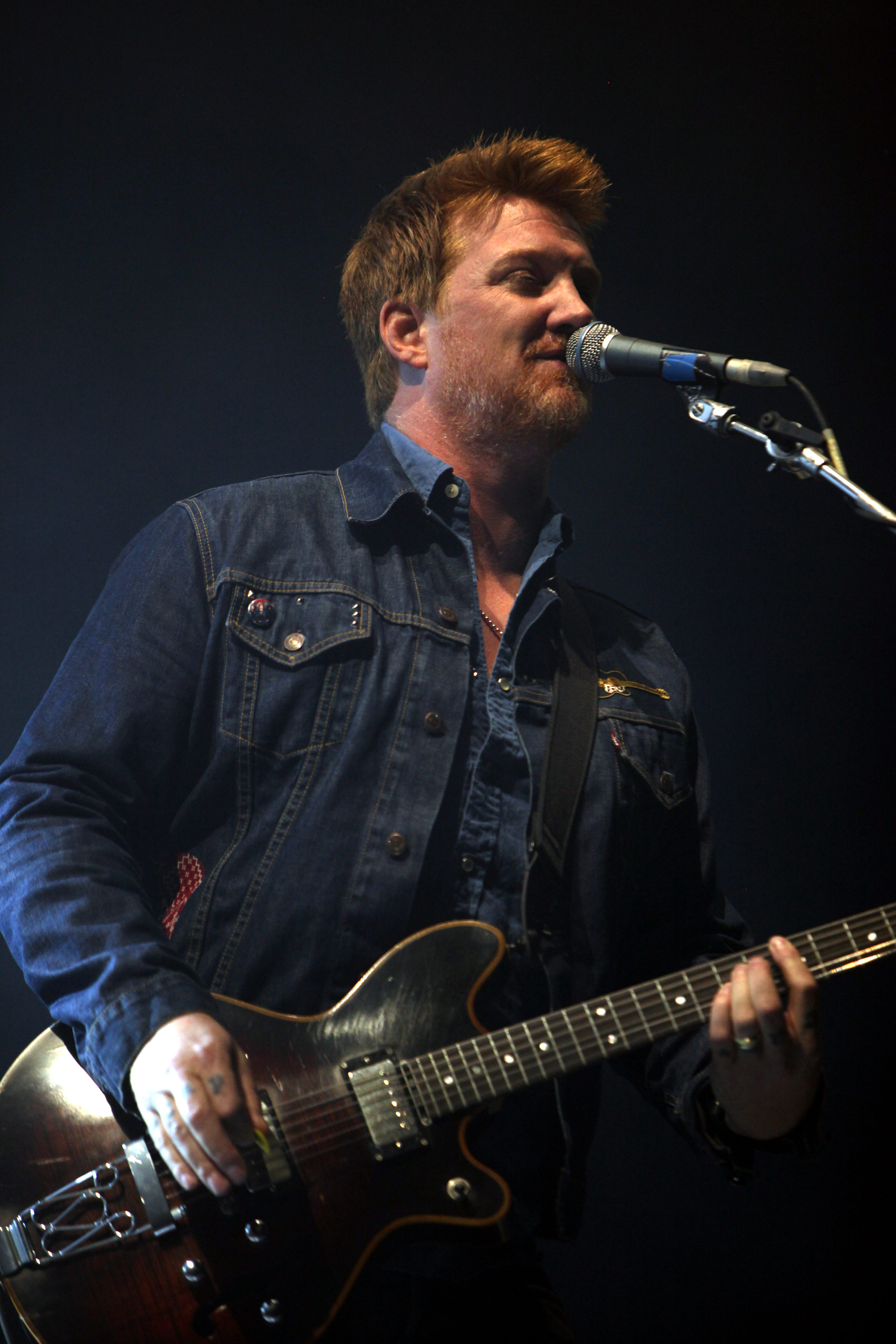
Homme performing at the 2011 Eurockéennes

Homme founded The Desert Sessions in 1997 at the Rancho De La Luna in Joshua Tree, California, describing it as a musical collective series "that cannot be defined". He stated, "At Desert Sessions, you play for the sake of music. That's why it's good for musicians. If someday that's not enough anymore, or that's not the reason behind you doing it – that's not your raison d'être – then a quick reminder like Desert Sessions can do so much for you, it's amazing. It's easy to forget that this all starts from playing in your garage and loving it."

The recordings are done "on the spot" in a matter of hours, and the line-up constantly changes, with new contributors being added for each new recording. Artists such as PJ Harvey, Twiggy Ramirez, Dave Catching, Nick Oliveri, Mark Lanegan, Ben Shepherd, John McBain, Josh Freese, Chris Goss, Alain Johannes, Dean Ween, and many others from the Palm Desert Scene have contributed to The Desert Sessions recordings.

After 11 years of inactivity, Homme revealed in October 2014 that he would start working on more Desert Sessions material the following year. However, things remained silent until May 2019, when Homme posted an image on Instagram with the hashtags "#Desert, #Sessions, #11, #12". In September, it was announced that Desert Sessions Volumes 11 & 12 will be released on October 25, 2019.

=== Eagles of Death Metal (1998–present) ===
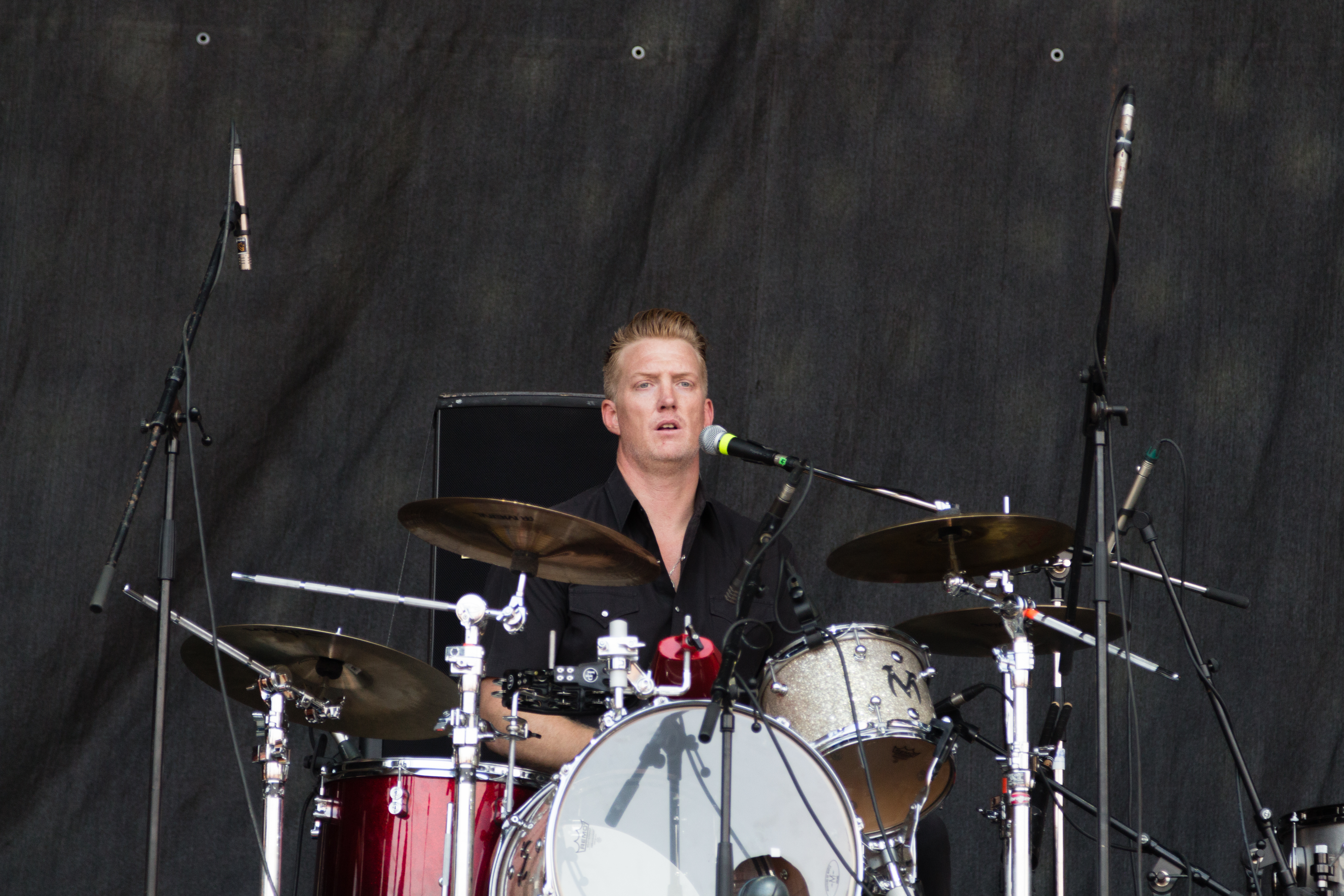
Homme playing drums with the Eagles of Death Metal in 2015

In 1998, Homme formed Eagles of Death Metal with friend Jesse Hughes as a joke band in the context of the Desert Sessions. Recordings from the band first appeared on Volumes 3 & 4, released that year. Over the next few years, Hughes settled into family life while Homme focused on Queens of the Stone Age. However, after Hughes' separation from his wife in 2003 and a spurt in creativity that resulted in dozens of songs, Homme convinced Hughes to pursue a full-time music career.

Hughes writes, sings, and plays rhythm guitar, while Homme produces, arranges, and plays drums, bass, and various other instruments. So far, the band has released four albums: Peace, Love, Death Metal in 2004, Death by Sexy in 2006, Heart On in 2008, and most recently Zipper Down in 2015. Due to his commitments with Queens of the Stone Age and other projects, Homme does not regularly tour with Eagles of Death Metal, but occasionally makes appearances during live performances. In an October 2008 interview, he re-affirmed his commitment to the band saying, "This isn't a side project for me. I'm in two bands. I have musical schizophrenia, and this is one of those personalities."

=== Them Crooked Vultures (2009–2010, 2022) ===
In July 2009, it was revealed that Homme, Dave Grohl and John Paul Jones were recording together for a musical project named Them Crooked Vultures. Though initially conceived as solely a studio project, the trio performed their first show together on August 9, 2009, in Chicago at The Metro to a crowd of approximately 1,100 ticketholders with additional live rhythm guitarist/auxiliary man Alain Johannes.

Their album, Them Crooked Vultures, was released by Interscope Records in the United States on November 17, 2009, and by Sony Music internationally. The band launched a world tour including performing on Saturday Night Live as a musical guest on February 6, 2010, and at Austin City Limits on October 2, 2009, as well as many festivals through 2010. Them Crooked Vultures won the Grammy Award for Best Hard Rock Performance at the 53rd Grammy Awards on February 13, 2011.

Though the band has been inactive for an extended period due to the schedules of its members' other projects, all three of members have expressed interest in returning to the project. On September 3, 2022, they reunited for a performance at Wembley Stadium in honour of Foo Fighters' late drummer Taylor Hawkins and again on September 27 at the KIA Forum for the second Hawkins tribute show. The band covered Elton John's "Goodbye Yellow Brick Road" and Queens of the Stone Age's "Long Slow Goodbye", and also played their songs "Gunman" and "Dead End Friends".

=== Other projects ===
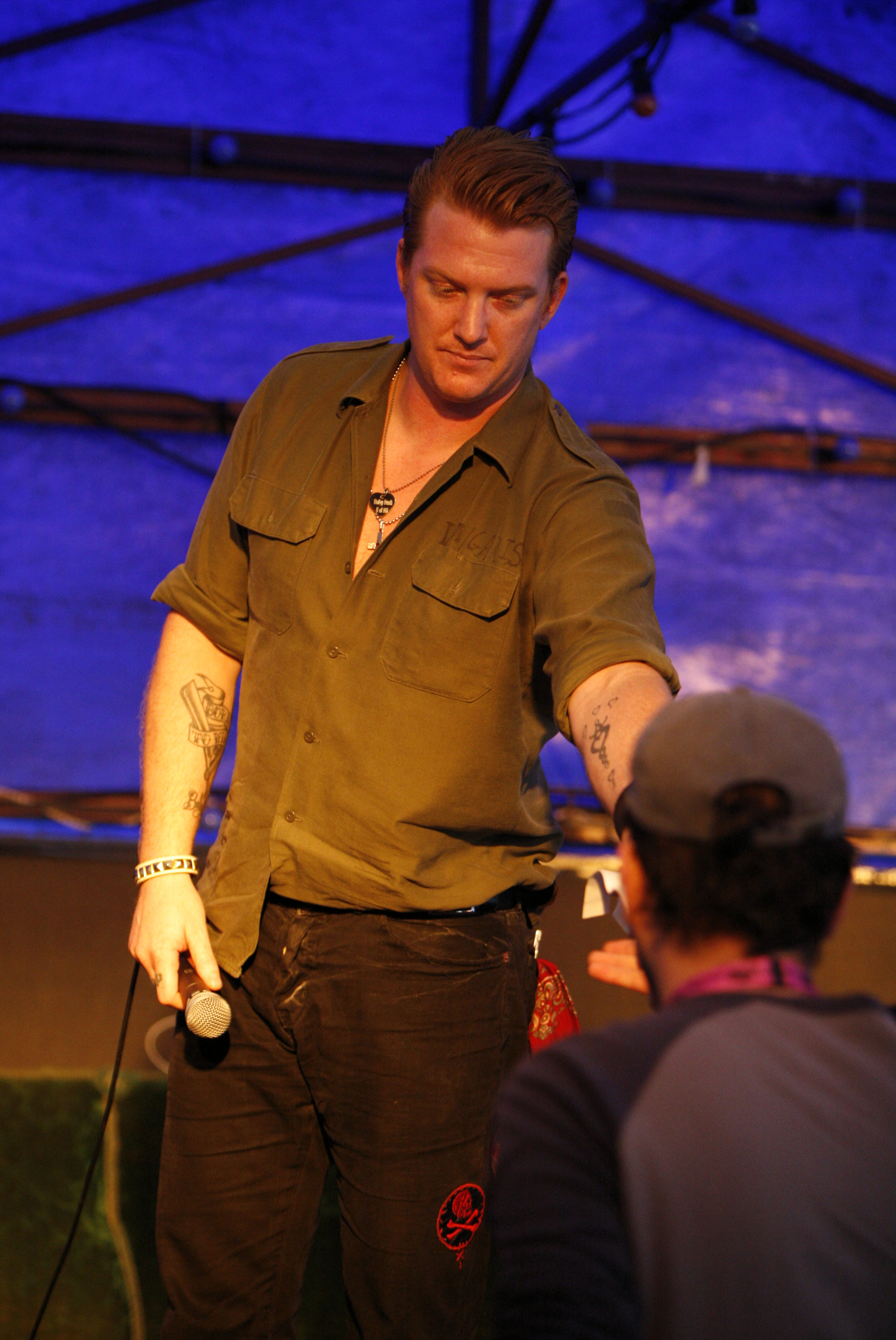
Homme in July 2007

Homme has collaborated with acts such as Mondo Generator, Foo Fighters, PJ Harvey, Fatso Jetson, Mark Lanegan Band, Trent Reznor, Masters of Reality, Millionaire, Wellwater Conspiracy, Unkle, Primal Scream, Melissa Auf der Maur, Paz Lenchantin, Run the Jewels, Death from Above 1979, Earthlings?, Mastodon, Peaches, Lady Gaga, The Strokes, Local H, Biffy Clyro, Royal Blood, and Arctic Monkeys.

Homme, Nick Oliveri, and Brad Wilk contributed to the soundtrack for the 2002 film The Dangerous Lives of Altar Boys. Homme and Alain Johannes were originally meant to develop a score for the video game Spec Ops in 2005, however the project was cancelled before it later became Spec Ops: The Line in 2012. His work on the game would go unused. Homme was also set to provide music, including a cover of Joe Walsh's "In the City", for the 2005 video game adaption of the film The Warriors. This also went unused.

Homme has been featured on compilation albums. He appeared on Killer Queen: A Tribute to Queen for a cover of the song "Stone Cold Crazy" alongside Eleven, as well as Rise Above: 24 Black Flag Songs to Benefit the West Memphis Three and the Turbonegro tribute Alpha Motherfuckers as part of QOTSA covering the song "Back to Dungaree High". The first use of the QOTSA name was on the compilation album Burn One Up! Music For Stoners featuring a one-off lineup of Homme and Dave Catching with Beaver members Milo Beenhakker and Eva Nahon, recording the song "18 A.D."

Homme and frequent collaborator Chris Goss performed as The 5:15ers at the inaugural ArthurBall, an offshoot of the ArthurFest festival, in Los Angeles on January 26, 2006. The two were later credited as "The Fififf Teeners" when they co-produced QOTSA's second album Rated R and fifth album Era Vulgaris.

In August 2009, Homme collaborated with The Prodigy's Liam Howlett for a remix of the Prodigy track "Take Me to the Hospital". It was re-titled "Take Me to the Hospital (Josh Homme and Liam H.'s Wreckage Remix)". That same year, he produced most of the Arctic Monkeys album Humbug. He later provided backing vocals on "All My Own Stunts" from their 2011 album Suck It and See, and vocals for the tracks "One For the Road" and "Knee Socks" on their 2013 album AM. Homme went on to appear at multiple Arctic Monkeys concerts in the USA including Austin City Limits and The Wiltern.

In June 2010, Homme appeared on the Comedy Central series Tosh.0 to do an unplugged duet version of the hit viral song "What What" with Samwell. He also provided the theme song to Aqua Unit Patrol Squad 1, formerly known as Aqua Teen Hunger Force, and collaborated with Mark Lanegan to provide the theme music for Anthony Bourdain's travel show Parts Unknown.

In May 2012, it was revealed on Dean Delray's comedy podcast Let There Be Talk that Homme would make a guest appearance on the album by Oliveri's project Mondo Generator called Hell Comes To Your Heart. The album was recorded over three days at Homme's Pink Duck Studios in Burbank, California, and features Homme playing guitar on the album's final track, "The Last Train". This marked the first time Homme and Oliveri collaborated since their public falling out in 2004. "The Last Train" also features fellow former Kyuss bandmate John Garcia providing vocals, which was recorded shortly before Homme's lawsuit with Garcia regarding the Kyuss Lives! band name; it was the first time Homme had collaborated with Garcia since 1997.

In June 2012, it was revealed that Homme would be starring in the music video for the song "A Better Place" from Glen Campbell's final album Ghost on the Canvas. In the video, Homme plays a bartender who shows Campbell a photo album of his life, from his early childhood through his music career to the present day. The video marked the end of Campbell's musical career and was a retrospect on his life following his decision to retire after his diagnosis of Alzheimer's disease. In July, he had a very brief cameo at the end of Jack White's music video for "Freedom at 21", playing a police officer who intercepts White at a roadblock following White's escapades throughout the video. In September, he contributed the song "Nobody to Love" to the soundtrack of the action-drama film End of Watch.

In early 2013, Homme and fellow Queens contributors Alain Johannes and Chris Goss added three tracks each to the soundtrack of Dave Grohl's documentary Sound City: Real to Reel. Homme was interviewed for the documentary and is notably included in a scene where he collaborates with Grohl and Trent Reznor, under the name Sound City Players, to come up with a song called "Mantra". Homme played bass and provided backing vocals on the track.

Homme has appeared in a number of television comedies. In December 2014, Homme made an appearance on Channel 4 sitcom Toast of London. The star of the show, Matt Berry, had been working alongside Morgana Robinson (the half-sister of Homme's ex-wife Brody Dalle) in the BBC sitcom House of Fools, in which both had prominent roles. Earlier in the year, Homme had also made appearances on IFC's Comedy Bang! Bang! and Portlandia.

In July 2015, Homme began hosting a weekly hour-long show called The Alligator Hour with Joshua Homme on Apple Music's 24-hour streaming internet radio station Beats 1. The show features a highly eclectic selection of songs personally selected by Homme, interspersed with his own wry introductions of (and commentary on) the various tracks on that particular week's playlist. The show's musical selections typically have some sort of thematic, stream-of-consciousness-type relationship to each other.

In March 2016, Homme released a surprise album with Iggy Pop titled Post Pop Depression. The nine-track album was recorded at Rancho De La Luna in Joshua Tree, California, as well as Homme's Pink Duck Studios. Their backing band included guitarist and keyboardist Dean Fertita and drummer Matt Helders; the two joined Pop and Homme on tour, along with Troy Van Leeuwen on guitar and Matt Sweeney on bass. The band made their debut on January 21, 2016, on The Late Show with Stephen Colbert, announcing the album, and proceeded on a North American and European theater tour that March, culminating in a performance at the Royal Albert Hall, filmed and released as a concert DVD. The album's recording was also filmed and compiled into the 2017 documentary American Valhalla. In October 2016, Homme produced New Skin, the debut album from Nick Valensi's new band CRX.

In 2017, Homme composed the score for Fatih Akin's German-language drama In the Fade, named after the Queens of the Stone Age song.

In 2018, Homme sang a song written by Daniel Lanois called "Cruel, Cruel World" for the soundtrack of the Rockstar action-adventure video game Red Dead Redemption 2. The game features two versions of the song, with Homme's version playing over the end credits and Willie Nelson's version playing during the epilogue.

In 2020, Homme featured alongside Mavis Staples on the Run the Jewels song "Pulling the Pin" from their fourth album RTJ4. Later that year, he and Staples joined Run the Jewels (via separate pre-recorded performances displayed on giant screens due to the COVID-19 pandemic) to play the song during the group's voter encouragement performance Holy Calamavote, broadcast on YouTube.

In 2021, Homme produced the songs "Boilermaker", "Space", and "King" from Royal Blood's album Typhoons. "Boilermaker" was included on the standard album release, while "Space" and "King" were only available on the deluxe edition.

In 2024, Homme recorded a guitar part in his home studio and sent it to Ukraine for inclusion in "Chaplain", a song by Ukrainian soldier Oleksandr Remez who is otherwise best known as the frontman of the rock band Ruky'v Bryuky; produced by Oleksandr Chemerov, the rest of the song was recorded in a mobile studio on the frontlines of the Russo-Ukrainian War as part of the Cultural Forces project to promote military music culture.

== Musical style ==
Homme's work is usually described as alternative rock, desert rock, hard rock, and stoner rock. He has been evasive in the past about the equipment he uses, changing the subject or occasionally lying when asked in interviews about his setup, as well as objecting to official photos of his pedalboard. He explained in June 2007, "I don't [share secrets] only because my sound is important to me and I've spent a lot of years just working it over with little tricks here and there, I almost feel like if you reveal too much of that you give away something that's near and dear to you. It's like you put it up on the altar and say, 'Here, everyone take a slice.'"

Homme relaxed his secretive approach to the subject in the 2010s, though much of his known equipment has been compiled through amateur photos and screenshots of him performing live and in the studio. In choosing his equipment, he tends to look for the odd or unique, opting to stay away from the typical choices of other guitar players. In an interview about guitars in 2008, he claimed at the time to own close to 35 guitars, and said that only three of them were "really good".

He has said that he purposely does not use famous guitars such as Stratocasters or Les Pauls, but that he is always in search of intriguing and unique guitars that are not always generally accepted as high-quality. He said that he tends to buy "weird Japanese guitars" or guitars that are "scarred" and have an interesting story.

== Charity work ==
In 2013, Homme co-founded the Sweet Stuff Foundation, a charity that aims to give assistance to musicians, recording engineers, and their families struggling with illness and disability.

== Personal life ==
=== Relationships and family ===
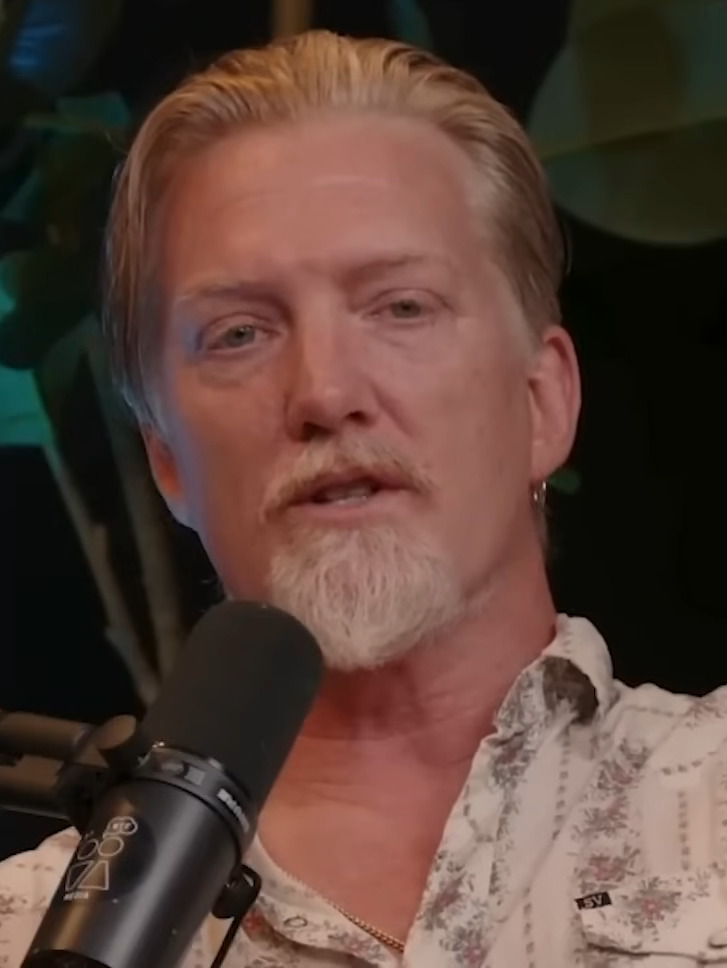
Homme in 2023

Homme met Australian singer and musician Brody Dalle at Lollapalooza in 1996, he was there to perform with Screaming Trees, while she was there to see her then-boyfriend Tim Armstrong's band Rancid. They reconnected seven years later in 2003, during her separation from Armstrong, and began dating. Homme claimed to have received multiple death threats from fans of Armstrong and Rancid. The two were married on December 3, 2005. They have a daughter, Camille (born 2006), and two sons, Orrin (born 2011) and Wolf (born 2016).

Dalle filed for legal separation in November 2019 and divorce a month later, citing Homme's alcoholism and drug abuse; he subsequently entered rehab, but he and Dalle would accuse each other of domestic violence and have mutual restraining orders filed over the following months.

Dalle requested that restraining orders be filed against him on behalf of their sons in September 2021, alleging physical and emotional abuse, but was denied by two judges. In 2023, Homme won sole custody of the children and was granted a restraining order against Dalle after it was discovered that her boyfriend had forged her signature on legal documents.

=== Views and hobbies ===
Homme once described himself as financially conservative and socially liberal, considering himself a "fallen libertarian". He has said that he dislikes the idea of using his influence to tell people how to vote, and often likens his music to an "ice cream parlour or arcade" where people can simply enjoy themselves.

Homme has adopted multiple pseudonyms over the years. He used the name "Carlo Von Sexron" to credit his bass, keyboard, piano, and drums playing on albums such as The Desert Sessions Volumes 3 & 4, Queens of the Stone Age, and Peace, Love, Death Metal. Homme is known as "(King) Baby Duck" to Dalle and the members of Eagles of Death Metal. He is also referred to as "J.Ho." and "The Ginger Elvis". Nick Oliveri referred to him as "Mr. Lucky".

Homme owns a few motorcycles, including a custom Falcon and a Harley-Davidson Ultra Classic. He drives a silver 1967 Chevrolet Camaro, which he bought at 14 years old for $2500 off the mechanic for the Palm Springs Police Department. It is the only car he has ever owned. He owns several guns, including a Winchester rifle, a sawed-off shotgun, and a Beretta 9 mm pistol.

Homme has over 20 tattoos. On his knuckles, he has his grandparents' nicknames ("Cam" for "Camille" on the left and "Cap" on the right) with hearts and his two sons' names ("ORH" for "Orrin Ryder Homme" and "Wolf"). He has his daughter's name, also Camille, tattooed over his heart. His left arm has a switchblade with "Stay Sharp" underneath, while his inner right arm has a straight razor with "Born to Win" inscribed; underneath, his nickname, "Baby Duck", is a shared tattoo with his Eagles of Death Metal bandmate Jesse Hughes, who has his nickname "Boots Electric" in the same location. Homme also shares a tattoo that says "Freitag 4:15" with former Queens of the Stone Age bandmates Nick Oliveri and Mark Lanegan and their sound engineer Hutch, commemorating their "worst show ever" at the 2001 Rock Am Ring Festival in Germany on a Friday at 4:15 p.m. All were tattooed on their ribs so that it would hurt the most and serve as a reminder.

=== Health issues ===
In a 2011 interview with NME, Homme said of the medical issues he had experienced the previous year, "I had surgery on my leg and there were complications and I died on the table. I was in bed for three months." He became depressed and considered quitting music, eventually finding himself unable to produce any new music at all for almost two years. He has said that this experience greatly contributed to the making of the album ...Like Clockwork (2013). He credited Transcendental Meditation with helping him recover.

In June 2017, Homme revealed on Steve Jones' radio show that he had recently tried to quit his decades-long smoking habit via hypnotherapy, but claimed that it failed because he was unable to relax enough to be fully influenced by the hypnotherapist. Three months later, Royal Blood frontman Mike Kerr discussed Homme's drinking habits and told Radio X interviewer Gordon Smart, "I can't go anywhere near [Homme] without having an unbelievable amount of tequila in my body. I did hide from him once [while touring together] because I could hear him coming and I was like, 'Oh no, I'm gonna have to do more tequila.' So I hid in the toilets of the dressing room." By 2023, Homme had completed rehab and was sober.

In an April 2023 interview with Revolver, Homme revealed that he had been diagnosed with cancer the previous year, but did not specify the type of cancer; he underwent a successful operation to remove it from his body and spent the following year recovering.

In July 2024, during the European leg of The End Is Nero World Tour, Queens of the Stone Age postponed a concert in Italy as Homme was forced to return to the U.S. for emergency surgery of an undisclosed nature. They later announced the cancellation or postponement of all shows in 2024 due to Homme requiring "essential medical care" for the remainder of the year.

=== Legal issues and controversies ===
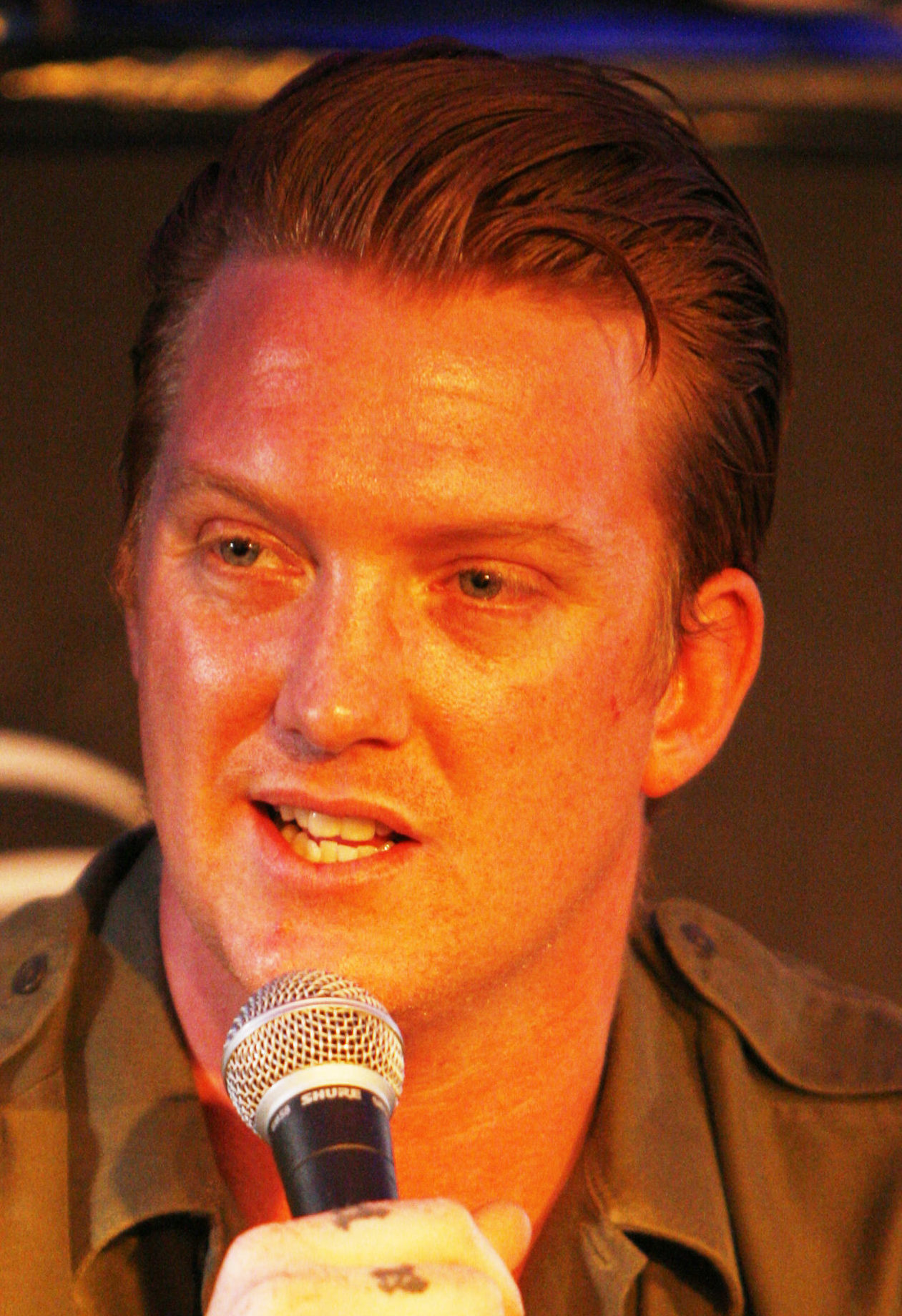
Homme in July 2007

In 2004, Homme was arrested for assaulting Dwarves frontman Blag Dahlia and Karl Doyle at the Dragonfly club in Los Angeles. Pleading no contest, he was ordered to remain at least 100 yards away from Dahlia and the club, sentenced to three years' probation with community service, and forced to enter a rehab program for 60 days.

In June 2008, at the Norwegian Wood Festival in Oslo, Homme drew criticism for his reaction to an audience member who had thrown a shoe at him. He called the audience member a "chicken-shit fucking faggot" and "a 12-year-old dickless fucking turd". The incident drew accusations of homophobia from several blogs, which were later picked up by the mainstream media. Homme eventually responded in a public letter in which he denied all accusations of homophobia.

Reaction to his apology was mixed, with music journalist Tim Jonze stating, "Attempting to prove his pro-gay stance, Homme points out in his letter that he also called the guy a pussy and threatened to have anal sex with him. OK, so it's a fuzzy kind of logic we're talking about here." In an interview 10 years later, Homme revealed that he had often been beaten up during his youth while trying to defend his gay older brother from homophobic bullying.

Following a September 2013 performance at Jay-Z's Made in America Festival, Homme made comments about Jay-Z during a radio interview with CBC Radio 2's Strombo Show. He explained that his band was frisked by the event's security team prior to the performance and referred to Jay-Z's personal interaction with the band as a marketing stunt: "[Jay-Z] has his security frisking the bands on the way in. I just told them, 'If you open up my bag I'm not playing, so I guess it's up to you whether we are playing or not.' [...] He also gave us some champagne and wanted us to take a photo with it. And I thought, 'That's not a gift, that is a marketing tool.' So I destroyed it."

In December 2017, Homme was captured on video kicking the camera of Shutterstock photographer Chelsea Lauren into her face during KROQ's Almost Acoustic Christmas concert in Los Angeles. After staying through the show and photographing subsequent bands, Lauren went to Cedars-Sinai for treatment. In a statement, Homme claimed that he had been kicking over lighting equipment and was unaware that he had kicked Lauren until he was informed of it the next day. Lauren disputed this, stating that he had made eye contact with her before kicking her. Homme later issued a video response in which he admitted to kicking Lauren and apologized to her.

== Filmography ==
Year	Title	Role	Notes
1997	Metallimania	Himself	Documentary
2005	American Dad!	Himself (voice)	Episode: "Francine's Flashback"
2007	Hot Rod	Gown	
2007–2012	Anthony Bourdain: No Reservations	Himself	3 episodes
2008–2012	Aqua Teen Hunger Force	Various (voices)	2 episodes
2010	Tosh.0	Himself	
2011	Truckfighters	Himself	Documentary
2013	Sound City	Himself	Documentary
2013	The Gorburger Show	Himself	Episode: "Jack Black, Eagles of Death Metal"
2013	Comedy Bang! Bang!	Dale	Episode: "Clark Gregg Wears a Navy Blazer & White Collared Shirt"
2014	Toast of London	Himself	Episode: "Fool in Love"
2014	Foo Fighters: Sonic Highways	Himself	Episode: "Los Angeles"
2014	Portlandia	Carrie's Brother	Episode: "Late in Life Drug Use"
2015	Lo Sound Desert	Himself	Documentary
2015	The Redemption of the Devil	Himself	Documentary
2016	The Man from Mo'Wax	Himself	Documentary
2016	Gutterdämmerung	Himself	
2016	Desert Age: A Rock and Roll Scene History	Himself	Documentary
2016	Talking Dead	Himself	1 episode
2016	Unfinished Plan: The Path of Alain Johannes	Himself	Documentary
2017	Eagles of Death Metal: Nos Amis	Himself	Documentary
2017	American Valhalla	Himself	Documentary
2017	Bedtime Stories	Himself	Episode: "Zog"; For CBeebies
2018	Anthony Bourdain: Parts Unknown	Himself	Documentary
2019	Historical Roasts	Elvis Presley	Episode: "Muhammad Ali"
2019	Trailer Park Boys: The Animated Series	Himself	Episode: "Trailerstock"
2019	ZZ Top: That Little Ol' Band from Texas	Himself	Documentary
