= Aristocrunk =

Studio album by Lord T & Eloise
- Released: 2006
- Recorded: 2006
- Genre: Crunk
- Label: Young Ave. Records
- Producer: MysterE

Lord T & Eloise chronology
Aristocrunk (2006)	Chairmen of the Bored (2008)

Professional ratings
Review scores
Source	Rating
Blender	(Editor's Pick)
Chattanooga Pulse	(not rated)
Memphis Flyer	A

Aristocrunk is the debut album by crunk rap group Lord T & Eloise, released in 2006 by Young Avenue Records.

== Album information ==
The title of the album is in reference to the unique style of the band, which is the first legitimate rap group to represent the perspective of the uber-wealthy. The album notes describe the band as "genetically engineered over generations of obscure royalty". It also says that "they have emerged from the past to save the present, waiting for the right moment to spread their gospel of the good life".

== Track listing ==
All tracks are written by Lord T & Eloise.

No.	Title	Music	Length
1.	"Creation Myth"		1:16
2.	"Million Dollar Boots"	feat. Al Kapone	3:56
3.	"Never Workin"	feat. Chopper Girl	4:18
4.	"Black Limousine"	feat. Free Sol	2:44
5.	"Cashmere"		3:51
6.	"The Goodies Here & There"		0:19
7.	"Penthouse Suite"	feat. Kallen Esperian	3:08
8.	"Test Your Strength"		0:33
9.	"To My Ladies"		3:57
10.	"Designer Things"		3:18
11.	"Goin' Shopping"		4:04
12.	"Red Phone"		4:00
13.	"I'm Rich"		3:30
14.	"Pills"	feat. Kaz	4:02
15.	"Drastically Plastic"	feat. Muck Sticky	4:34
16.	"Priceless"		3:28
17.	"Sotheby's"		4:24
18.	"Word"		0:50
19.	"Make Dat Monet"	feat. Kallen Esperian	4:51
20.	"Must It Be That Way Again?"		1:45
