= Honkey Kong =

Honkey Kong may refer to:

- Honkey Kong (Apathy album), 2011
- Honkey Kong (Boots Electric album), 2011
