= Kallen Esperian =

American opera singer (born 1961)

- Born: June 8, 1961 (age 65); Waukegan, Illinois, U.S.
- Education: University of Illinois Urbana-Champaign
- Occupation: Opera singer

Kallen Esperian (born June 8, 1961) is an American lyric soprano. She won the Luciano Pavarotti International Voice Competition in 1985 and is best known for her performances in major opera productions.

== History ==
Kallen Esperian was born on June 8, 1961 in Waukegan, Illinois. She was named after her Armenian grandfather, Kalouste, who escaped Armenia from Turkish invasion. Her birth father died of a heart attack when she was eleven months old. After her mother remarried, she moved to Barrington, Illinois. She began ballet lessons when she was three years old and soon picked up voice and piano lessons. Esperian attended Barrington High School, where her choral director suggested she pursue voice in college. She would later go on to win her high school's "1990 Distinguished Graduate Award."

Esperian received a full scholarship to study opera at University of Illinois Urbana-Champaign. During her freshman year, she performed her first opera, The Magic Flute. While still in college, she was cast in a touring production of The Beggar's Opera by Opera Theatre of Saint Louis. Before graduating, she entered the Luciano Pavarotti International Voice Competition and won the competition and a scholarship in 1985. In 1986, she made her debut in Philadelphia as Mimi in La bohème opposite Pavarotti and subsequently appeared in the film Distant Harmony while in China with Pavarotti. Since then she has sung at most of the world's important opera houses, specializing in Italian opera, particularly in Verdi roles.

Esperian has appeared with Pavarotti in his annual concert, Pavarotti Plus, in 1991 at Lincoln Center and in 1995 at the Royal Albert Hall in London. These concerts have been televised and have been released internationally on CD and video. In 1991, she partnered Pavarotti in Verdi's Luisa Miller at the Met and in 1993, she appeared in the Met Gala celebrating the 25th anniversary of Pavarotti and Plácido Domingo at the house. She sang Desdemona to Pavarotti's Otello and Leonora in Il trovatore with Pavarotti and Domingo both singing Manrico.

She also sang Cio-Cio-san in Madama Butterfly in 2004, a role she first performed for the Nederlandse Opera in Amsterdam in 2002 as well as for New Orleans Opera, Opera Carolina in Charlotte, and the Nashville Opera as well as concerts in Johnstown, Memphis, Tennessee, and Mexico City.

In 2004 and 2005 Esperian sang Cio-Cio-san with the Metropolitan Opera of New York in the fall and winter season's performances of Madama Butterfly.

In 2007, Esperian recorded a CD of rock and jazz classics, which includes a cover of "Immigrant Song" by Led Zeppelin. She also recorded vocals for two songs on the album Aristocrunk, with Memphis rappers Lord T & Eloise.

== World appearances ==
Esperian has sung at the Royal Opera House Covent Garden as Desdemona in Otello and Amelia in Simon Boccanegra. She partnered José Carreras in Stiffelio at the Teatro alla Scala, for their first staging of the opera. She played Desdemona opposite Domingo at the Opéra National de Paris; Mimí at the Teatro Colón in Buenos Aires; Liú in Turandot, Desdemona, and Alice Ford in Falstaff for the Lyric Opera of Chicago; Desdemona and Maria Stuarda at the Teatro Comunale di Bologna; Verdi's Requiem at the Teatro di San Carlo in Naples, Falstaff for Los Angeles Opera; Aida and Tosca for the Semperoper in Dresden; La Traviata with Opera Memphis, and Norma with both Pittsburgh Opera and Opera Memphis; Manon Lescaut at the Bavarian State Opera in Munich, where she has also been heard as Amelia in Verdi's Un ballo in maschera and Elisabetta in Don Carlo, under the baton of Zubin Mehta. She has also sung at the Berlin Staatsoper, the Deutsche Oper, Berlin, and the Arena di Verona.

She has sung the Verdi Requiem with several of the world's great conductors, including Sir Colin Davis, Giuseppe Sinopoli, Robert Shaw, Daniele Gatti, Daniel Oren, Myung-Whun Chung, and David Zinman.

Esperian joined the Opera Orchestra of New York as Desdemona at Carnegie Hall for Carlo Bergonzi's first assumption of the role of Otello at age 75.

Esperian was one of the Three Sopranos with Kathleen Cassello and Cynthia Lawrence, produced by Tibor Rudas Theatrical Productions, and a soprano counterpart to the Three Tenors. Esperian is the only one of "The Three Sopranos" to have performed individually with each one of the "Three Tenors" in concerts and in opera houses around the world.

In 2011–2012, Esperian held the position of Artist in Residence at the University of Mississippi. Her activities included master classes, classes for voice students and other music students, appearances on campus and off campus, and work with the University of Mississippi Opera Theatre.
