= Shops of Saddle Creek =

Saddle Creek
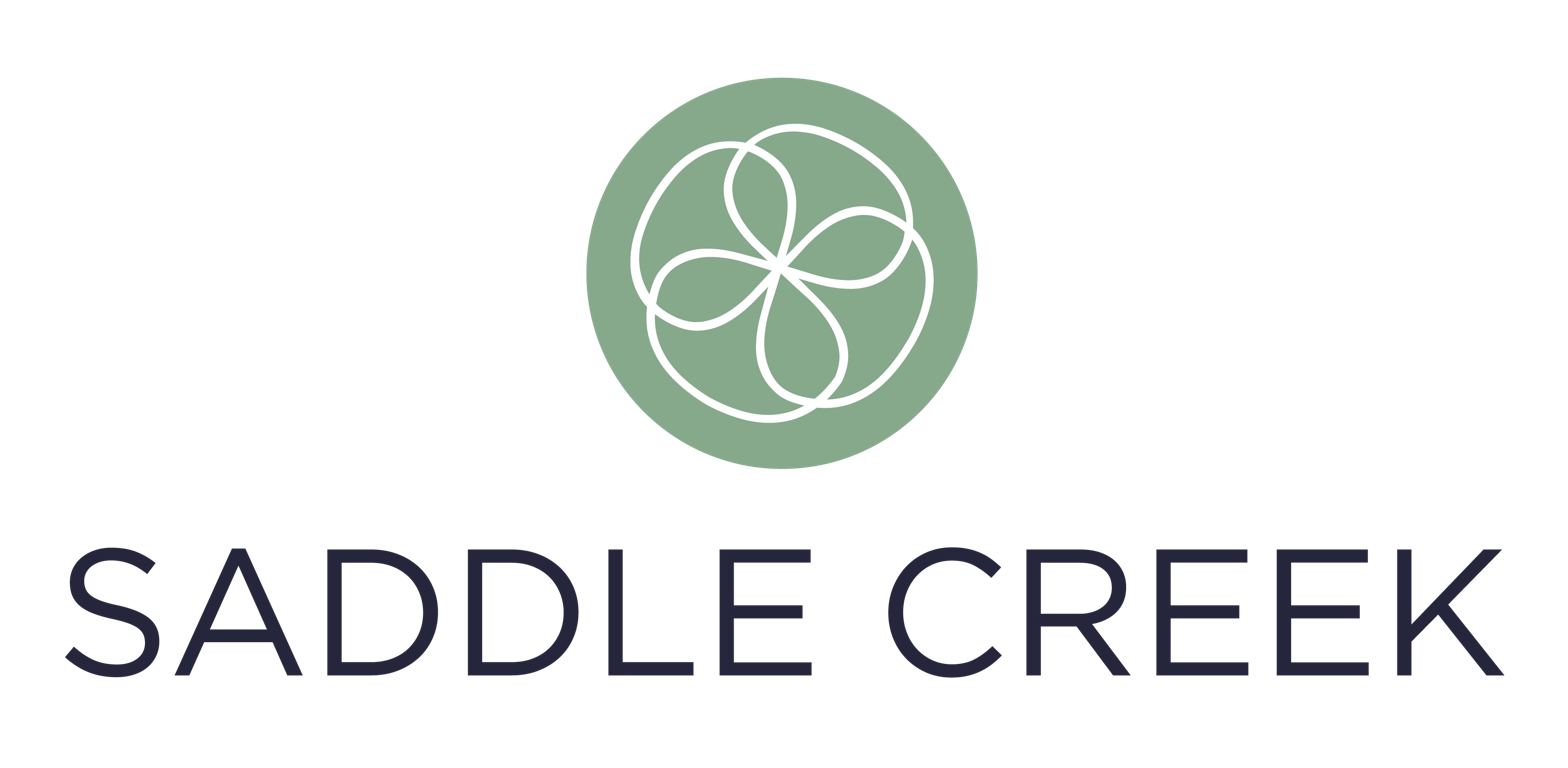

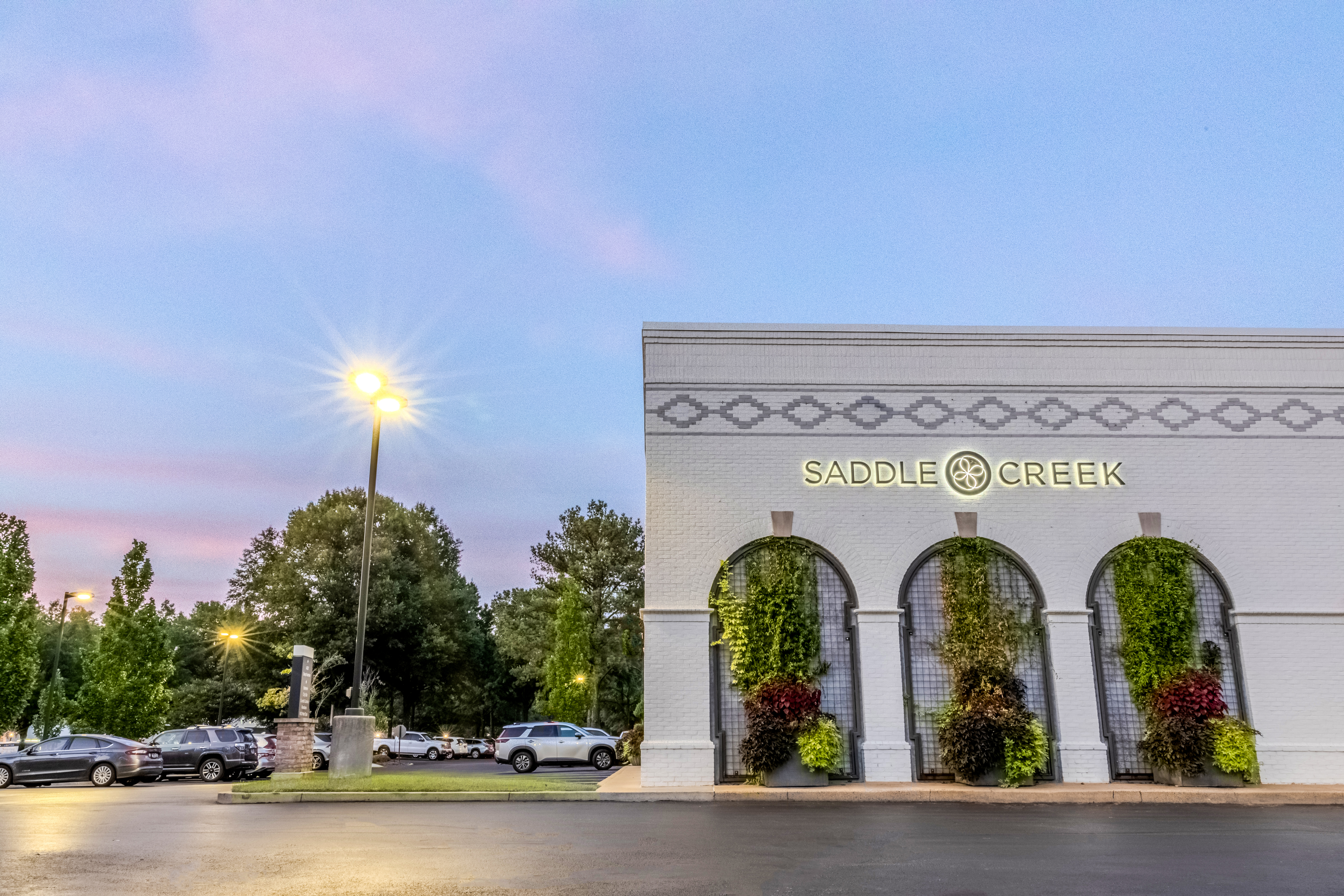
- Location: Poplar Avenue at West Farmington Boulevard, Germantown, Tennessee, United States
- Coordinates: 35°5′41.1″N 89°48′33.3″W
- Opened: 1987
- Developer: Poag & McEwen
- Manager: Trademark Property Company
- Owner: Saddle Creek
- Num. of stores: 40+
- Num. of anchor tenants: 0
- Floor area: 173,805 square feet (16,147.0 m^{2}) (GLA)
- Floors: 1
- Public transit: MATA
- Website: shopsofsaddlecreek.com

Saddle Creek is the first shopping center in the nation developed as a lifestyle center. It is located in the suburb of Germantown in eastern Memphis, Tennessee, United States, and it includes national specialty shops and restaurants. About 70% of tenants are unique to the Memphis market.

Saddle Creek straddles Poplar Avenue, with Saddle Creek North located at Poplar Avenue and West Farmington Boulevard and Saddle Creek South located at Poplar Avenue and West Street. The center offers pet-friendly shopping and complimentary Wi-Fi.

Saddle Creek was voted Best Shopping Center in Memphis by the readers of the Memphis Flyer from 2017 through 2025.

Trademark Property Company currently manages Saddle Creek.

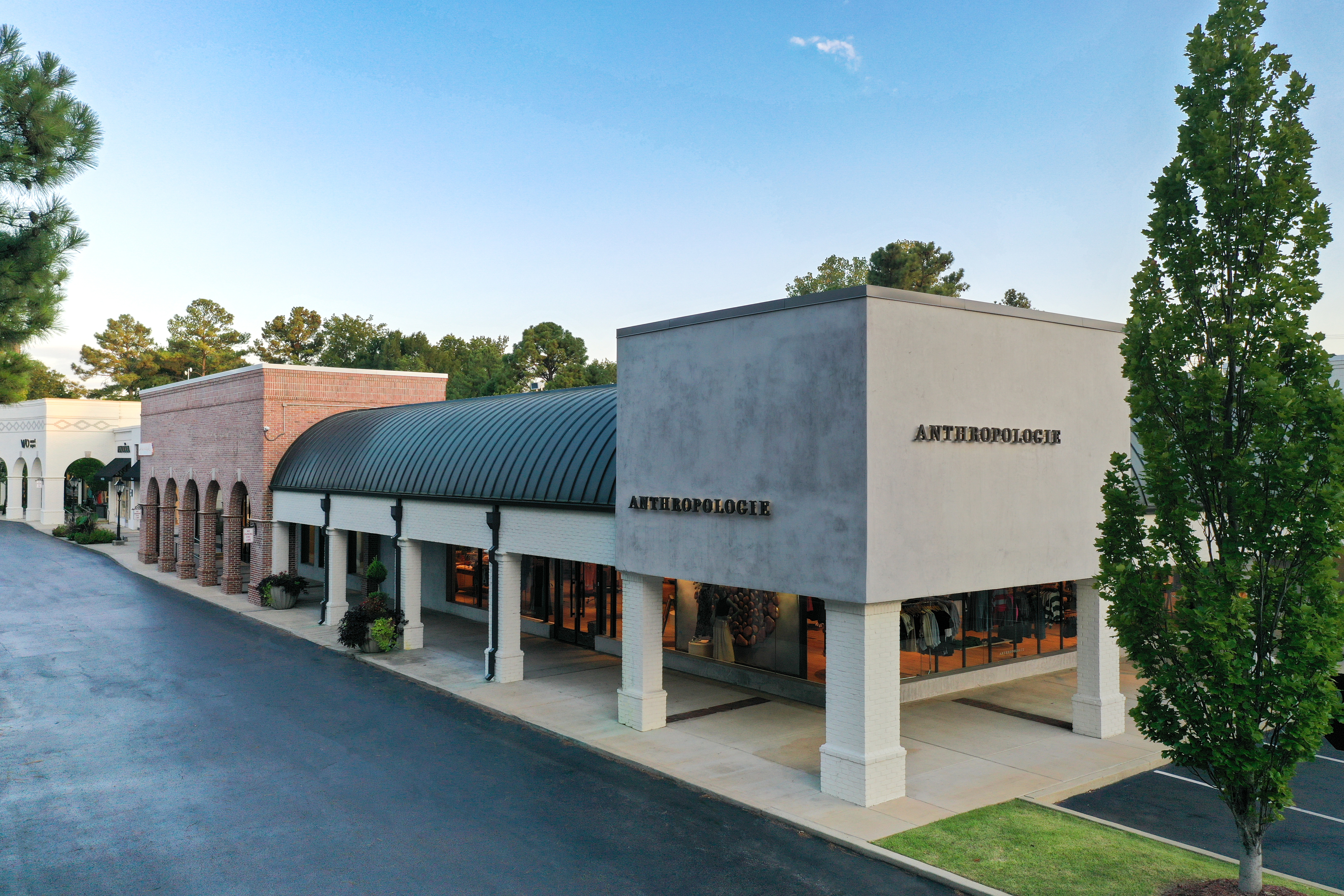

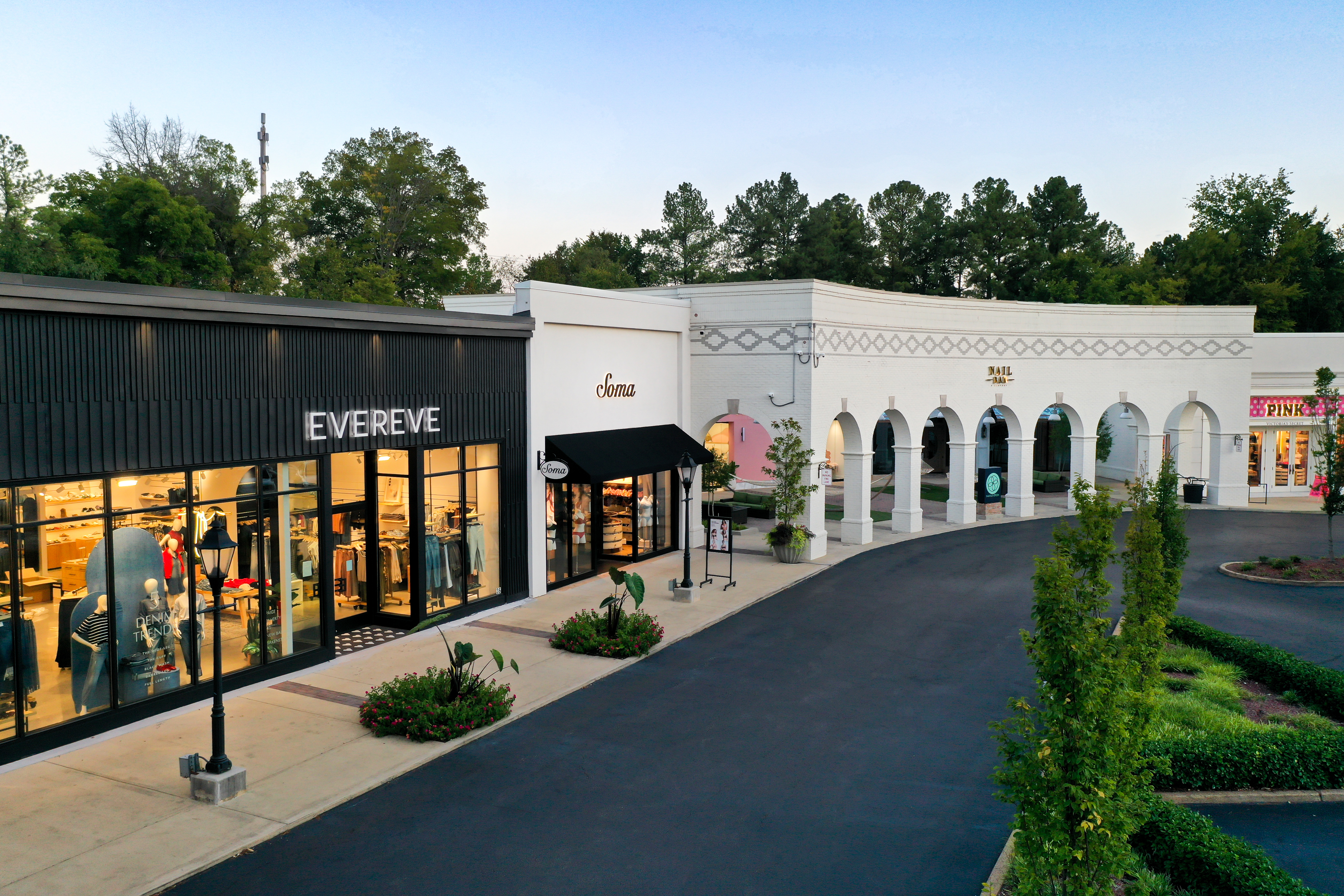

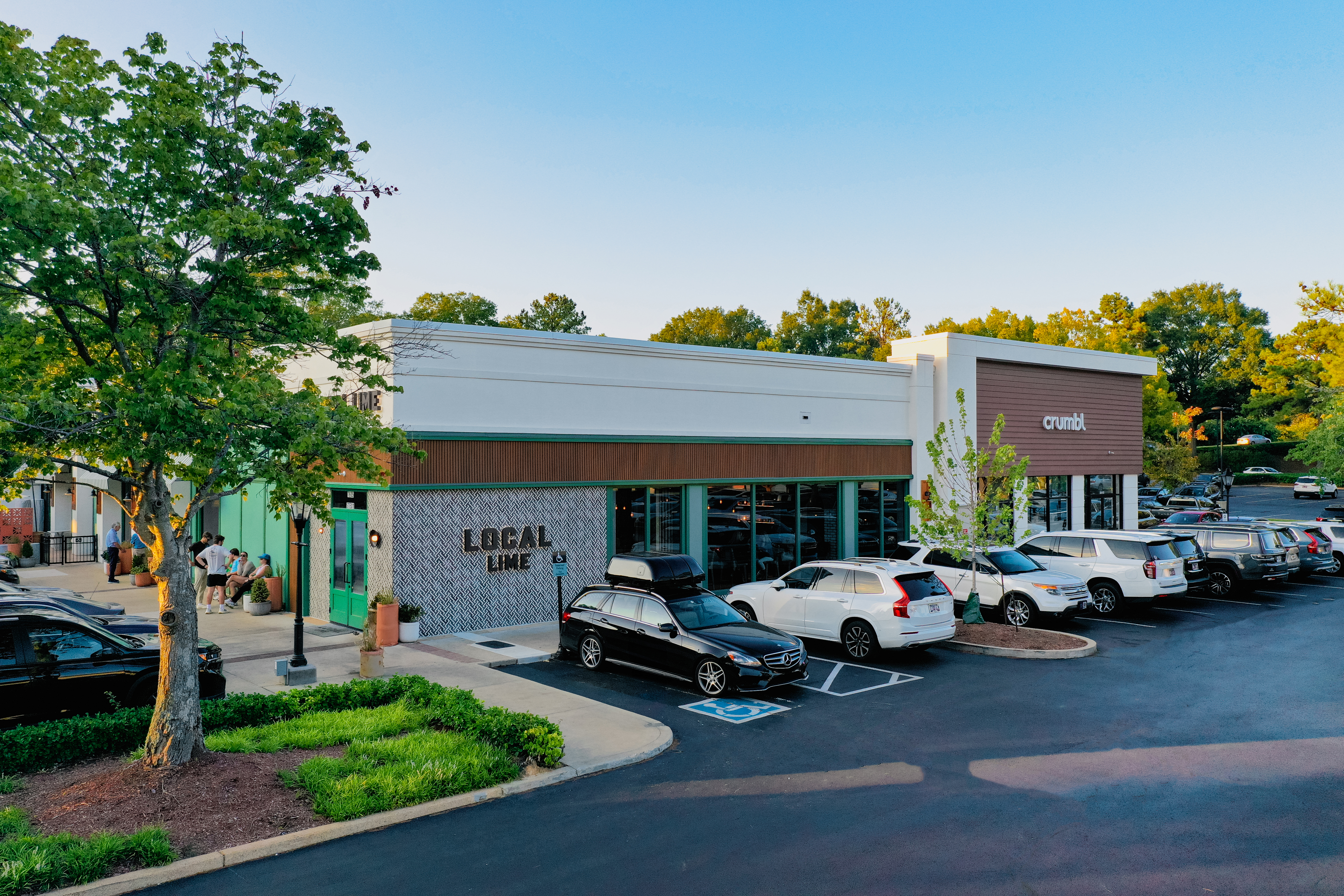

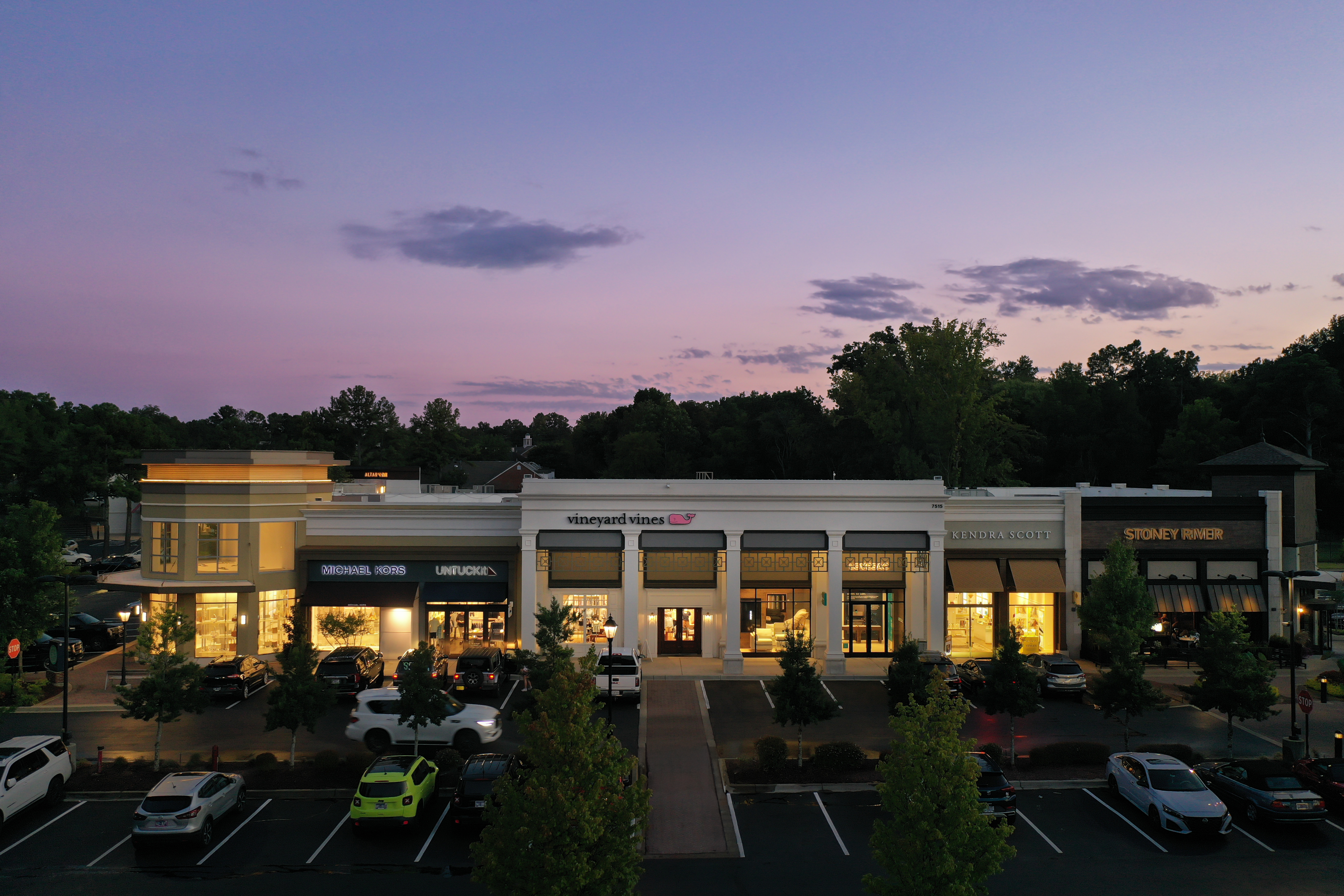

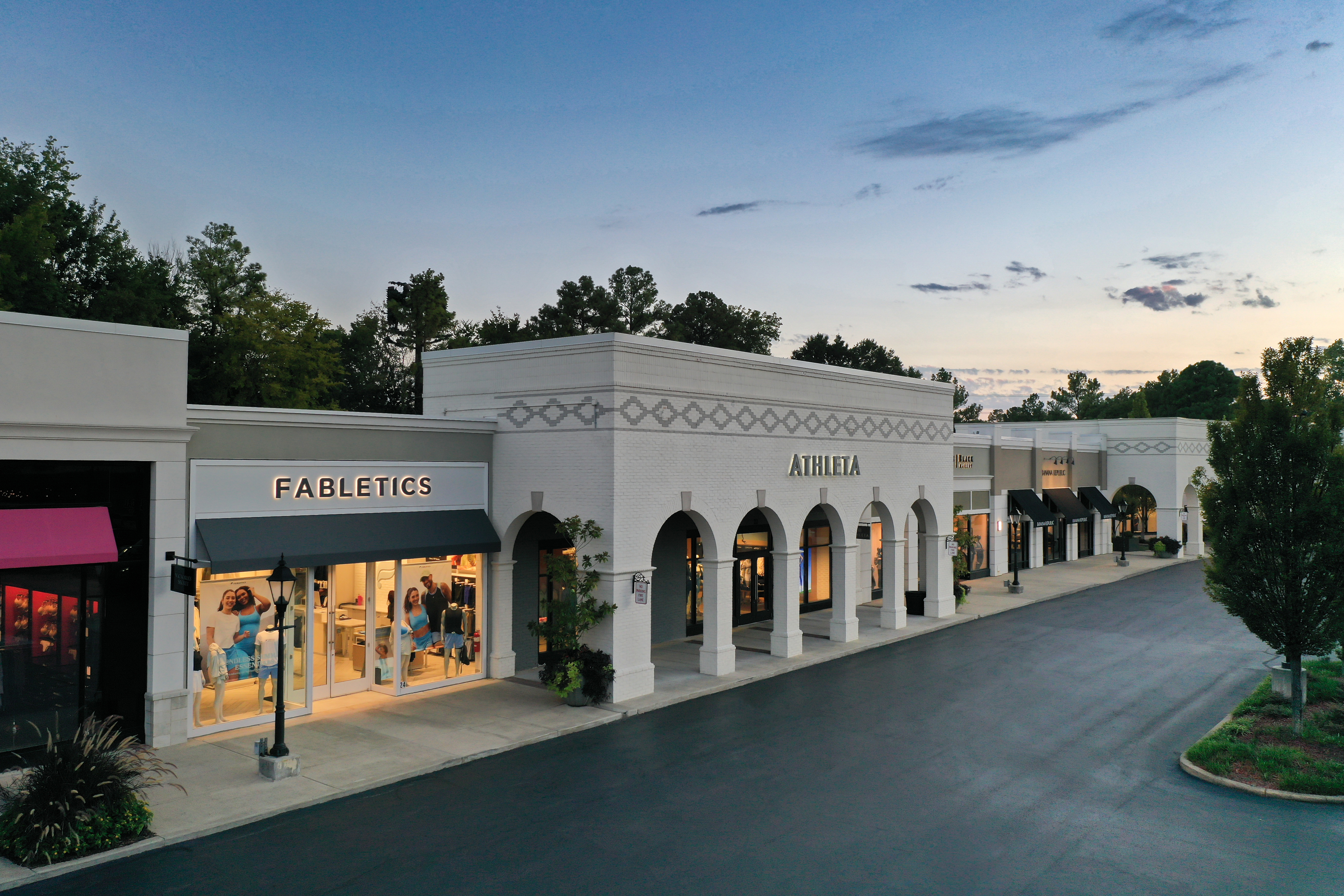

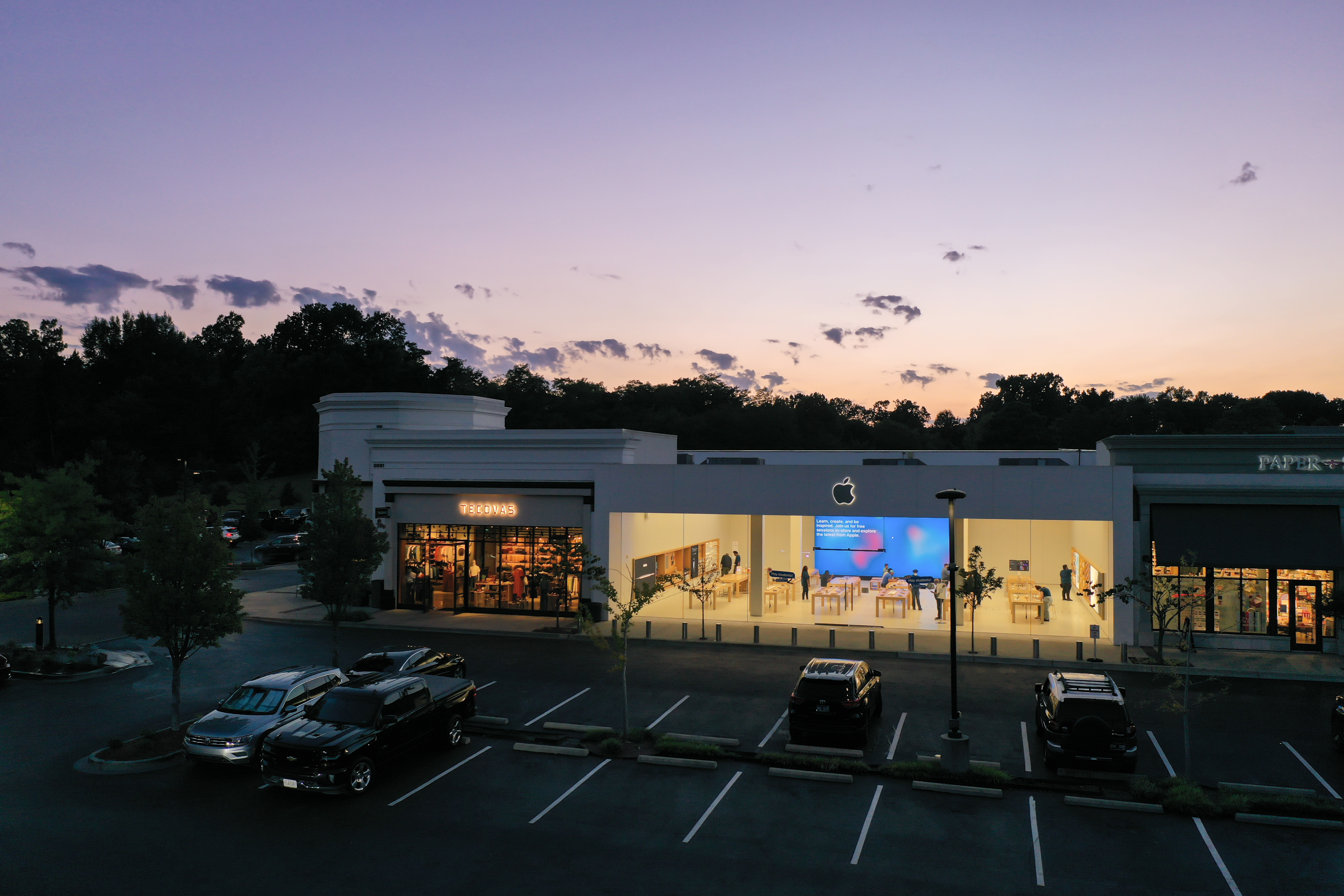

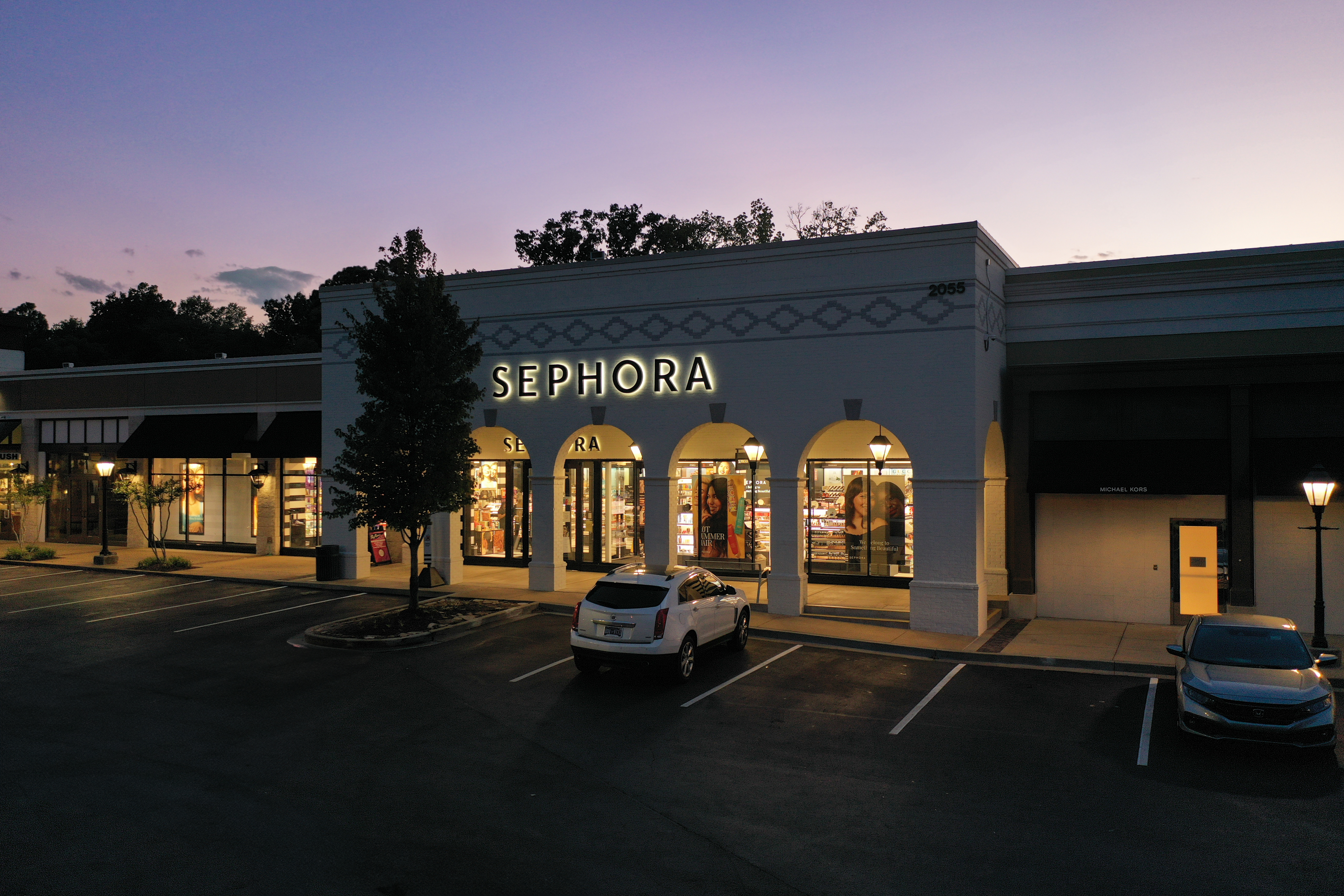

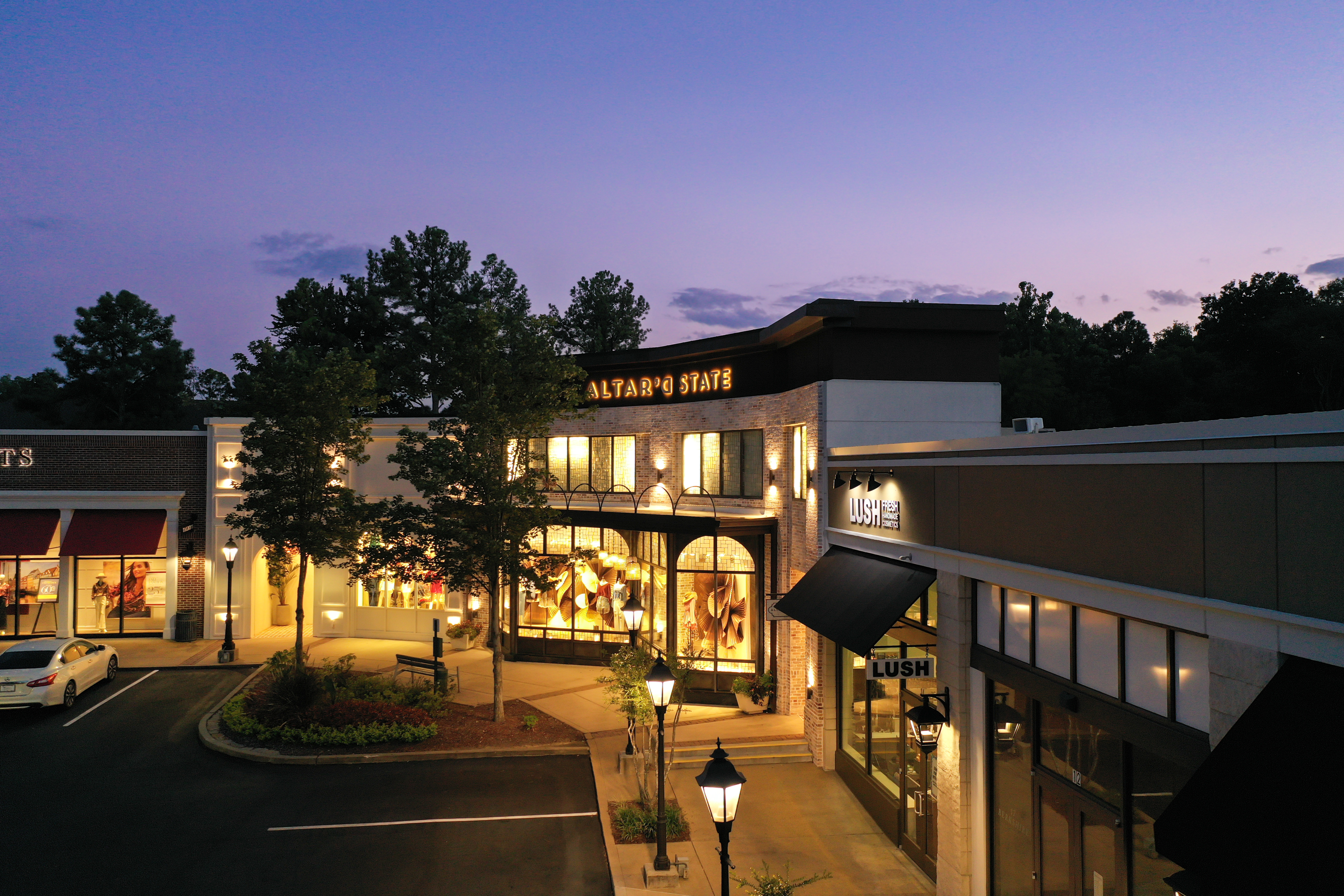

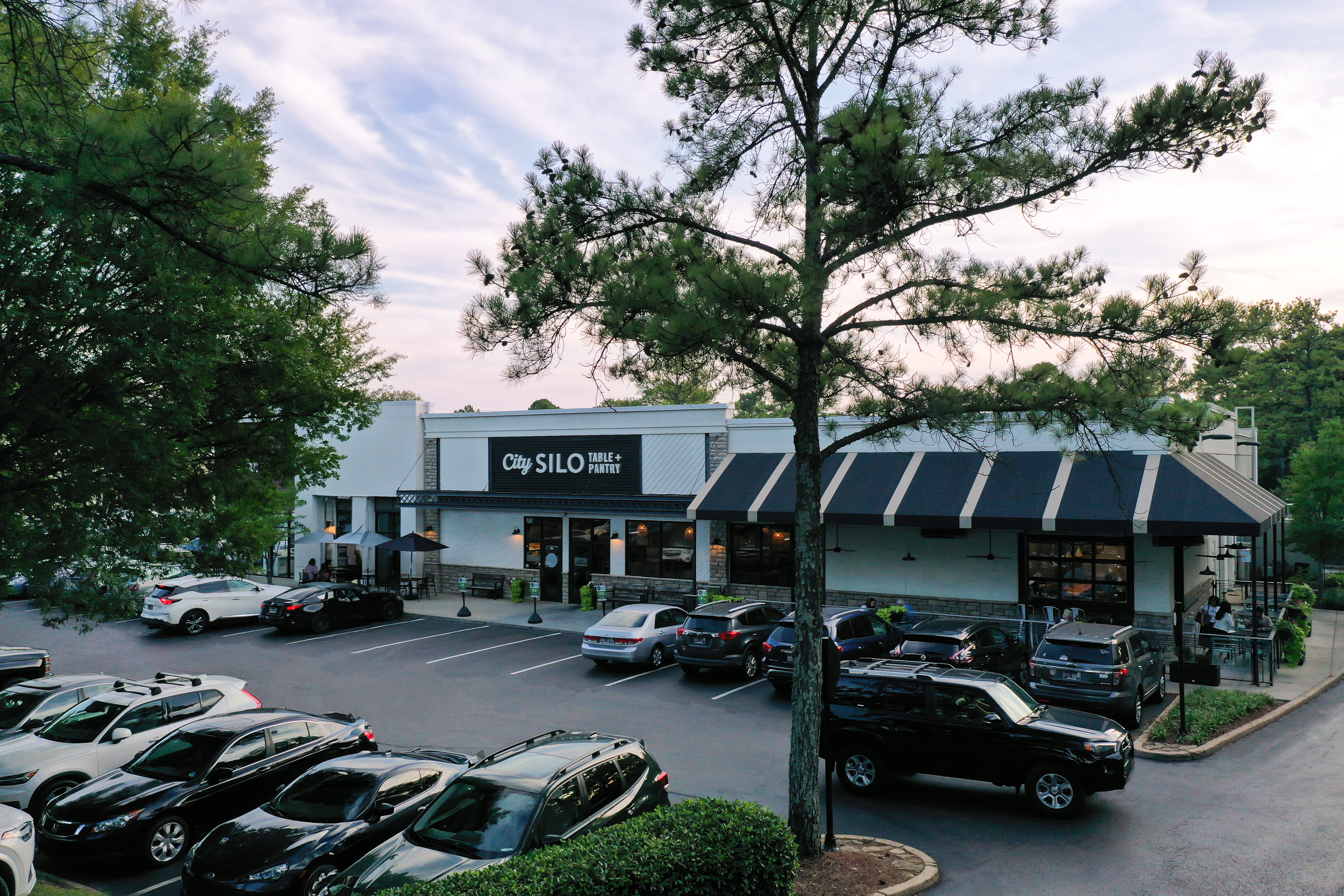

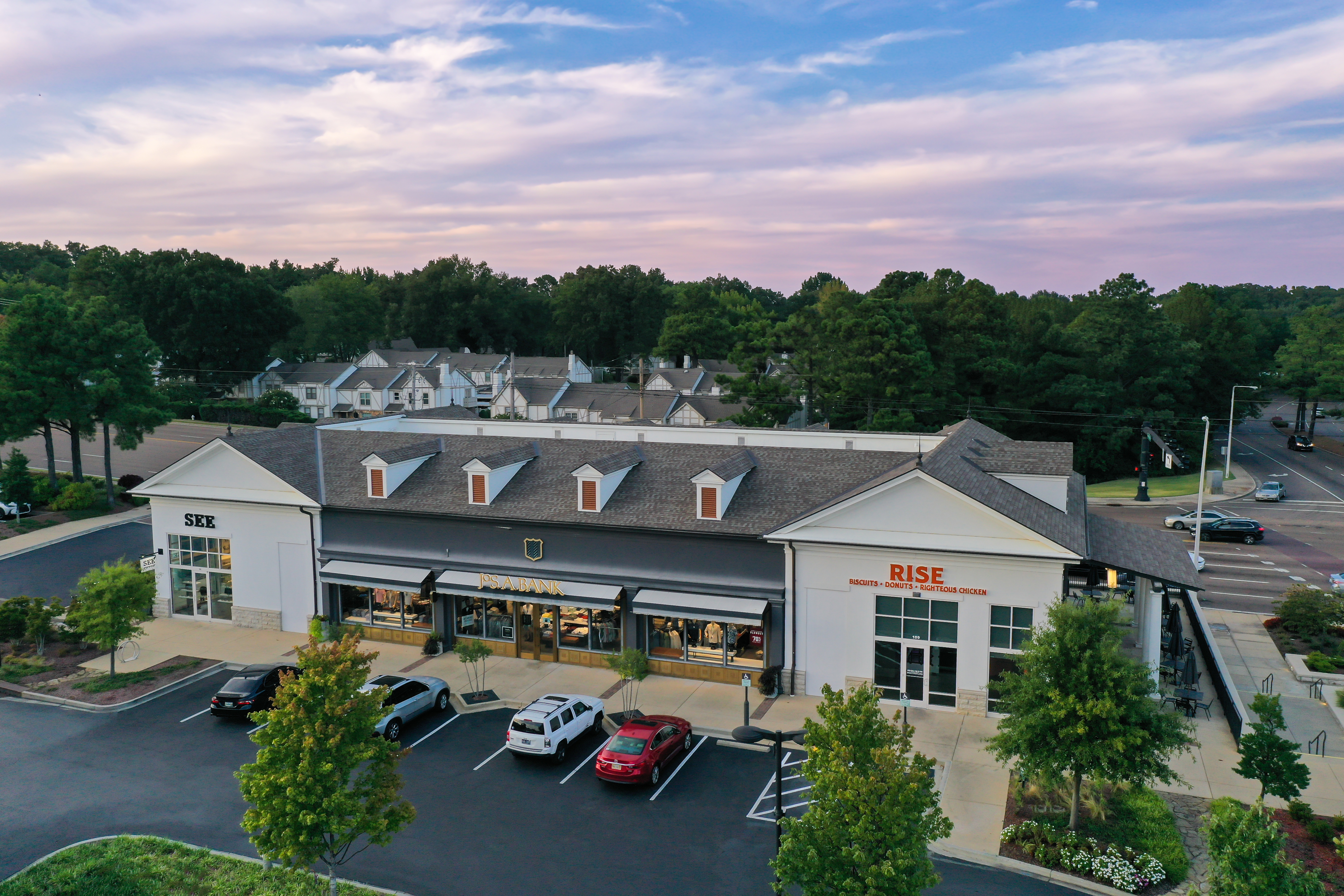

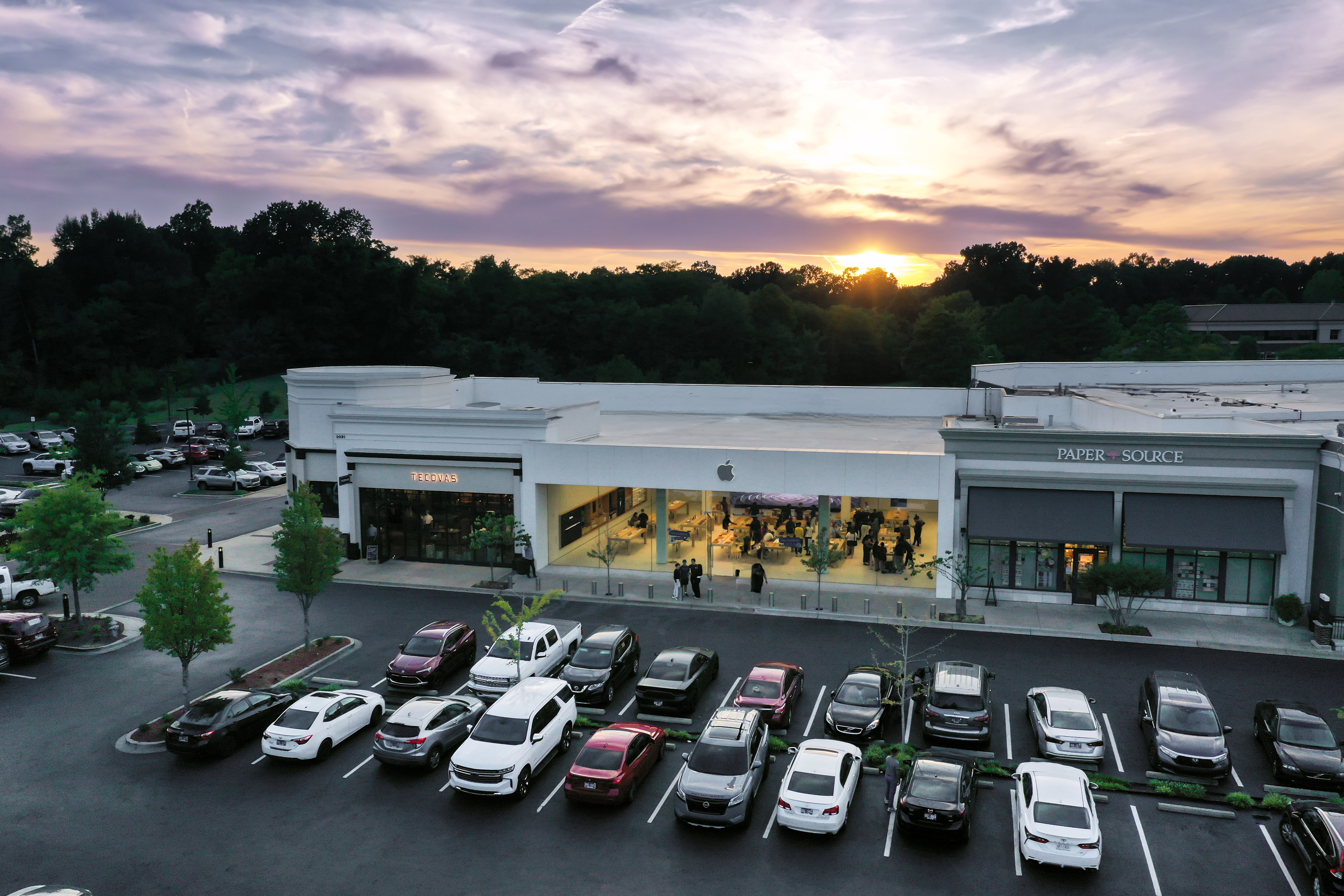

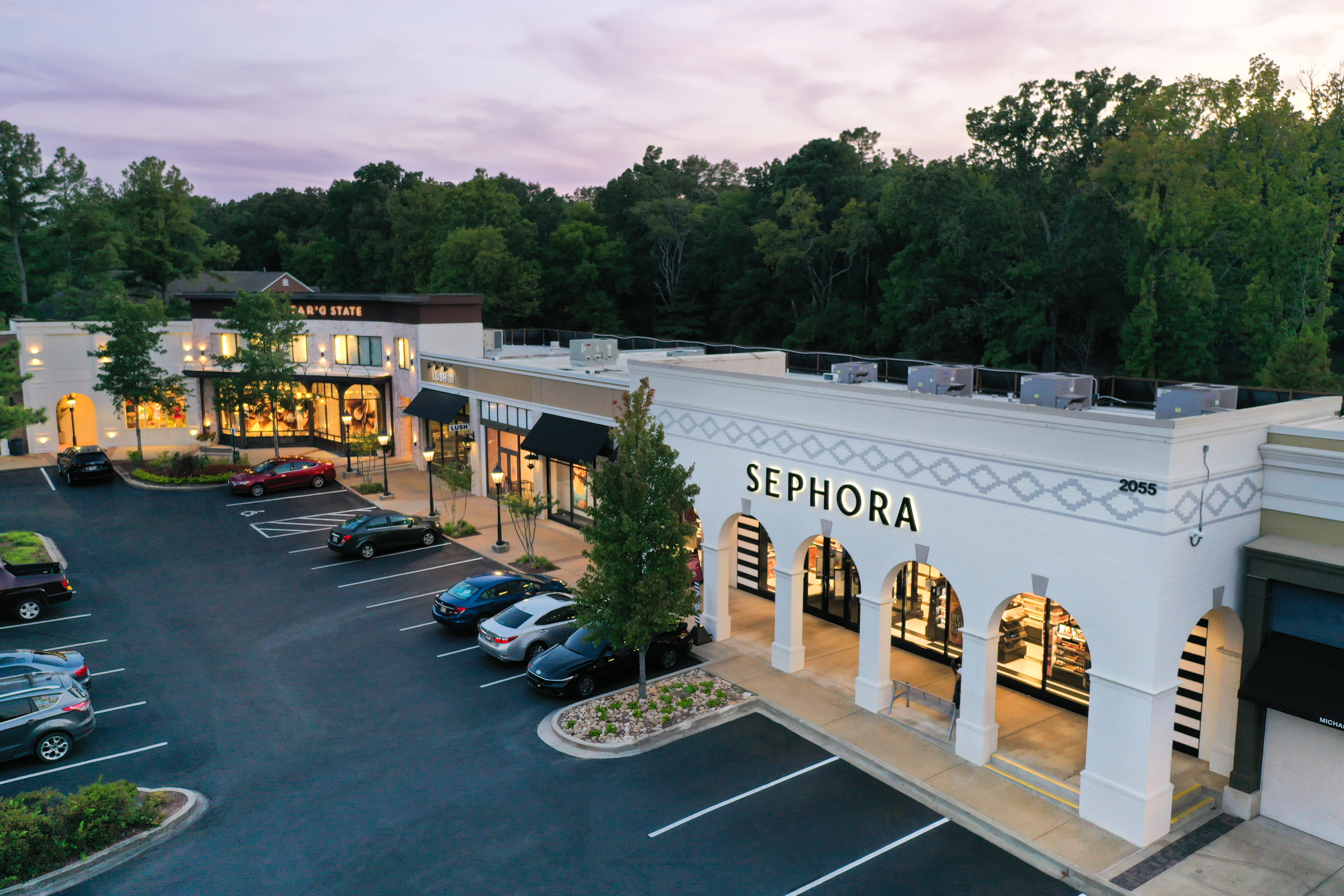

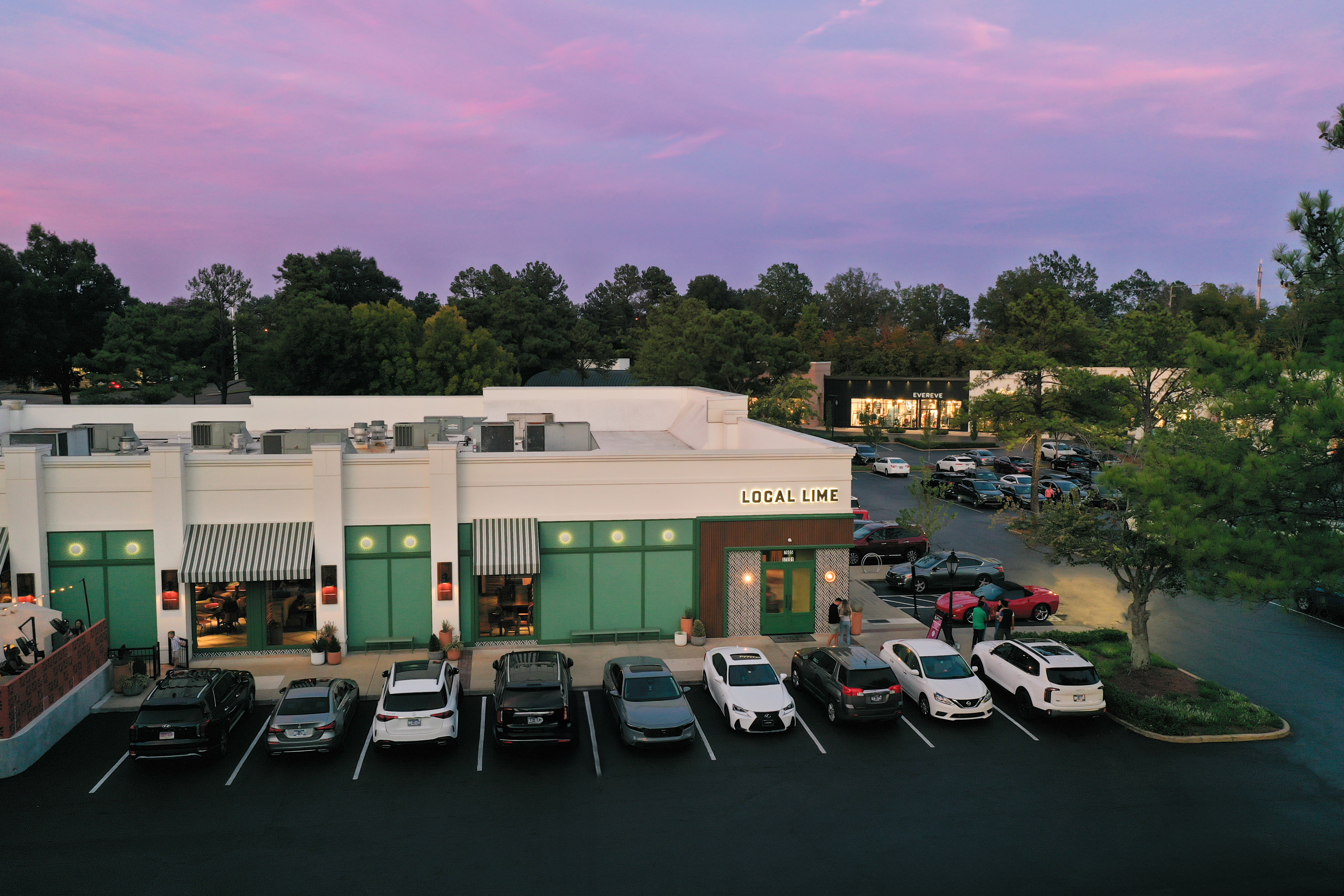

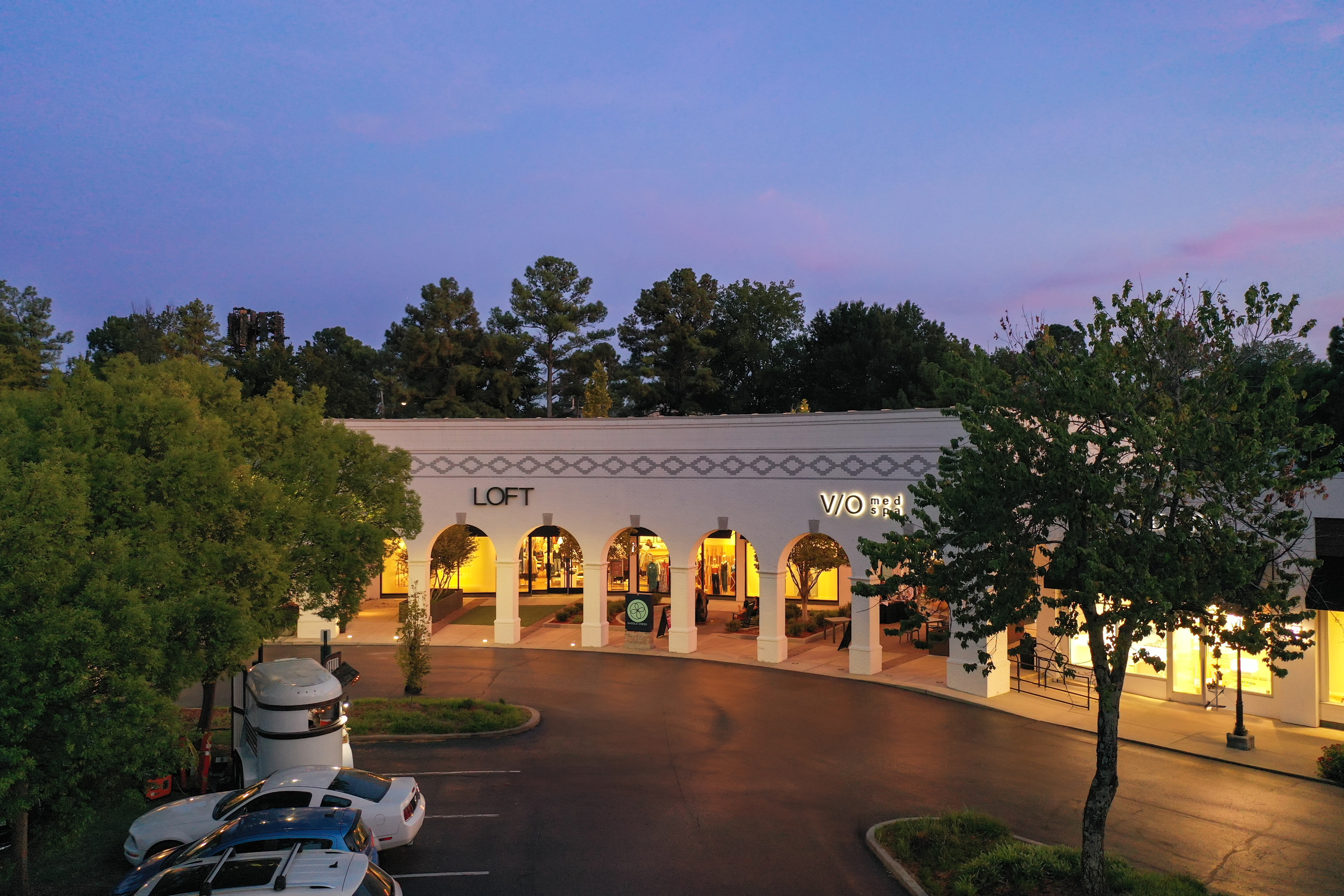

== See also ==
- List of shopping malls in Tennessee
