= Björn Tagemose =

Swedish photographer and creative director

Bjorn Tagemose (born 11 June 1969) is an Antwerp based, Swedish photographer and creative director.

== Biography ==
Having his roots in Scandinavia, he combines the strong image language of the North and his fashion experiences with the popular Antwerp-designer scene. He has had several solo expos in venues like Kulturhuset in Stockholm and the Louvre museum in Paris. The famous Groeningemuseum in Bruges has added four of Tagemose’s photographs to its permanent collection. His work has been published in books and magazines like V-magazine, Black book (co-operation with Tim Van Steenbergen), Dealer Deluxe etc. Tagemose has shot consecutive worldwide and European campaigns (both still and film) for major commercial brands like Louis Vuitton, Lee Jeans, Adidas, Natan and co-operated with designers José Enrique Oña Selfa (Loewe), Dirk Schonberger, Walter Van Beirendonck and most of the Antwerp-designer scene.

He also directed commercials for Nike & Adidas featuring sport-gods like David Beckham and Haile Gebrselassie or for Paris' most popular music magazine Les Inrockuptibles.

More recently Tagemose directed big multimedia rock and fashion shows and music videos for artists like Grace Jones, Editors, David Guetta, Juanes, Juan Luis Guerra, Miguel Bosé, The Hives, Axelle Red, Tiësto, dEUS, Macy Gray, Ozark Henry, Simple Minds, Kane and Juliette Lewis and the Licks. He has been creative director on fashion events such as Bread & Butter, 080 Barcelona Fashion and Elite Model Look.

Tagemose is also founder of Shoottheartist, an artist collective working on multimedia video-art.

In 2015, Tagemose directed the silent film Gutterdämmerung, starring Iggy Pop, Grace Jones, Henry Rollins, Lemmy of Motörhead, Nina Hagen, Tom Araya of Slayer, Slash of Guns N' Roses and Eagles of Death Metal's Jesse Hughes and Olivia Vinall.
