= Leonora in the Morning Light =

- Directed by: Thor Klein; Lena Vurma
- Written by: Thor Klein; Lena Vurma
- Produced by: Lena Vurma; Monica Moreno; Alejandra Malvida; Paul Zischler; James Heath
- Starring: Olivia Vinall; Alexander Scheer; Ryan Gage
- Cinematography: Tudor Vladimir Panduru
- Edited by: Matthieu Taponier
- Music by: Mariá Portugal
- Production company: Dragonfly Films
- Distributed by: Alamode Film
- Release date: 28 June 2025 (Filmfest München)
- Running time: 103 minutes
- Countries: Germany; Mexico; Romania; United Kingdom
- Languages: English, French, Spanish

Leonora in the Morning Light is a 2025 international co-production directed by Thor Klein and Lena Vurma. The biographical drama portrays the life of British-born surrealist artist Leonora Carrington, focusing on her years in Paris and Mexico. The film stars Olivia Vinall as Carrington and Alexander Scheer as Max Ernst. It premiered at the Filmfest München in June 2025.

== Plot ==
In 1930s Paris, Leonora Carrington (Olivia Vinall) rebels against her aristocratic upbringing and joins the surrealist movement. She encounters artists such as Salvador Dalí and André Breton, and begins a passionate relationship with German painter Max Ernst (Alexander Scheer). As World War II approaches, Carrington faces personal crises and political upheaval. Eventually she flees to Mexico, where she finds artistic freedom and develops her own voice as a painter and writer.

== Cast ==
- Olivia Vinall as Leonora Carrington
- Alexander Scheer as Max Ernst
- Ryan Gage as Edward James
- Cassandra Ciangherotti as Remedios Varo
- Luis Gerardo Méndez as Dr. Luis / Antonio
- Mercedes Bahleda as Peggy Guggenheim
- Dennis Eyriey as André Breton
- Cat Jugravu as Salvador Dalí

== Release ==
Leonora in the Morning Light premiered at the Filmfest München in June 2025 in the CineCoPro competition. It was later distributed in Germany by Alamode Film.

== Reception ==
Kino-Zeit praised the film’s ambitious scope, noting that it “offers a unique look at the fascinating life story of Leonora Carrington.” The review highlighted Olivia Vinall’s performance as “capturing both fragility and strength.”
