= Kathleen Cassello =

American opera singer

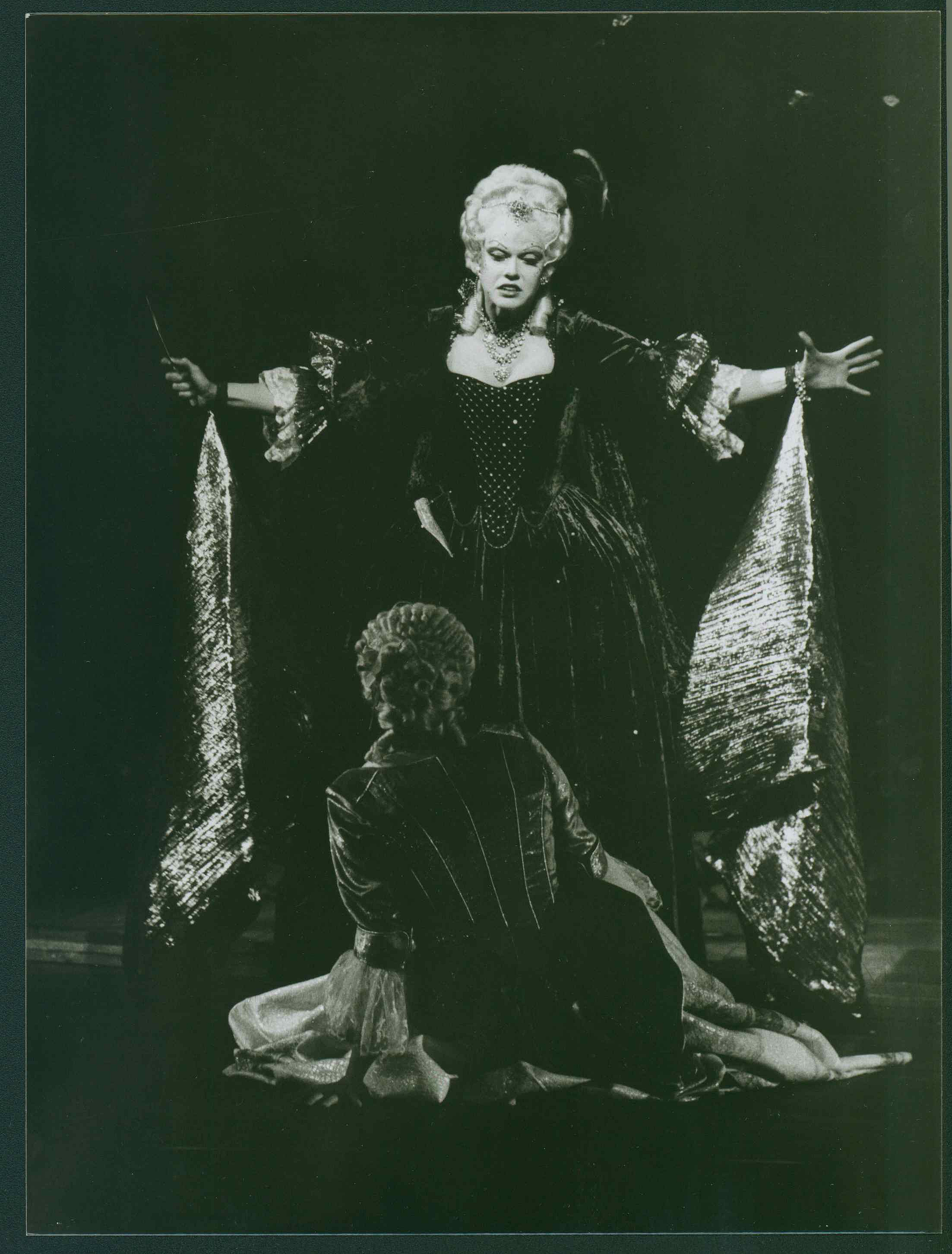

Kathleen Ann Cassello (August 3, 1958, Wilmington, Delaware – April 12, 2017, Munich, Germany) was an American opera singer.

Cassello originally trained to be a nurse, and earned her Bachelor of Science degree in nursing from the University of Delaware in 1980. She practiced nursing from 1980 to 1984. Separately, she privately studied music with vocal teachers Dan Pressley and Nancy Gamble Pressley, from 1980 to 1984. She later studied in Salzburg with Wilma Lipp and Sesto Bruscantini.

Over the period of 1984–1985, Cassello won several singing competitions, in Porto, Vercelli and Barcelona. Cassello won first prize in the Salzburg Mozart competition in 1985. She subsequently sang regularly with the Salzburg Landestheater, over the period 1986–1987. From 1987 to 1990, Cassello was a regular featured artist with the Badisches Staatstheater in Karlsruhe.

Cassello made her American role debut in 1996 as Donna Anna with the Dallas Opera.

In the late 1990s, Cassello toured with Kallen Esperian and Cynthia Lawrence as 'The Three Sopranos'. Cassello is featured on a commercial video recording of 'The Three Sopranos', and also in the documentary 'La Traviata - Love & Sacrifice'.

Cassello was married to the Italian baritone Renato Girolami. She died in Munich, Germany on April 12, 2017, aged 58, from undisclosed causes.

== Sources ==
- 'Soprano Central!' biography of Kathleen Cassello
- Interview with Karen Lotter on 'Sopranos', accessed 28 January 2010
- 'Amerikaanse sopraan Kathleen Cassello overleden (58)'. Opera Nederland blog, 14 April 2017
- Francisco Salazar, 'Obituary: Kathleen Cassello Passes Away At 58'. Opera Word website, 14 April 2017
- Charles Arden, 'Disparition de l'une des "3 sopranos": Kathleen Cassello'. Ôlyrix website, 14 April 2017
