= South of the Circle =

- Developer: State of Play Games
- Publishers: State of Play Games (iOS); 11 Bit Studios (Win, consoles)
- Director: Luke Whittaker
- Producer: John Lau
- Designer: Katherine Bidwell
- Programmer: George Batchelor
- Artists: Ted Grimes; Claire Warren
- Writer: Luke Whittaker
- Composer: Ed Critchley
- Engine: Unity
- Platforms: iOS; Windows; macOS; Nintendo Switch; PlayStation 4; PlayStation 5; Xbox One; Xbox Series X/S
- Release: Apple Arcade; October 30, 2020; Windows, consoles August 3, 2022
- Genre: Adventure
- Mode: Single-player

South of the Circle is an adventure video game developed by State of Play Games. The game follows Peter, a British climate scientist who is stranded in Antarctica during the Cold War. The game was first released for Apple Arcade in October 2020. 11 Bit Studios released the game for Windows and consoles in August 2022. Anton Lesser, Adrian Rawlins, Olivia Vinall, Gwilym Lee, Richard Goulding, and Michael Fox provided voice and motion capture for the game's cast. South of the Circle received generally positive reviews upon release.

== Gameplay ==
South of the Circle is a linear adventure video game played from third-person perspective. In the game, the player assumes control of Peter, a researcher and climatologist at Cambridge University during the Cold War. Players spent most of the time engaging in conversations with non-playable characters, and players can choose Peter's responses to other characters by selecting symbols representing emotions that appear above Peter's head on-screen. If the player does not select any options, the game will automatically select a response for the player. Some dialogue options may change the outcomes of the game.

== Plot ==
=== Cambridge ===
In the early 1960s, climatologist Peter Hamilton struggles with his major dissertation that will promote him to a senior lecturer. He meets Clara McKirrick, a talented academic who chafes under the oppressive sexism at Cambridge at the time. Peter and Clara collaborate on Peter's paper, with Clara contributing a considerable amount of work as well as taking Peter to her family's cottage in the Highlands where they can test Peter's climatological models. However, the conservative atmosphere at the university, as well as the tensions of the Cold War complicate their relationship.

Clara's friend Molly Shanahan, an anti-war activist and member of the Communist Party of Great Britain, is arrested on suspicion of espionage for the Soviet Union following a protest march on London. Although released without charge, her reputation and academic career suffers immensely. Peter's conservative superior, Professor Hargreaves intimates that his association with Clara and therefore Molly may compromise his and the college's prospects as the institution is suffering from the reputational damage caused by the Cambridge Four and of rumours that there may be a fifth spy. Having already earmarked the paper as useful material for national security, he advises Peter to claim the credit for Clara's contributions and sends him to meet an interested official in Whitehall, who in turn offers Peter a blank cheque to pursue his research in Antarctica as well as implicitly observe Soviet operations there, on the condition he leaves Clara behind. It's hinted, though not explicitly shown, that Peter took the offer, leading to falling out with Clara.

=== Antarctica ===
Peter is flown to Antarctica, but his plane crashlands just short of his destination. With his pilot Floyd immobilised in the crash, it falls to Peter to seek help. He reaches Deception Point, his research station, but finds it deserted. Charting a course to what he assumes to be the nearby Norwegian base, he takes the abandoned snow vehicle nearby. To his horror, the base in question actually belongs to the Soviet Union and is also deserted, as well as stripped of all supplies. Peter pushes forward, finding a radioactive mining facility and ultimately a sign of life. To his dismay, this is seemingly the last ship leaving the continent. Depressed and dejected, he makes one last foray to return to Floyd by following flare signals the pilot promised to shoot.

Reaching the landing site, it is revealed it wasn't Floyd but Mikhail, a stranded Soviet engineer, who was sending flares. Mikhail reveals that all signatories of the Antarctic Treaty, which prohibits military use in the Arctic Circle, have all been breaching the treaty by testing military ordinance in the region. A recent British bomb test has apparently caused a landslide that killed two Norwegians, triggering evacuations across all bases. Mikhail also explains that the persistent signals on the radio are warnings by the Soviets for an inbound warhead they had launched to seal their mining facility. Abandoned by their respective authorities and faced with certain death by either exposure or a nuclear warhead, the three men scramble to fix the aircraft and haul fuel from the nearby British base. As they break the cloud line in the soaring plane, they witness the rising mushroom cloud.

== Development ==
A screenshot of the South of the Circle, showing the game's screenprint-inspired visuals.

The game was developed by State of Play Games, the creator of Lumino City. It was influenced by other adventure games such as Firewatch and What Remains of Edith Finch. The Antarctica setting stemmed was inspired by the novel The Amazing Adventures of Kavalier & Clay, which features a scene in which two supposed enemies meeting each other in the desolate Antarctica during World War II. Originally the team wanted to create a game about great explorers visiting Antarctica in the 1930s, though this idea was subsequently scrapped. The team obtained photos of Faraday Station during the 1960s from a mutual friend, and went to King George Island south of Chile to perform research for the game. The game features a minimalistic artstyle. The artstyle was inspired by screen prints during that period. According to Whittaker, he wanted an artstyle "evocative of the mid-century period in which the game was set". The game was powered by Unity.

Anton Lesser, Adrian Rawlins, Olivia Vinall, Gwilym Lee, Richard Goulding, and Michael Fox provided voice and motion capture for the game's cast. The team introduced emotional icons as a way to select conversational options. This was an attempt by the team to establish an emotional connection between the player, the protagonist, and other non-playable characters in the game. While the story explores the life of Peter before and during his adventure in Antarctica, the game also explores other themes such as masculinity, denial, isolation and reliability of memories. The geopolitical tension in Antarctica during the Cold War, and the Antarctica Treaty were also a significant part of the game's narrative.

South of the Circle was announced in September 2020 by State of Play Games. It was released for iOS as an Apple Arcade game on October 30, 2020. PC and console versions of the game was announced by State of Play Games and publisher 11 Bit Studios in April 2022. The game was released for Windows PC, PlayStation 4, PlayStation 5, Nintendo Switch, Xbox One and Xbox Series X and Series S on August 3, 2022.

== Reception ==
According to review aggregator Metacritic, the iOS version of the game received "generally positive" reviews, while the PlayStation 5 version of the game received "mixed or average" reviews. Many critics praised the game's minimalistic artstyle and mature themes as well as the performance of the cast. Some remarked that the experience was light on traditional gameplay, noted its general lack of interactivity, and expressed their disappointment that the choices players made in the game had minimal impact on the story.

During the 24th Annual D.I.C.E. Awards, the Academy of Interactive Arts & Sciences nominated South of the Circle for "Mobile Game of the Year".
