= A Pair of Queens =

EP by Jesse Hughes
- Released: July 2004
- Recorded: 2004
- Genre: Garage rock
- Length: 7:24
- Label: self-released

Shortly after releasing Peace, Love, Death Metal via Eagles of Death Metal, lead singer Jesse Hughes released the two-song EP, A Pair of Queens, on 7" vinyl as a solo project. The EP contains two tracks, both of which are Queens of the Stone Age covers, which lends to the EP title A Pair of Queens.

== Overview ==
According to an interview with Rolling Stone, Hughes reported the inspiration for the release, stating "I was in a hotel room above the Cafe 101 in Hollywood, and a friend of mine was trying to convince me she hadn't heard Queens (of the Stone Age)'s songs," he says. "All I had was my little Roland VS880 recording device, a guitar, and a drum machine. So I recorded two songs ("Go With the Flow" and "Gonna Leave You"). It's proof that no matter how bad you suck, you cannot destroy a well-written song. It's a clear ode to my friend Josh Homme, who is my guitar hero. I look up to him musically and I just wanted to say, 'Man, you rule.' It's also a vanity spite, it's 'I'm owning your song!'"

== Track listing ==
1. Side Boogie: "Go with the Flow" – 4:34
2. Side Woogie: "Gonna Leave You" – 2:50
