= The Woman in White (2018 TV series) =

- Genre: Psychological thriller
- Based on: The Woman in White by Wilkie Collins
- Written by: Fiona Seres
- Directed by: Carl Tibbetts
- Starring: Jessie Buckley; Ben Hardy; Olivia Vinall; Dougray Scott; Charles Dance
- Country of origin: United Kingdom
- Original language: English
- No. of series: 1
- No. of episodes: 5

Production
- Executive producers: David M. Thompson; Sarah Stack
- Producer: Sarah Curtis
- Cinematography: Eben Bolter
- Editor: Helen Chapman
- Running time: 60 minutes
- Production company: Origin Pictures

Original release
- Network: BBC One
- Release: 22 April – 7 May 2018

The Woman in White is a five part BBC television adaptation of the 1860 sensation novel of the same name by Wilkie Collins. The series began airing on BBC One on 22 April 2018, and stars Jessie Buckley, Ben Hardy, Olivia Vinall, Dougray Scott and Charles Dance.

== Cast and characters ==
- Jessie Buckley as Marian Halcombe
- Ben Hardy as Walter Hartright
- Olivia Vinall as Laura Fairlie/Anne Catherick
- Dougray Scott as Sir Percival Glyde
- Riccardo Scamarcio as Count Fosco
- Charles Dance as Frederick Fairlie
- Art Malik as Erasmus Nash
- Joanna Scanlan as Mrs Vesey
- Vicki Pepperdine as Mrs Michelson
- Kerry Fox as Mrs Catherick
- Nicholas Jones as Mr Gilmore
- Ivan Kaye as Professor Pesca
- Sonya Cassidy as Madam Fosco
- Cathy Belton as Mrs Hartright
- Tony Flynn as Mr Merriman, Percival Glyde's solicitor

== Episodes ==
No.	Title	Directed by	Written by	Original release date	UK viewers (millions)
1	"Episode 1"	Carl Tibbetts	Fiona Seres	22 April 2018	6.60
Walter Hartright receives a letter from Frederick Fairlie requesting that he restore his art collection and tutor his nieces at Limmeridge House in Cumberland. Before he leaves for Cumberland, he meets a woman dressed in white, who tells him she used to live at Limmeridge. Shortly afterwards the woman rushes away and boards a coach. Some time later Walter overhears a conversation between a policeman and a coach passenger suggesting that the woman is deranged and has escaped from an asylum. Walter departs the next day for Limmeridge where he meets Frederick, his niece Laura, and her half-sister Marian Halcombe. There is a remarkable similarity between Laura and the woman in white, which Walter mentions to Marian. Marian tells Walter of Anne Catherick, a young lady no longer with them who dressed in white and bore a close resemblance to Laura. Walter then sees the woman in white again in the grounds of Limmeridge House, but she runs away before he can talk to her. Marian realizes that Walter has become very close with Laura and warns him that Laura is engaged to someone else. Laura receives an anonymous letter suggesting that she be very careful to inquire about the past of the man she is to marry. Marian tells Walter that the man's name is Sir Percival Glyde, and that nothing bad has been said of him. A young boy tells them he has seen a ghost dressed in white near the grave of Marian's mother, and Walter decides to wait there in the hope that the woman returns. When she does she reveals to Walter that it was Glyde who had had her put in the asylum and that his intentions were not good. Glyde arrives at Limmeridge to see Laura prior to the wedding.
2	"Episode 2"	Carl Tibbetts	Fiona Seres	29 April 2018	5.27
After meeting Glyde at Limmeridge, Walter reveals to Marian what the woman, now known to be Anne Catherick, had told him about Glyde. Walter and Marian discuss their concerns with the solicitor Mr. Gilmore, who is unsympathetic, saying that Sir Percival is held in high regard but that he would speak to Glyde to clarify the situation. Frederick Fairlie dismisses Walter after being told of Walter's feelings for Laura, insisting that Walter leave immediately. Gilmore meets with Marian and Glyde, who tells them that he knew Anne Catherick when her mother was his family's servant, that he wishes for Anne to be found quickly because she is disturbed and dangerous, and that it was he who had placed her in the asylum at his own expense. Glyde also gives Marian contact details for Anne's mother so that she can confirm that he is a good man. Gilmore is satisfied with this and presses Marian to accept the forthcoming marriage. Laura is still upset about the anonymous letter and now decides she does not want to marry Glyde and tells him she does not love him enough. However, Glyde insists that he will be still be happy to marry Laura. Marian receives a letter from Anne's mother confirming everything that Glyde had told them. Laura and Marian both become resigned to accept the marriage to Glyde. Gilmore becomes alarmed at the hurriedness of the marriage arrangements and the conditions attached to the marriage, which include the control of Laura's estate passing to Glyde. Glyde informs Marian that she will not be joining them on the honeymoon in Italy but that he and Laura will spend the entire three months alone together. At this time Count Fosco, who is an associate of Glyde's and married to Laura's aunt, arrives at Limmeridge to spend time with them and to attend the wedding, which now takes place. After the honeymoon Marian joins Laura and Glyde to live at Blackwater, Glyde's house. Fosco and his wife are already there.
3	"Episode 3"	Carl Tibbetts	Fiona Seres	30 April 2018	4.48
Marian learns from Laura that Glyde has debt problems. He tries to force Laura to sign her legacy over to him without letting her read the document he wants her to sign. With Marian's support she refuses to sign. Marian writes to Gilmore for help, but while Fosco's wife distracts Marian he deceitfully opens the letter and reads its contents. Fosco informs Glyde about the letter. He also suggests that Laura gains confidence from Marian, which leads Glyde to plan to separate them. Marian lets Laura know that she and Walter both suspected that Anne Catherick had written the anonymous letter, and she in turn tells Marian that Glyde had ill-treated her on the honeymoon. Laura storms off into the nearby woods where she comes across Anne who tells her that Glyde had hurt her terribly but she no longer fears him because she is dying; she confirms that she wrote the anonymous letter and that she knows something about Glyde that will ruin him. When Marian returns to Blackwater she is met by Fosco and his wife, who offers her tea that is drugged, and Marian passes out. When Laura returns she finds Marian and rouses her. Fosco tells them that Glyde no longer requires Laura's signature "for the present". They move to the drawing room where Fosco flirts with Marian and dances with her aggressively until Marian breaks from his grasp. The next day, Fosco meets Marian in the plantation and kisses her forcefully, but she runs from him. Laura goes back to where she met Anne hoping to see her only to find a note placed under a rock. As she is about to open it Glyde appears, takes the note from her and destroys it after reading it. He demands to know what Anne has told Laura and beats her but she says nothing. Glyde then locks Laura in her room at Blackwater "for her own good".
4	"Episode 4"	Carl Tibbetts	Fiona Seres	6 May 2018	4.44
Glyde and Fosco discuss how Glyde can gain possession of Laura's fortune, which he needs to resolve his massive debt. Marian suspects Glyde and Fosco of plotting against Laura. As she listens to them from outside the house she is caught in the rain, leading her to contract a fever and the next day to be confined to bed. Laura visits Marian, who tries in vain to tell her not to drink the tea that Fosco's wife is offering. Again the tea is drugged, and Laura passes out. She is woken the next day by Mrs. Michelson, the housekeeper, who tells her that all the servants have gone. Glyde lies to Laura that Marian has gone to London with Fosco to recuperate from the fever. In fact Marian is being held against her will at Blackwater. Laura decides to go to Marian and departs on a train for London where she is met by Fosco. At his house Fosco gives her a drink "to calm her" but it is drugged and Laura passes out. At Blackwater Mrs. Michelson discovers Marian in a wing of the house which is normally kept locked. When Anne Catherick dies from her illness, Glyde and Fosco conspire to have Anne buried as Laura and to have Laura committed to an asylum as Anne, enabling Glyde to inherit Laura's estate. Marian is informed by Frederick Fairlie in a letter that Laura has died. Walter Hartright reappears and joins Marian. A solicitor informs them that Laura died of a weak heart, which Marian refuses to believe. They discover with the help of scrivener Erasmus Nash that a woman named Anne Catherick has been held in a private asylum near London for the past five months. When Marian sees her she realizes that the woman is Laura, not Anne. Using bribery they arrange Laura's escape and take her to see Fairlie but he refuses to accept that she is Laura.
5	"Episode 5"	Carl Tibbetts	Fiona Seres	7 May 2018	4.29
Laura is traumatized after her confinement in the asylum. Walter and Marian continue their efforts to prevent Glyde from inheriting Laura's estate. After visiting Anne Catherick's mother, Walter has suspicions about Glyde's parentage. Marian writes to all churches in the county to request access to the registers. Walter learns that the entry relating to Glyde's parents' marriage is fake, proving Glyde to be illegitimate and therefore to have no right to claim Laura's property. Glyde learns of Walter's visit to Mrs. Catherick and rushes to the registry. He breaks in and in his haste to destroy the records he starts a fire which gets out of control and perishes in the flames. Walter returns to Mrs. Catherick and finds out that Anne was really Laura's half-sister. Glyde forced their father, Philip Fairlie, to have Anne placed in the private asylum and Laura promised to him to him in marriage to avoid scandal and to enable Glyde to inherit Laura's estate in the future. Walter contacts his Italian friend, Professor Pesca, to learn more about Count Fosco. Pesca knew Fosco from the past when they were both part of an underground political organization in Sicily called The Brotherhood, but Fosco betrayed them. Walter contrives for the two to meet, and in vengeance Pesca kills Fosco by cutting his throat with a sword. Walter returns with Marian and Laura to confront Frederick Fairlie and force him to recognize Laura's existence under threat of everything being made public. Walter and Laura are now free to marry.

== Production ==
Filming for the series began in February 2017 in Belfast, Northern Ireland.

== Differences from the novel ==
The script condensed the original novel. In the television production, the character Erasmus Nash (played by Art Malik) was added to achieve some of that condensation. In the book, Walter does all of Nash's detective activities.
