= Jesse Hughes (musician) =

American musician (born 1972)

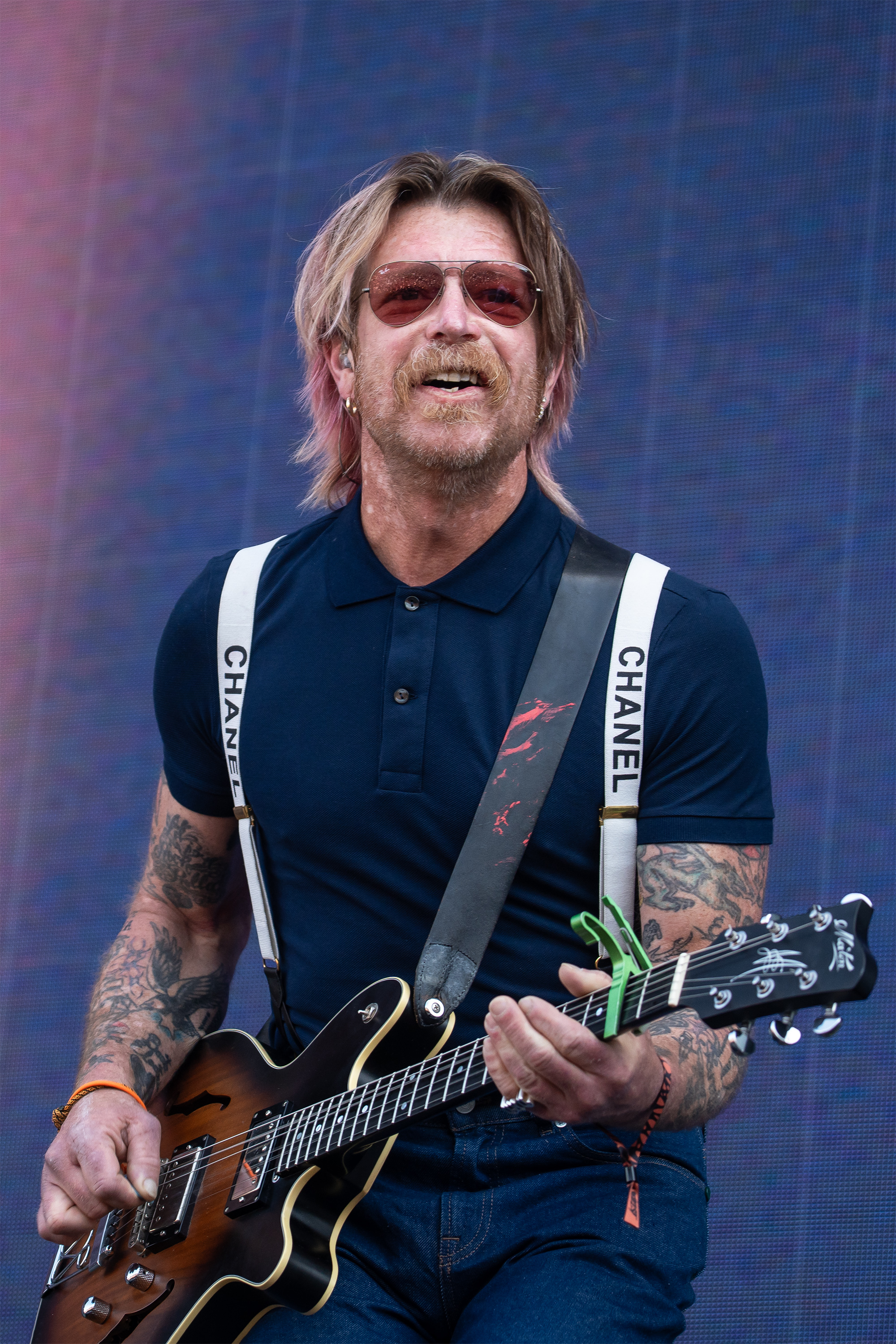
- Hughes performing in 2025

Background information
- Also known as: Boots Electric; J Devil; The Devil; Fabulous Weapon
- Born: Jesse Everett Hughes; September 24, 1972 (age 54); Greenville, South Carolina, U.S.
- Origin: Palm Desert, California, U.S.
- Genres: Garage rock; hard rock; desert rock; rockabilly
- Occupations: Singer; songwriter; musician
- Instruments: Vocals; guitar; bass
- Years active: 1998–present
- Labels: AntAcidAudio; Downtown; MapleMusic
- Member of: Eagles of Death Metal
- Formerly of: The Desert Sessions

Jesse Everett Hughes (born September 24, 1972) is an American singer and musician. He is best known as the frontman of the rock band Eagles of Death Metal, with whom he has recorded four studio albums and a live album. Hughes is also known for his solo career under the moniker Boots Electric.

== Early life ==
Jesse Everett Hughes was born in Greenville, South Carolina, on September 24, 1972. At age seven, he moved with his mother Jo Ellen to Palm Desert, California. In high school, he met Josh Homme, and they became good friends after Homme stopped a bully from picking on Hughes. He graduated from Greenville Technical College with a degree in journalism and worked as the manager of a video depot in Palm Desert for several years.

== Career ==
=== Eagles of Death Metal ===
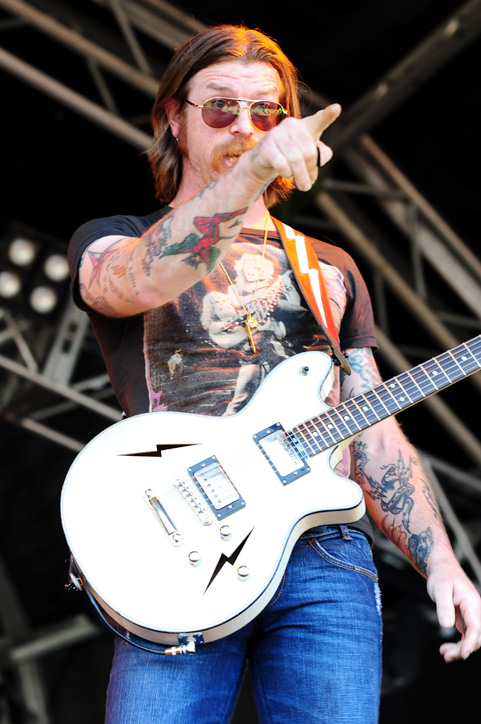
Hughes performing in 2010.

Hughes and Homme formed Eagles of Death Metal in 1998. Hughes credits Homme with saving his life, claiming that during the recording of the second Eagles of Death Metal album Death By Sexy, he fell into serious drug addiction and that Homme not only drove him to rehabilitation, but paid for it as well.

On November 13, 2015, Le Bataclan theatre in Paris was attacked by terrorists while Eagles of Death Metal were performing. The band escaped via the backstage area, but their merchandise manager Nick Alexander was killed. The attacks killed 90 fans at the theatre. Other related attacks occurred in Paris at restaurant terraces that night, for a total of 130 deaths in all, including the Bataclan murders and 1 person killed at the Stade de France in a preliminary attack. Two victims have also committed suicide after these attacks, which raises the official total amount of victims, to 132.

=== Other projects ===
Hughes is one of the characters in the book Sex Tips from Rock Stars by Paul Miles published by Omnibus Press in July 2010.

In September 2011, Hughes released Honkey Kong, his first solo album under the nickname Boots Electric. It was released on Dangerbird Records.

In 2015, Hughes appeared in the Björn Tagemose-directed silent film Gutterdämmerung alongside Iggy Pop, Grace Jones, Lemmy, and Henry Rollins.

In 2017, Hughes starred in the Colin Hanks directed documentary Eagles of Death Metal: Nos Amis (Our Friends) about the November 13, 2015, terrorist attack in Paris that claimed 89 lives at the Eagles of Death Metal's Bataclan Theatre concert. The documentary also features Josh Homme and Bono.

In 2020, MUSE TV and Culturally Obsessed announced Hughes as their Senior Reporter.

In 2021, Memphis musician Muck Sticky and Hughes collaborated and released a song and music video, Stir Crazy.

In 2021, Eagles of Death Metal announced their 24th anniversary tour.

Jesse Hughes collaborated with The Frst on the track “Murderabilia,” released on 2 August 2023.

== Musical equipment ==
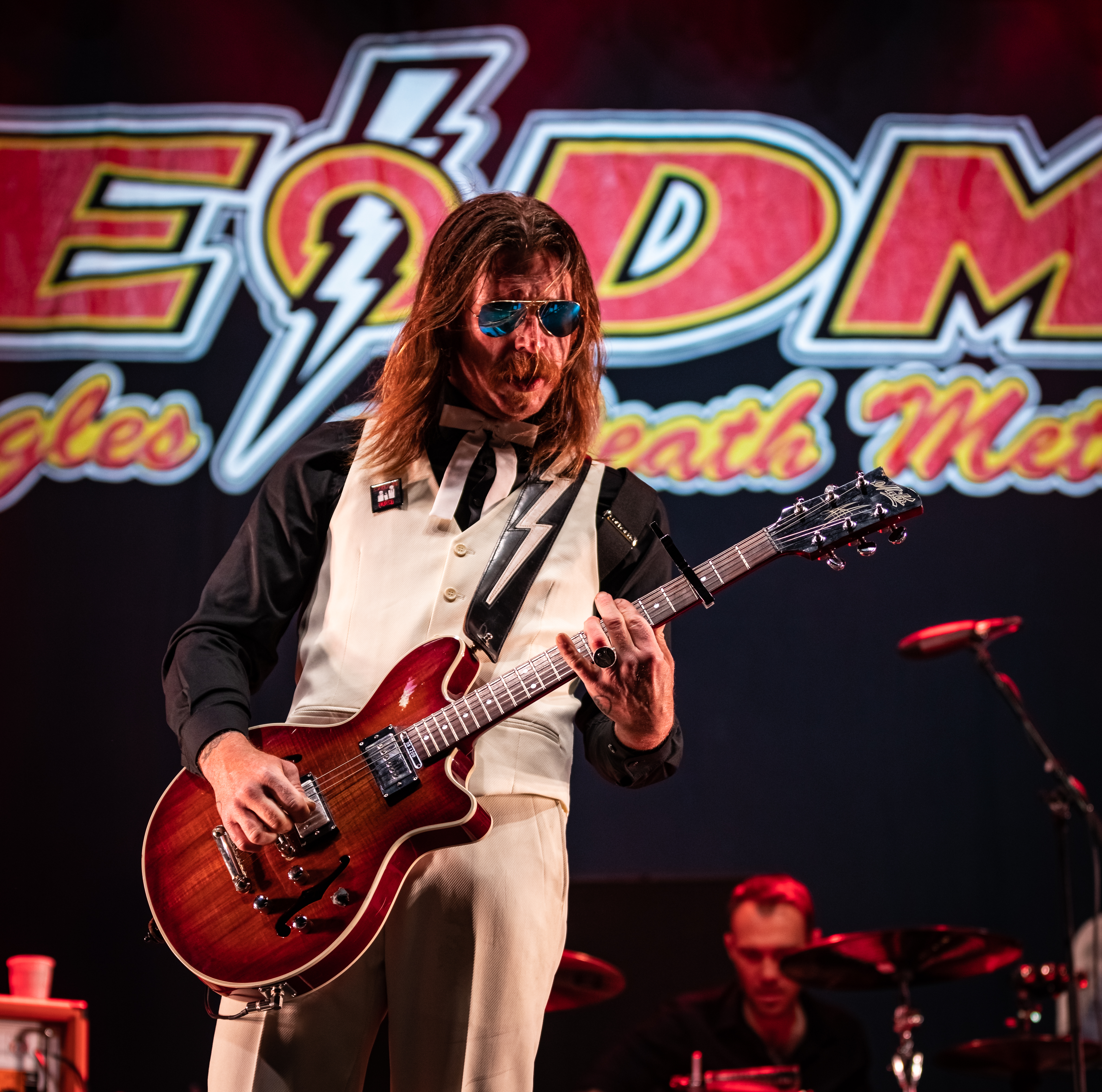
Hughes performing with Eagles of Death Metal in June 2019

Hughes is currently endorsed by Maton guitars and Orange amplifiers.

=== Guitars ===
- Maton MS500 Electric
- Maton BB1200 Electric
- Maton EAJ85 Jumbo Acoustic
- Yamaha AES1500
- Custom Gretsch Duo Jet

=== Effects ===
- Ernie Ball Wah Pedal
- Boss DD-6 Delay
- TC Electronic Nova Drive Overdrive/Distortion
- Boss TU-2 Tuner
- EHX Mini Q Tron
- EHX Deluxe Memory Man Classic Chassis
- MOOG MF-102 Moogerfooger Ring Modulator
- MXR Phase 100
- Boss BF-3 Flanger
- Ibanez TS808 Tube Screamer
- Vox V8474 Wah
- Custom L.A. Sound Design Pedalboard

=== Amplifiers ===
- Orange Rockerverb 50w combo
- Orange 4x12 Cabinet
- Laney Amplifier

== Personal life ==
Hughes uses many different nicknames, including "J. Devil", "The Devil", "Boots Electric", and "Fabulous Weapon" (the latter two being band names used by his father). In November 2008, he revealed that his bandmate Josh Homme gave him "The Devil" nickname when he was 14: "I used to get picked on a lot, and when I would get picked on severely, or if it really made a point to me, I would get vengeance, but I would get vengeance in the way that I could, which was mostly clever and all consuming. Joshua once witnessed me in the moment I was about to enact vengeance upon someone, and he just said, 'You're the fucking devil dude,' and it stuck."

In a November 2008 interview, Homme described himself and Hughes as "socially liberal but government conservative guys". Hughes' political views became more right-wing over the following years, and he revealed in December 2014 that he had even "wanted to be a Republican politician" in his youth. He has described himself as a "proud Zionist".

== Controversies ==
In October 2015, the documentary The Redemption of the Devil gave a behind-the-scenes look at Hughes' life. While generally well-received, the documentary mostly gained attention for Hughes' erratic behavior, which included beginning a relationship with a former porn actress and getting ordained as a minister with the Universal Life Church.

In February 2016, Hughes made a series of controversial statements blaming Islam, liberal values, and French gun control laws for the November 2015 Bataclan attack, as well as claiming that Muslims "[celebrated] in the streets" during the attack. He also speculated that it was an inside job, claiming that security personnel who did not report to the venue that day "had a reason not to show up". He and his band were then dropped from the lineup of two French music festivals. Bataclan management said that Hughes and his manager were refused entry to the venue when he tried to visit on the anniversary of the attack. This has been denied by the band's manager Marc Pollack as well as journalists that were at the event.

In January 2017, Hughes' former friend Andrew Julian Vega obtained a restraining order against Hughes after he sent Vega death threats.

In March 2018, Hughes attacked the March for Our Lives protesters on Instagram, calling them "pathetic" and "disgusting vile abusers of the dead". He accused the survivors of the Stoneman Douglas High School shooting who participated in the protest of "exploiting the death of 16 of our fellow students for a few Facebook likes and some media attention" while accusing one of them, X González, of treason. He later deleted the posts amidst widespread criticism and apologized five days later, saying, "I was not attempting to impugn the youth of America and this beautiful thing that they accomplished. I truly am sorry, I did not mean to hurt anyone or cause any harm."

== Discography ==
Year	Band or artist	Album
1998	The Desert Sessions	Volumes 3 & 4
2002	Fatso Jetson	Cruel & Delicious
2004	Eagles of Death Metal	Peace, Love, Death Metal
2004	Jesse Hughes	A Pair of Queens
2005	Queens of the Stone Age	Lullabies to Paralyze
2005	Eagles of Death Metal	Domino Soundtrack "Speaking in Tongues", "San Berdoo Sunburn"
2006	Eagles of Death Metal	Death By Sexy
2007	Eagles of Death Metal	Epic Movie Soundtrack "Don't Speak (I Came to Make a Bang!)"
2008	Eagles of Death Metal	Heart On
2010	Eagles of Death Metal	The Perfect Host Soundtrack "Wannabe in L.A."
2011	Boots Electric (solo artist)	Honkey Kong
2011	Boots Electric (solo artist)	Untitled 4-song 12-inch LP
2011	Eagles of Death Metal	The Cabin in the Woods Soundtrack "So Easy"
2012	Eagles of Death Metal	Silver Linings Playbook Soundtrack "Now I'm a Fool"
2015	Eagles of Death Metal	Zipper Down
2017	Lujuria	Sextorsión "Electricity"
2017	Kesha	Rainbow "Bastards", "Let 'Em Talk"
2018	Eagles of Death Metal	Super Troopers 2 Soundtracks "Got the Power", "Shasta Beast", "Complexity", "Secret Plans"
2019	Boots Electric (solo artist)	Eagles of Death Metal Presents Boots Electric Performing the Best Songs We Never Wrote
2021	Muck Sticky	Stir Crazy
2021	Boots Electric (solo artist)	EODM Presents: A Boots Electric Christmas

== Filmography ==
Year	Title	Role	Notes
2007	Epic Movie	Aslo's Camp Band	
2015	The Redemption of the Devil	Self	
2015	The Damned: Don't You Wish We Were Dead	Self	
2016	Gutterdammerung	Bounty Hunter	
2016	Conan	Self	Emilia Clarke/Jason Jones/Eagles of Death Metal
2016	¡Atención obras! (TV Series)	Self	Episode #5.2 (2016)
2016	Desert Age: A Rock and Roll Scene History	Self	
2017	Eagles of Death Metal: Nos Amis (Our Friends)	Self	
2019	Stellar Moto Brand (Video short)	Daredevil	
