= Gutterdämmerung =

- Film poster
- Directed by: Björn Tagemose
- Written by: Björn Tagemose
- Produced by: Katarina Vercammen
- Starring: Iggy Pop; Grace Jones; Henry Rollins; Lemmy; Nina Hagen; Tom Araya; Slash; Jesse Hughes; Olivia Vinall
- Music by: Alain Johannes
- Production companies: Gun Productions, Shoot The Artist Films
- Release date: 6 May 2016 (Berlin)
- Running time: 120 minutes
- Country: United States
- Language: English

Gutterdämmerung is a 2016 rock music film directed by Björn Tagemose, promoted as being "the loudest silent movie ever". The film features a score provided by a live rock band. The film stars Iggy Pop, Grace Jones, Henry Rollins, Lemmy, Nina Hagen, Tom Araya, Slash, Jesse Hughes, and Josh Homme and Justice. The film is shot in black and white in the tradition of classic silent film of 1920's Hollywood, but instead of having backing piano music, a live rock group hammers out the accompanying soundtrack, whilst special effects from the film explode to life all around the audience. The film's plot has a religious setting and is focused around "The Devil's Evil Guitar" which has been removed from the world by the supreme being, in a newly puritanical world where rock and roll is relegated to history. Grace Jones plays "the devil", governing the testosterone of the evil rock'n'roll masses. Henry Rollins stars as the puritanical Priest Svengali. A punk rock angel named Vicious (Iggy Pop) is sent to Earth to test humanity and to set the world on fire.

== Cast ==
- Iggy Pop as Vicious
- Grace Jones as Death/The Devil
- Henry Rollins as Priest Svengali
- Lemmy as General
- Nina Hagen
- Tom Araya as the burning man
- Slash as The Thief
- Olivia Vinall as Juliette
- Jesse Hughes Bounty Hunter
- Ben Foster as Ben Foster
- Josh Homme (as Joshua Homme)
- Mark Lanegan as Gravedigger
- Thomas Law as Pete the Mod
- Laurie Kynaston as The Kid
- Hilde Van Mieghem as Soeur Geraldine
- Enoch Frost as Voodoo Leader
- Kirstie Oswald as Soeur Gentile
- Tuesday Cross as Billy (Tight bassist)
- Volbeat (band)
- Justice (band)
- Ozark Henry
