= Muck Sticky =

American musician, songwriter, actor and artist

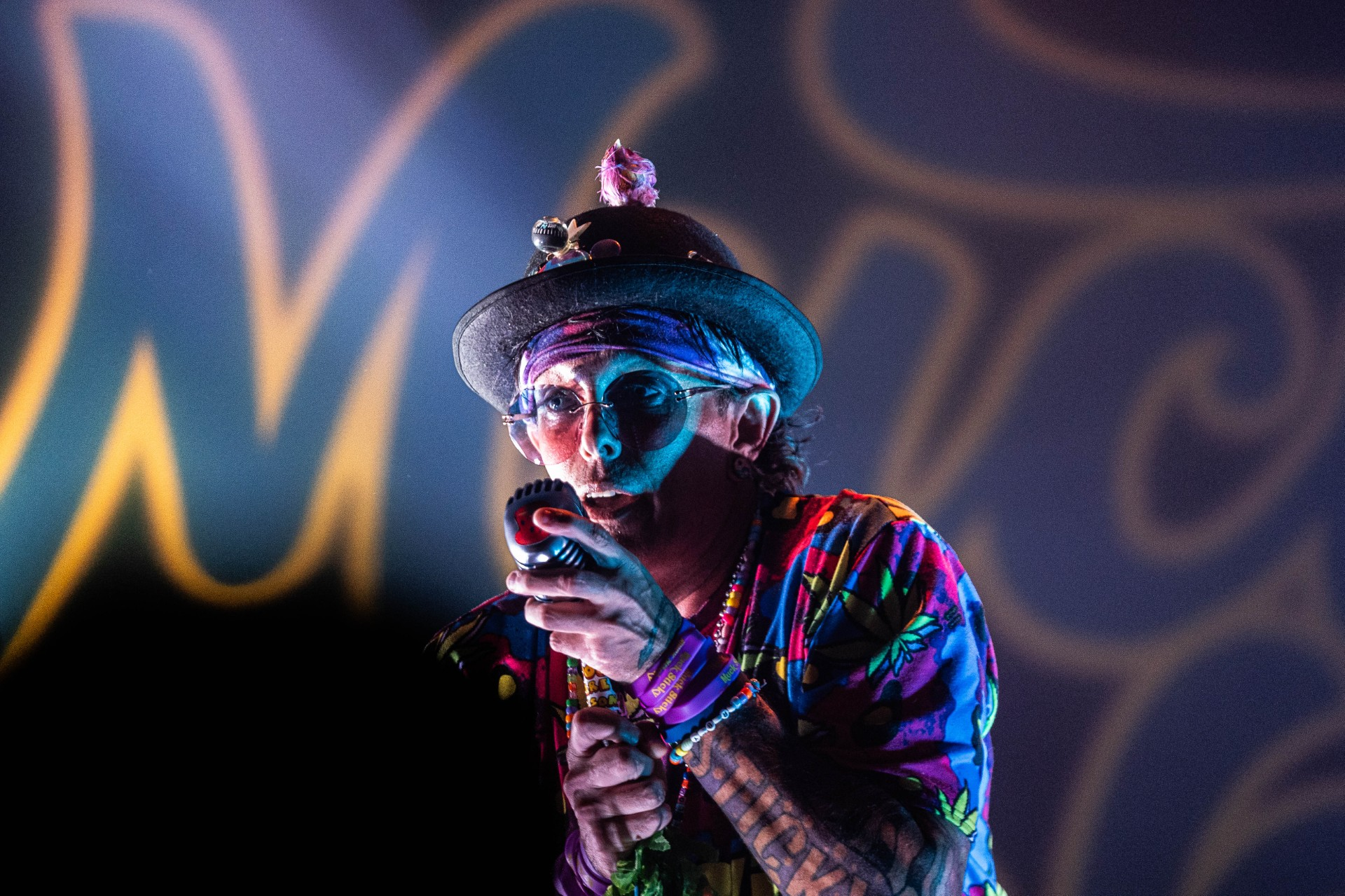
- Muck Sticky in Memphis, Tennessee on April 20, 2024

Background information
- Also known as: Sticky Muck, Mervous Thrifty
- Born: Justin Michael Osburn; October 29, 1977 (age 48); Memphis, Tennessee, U.S.
- Genres: Hip hop, comedy hip hop, dirty rap, country rap, underground hip hop
- Occupation: Musician
- Instruments: Guitar, Bass, percussion, Keys, Tambourine, Harmonica, Banjo, Sitar
- Years active: 2004–present
- Label: Stay Lifted Records

Justin Michael Osburn (born October 29, 1977), known by his stage name Muck Sticky, is an American musician, songwriter, actor and artist. Muck Sticky has self-released thirty-two albums since 2004, and was featured on the MTV series, $5 Cover. His music, videos, and live performances make use of self-aware humor and outrageous costumes lampooning the cannabis culture.

== Career ==
Born and raised in Memphis, Tennessee, Muck Sticky comes from a long line of musicians. His great-grandparents founded one of the first gospel bluegrass quartets in 1929 known as The Wayfaring Strangers, and both of his grandfathers were well known musicians. One was Gene Lowery of The Dixie Four who often recorded at Sun Studios in Memphis, and sang backing vocals for artists like Elvis Presley, Johnny Cash, Jerry Lee Lewis and Charlie Rich.

Between the ages of 16-23, Sticky was employed in many different fields including carpentry, restaurant service, bricklaying, water park lifeguard, and ice cream truck driver. In the year 2000, with the money he earned from his manual laborer job at a local convention service company, he bought an 8-track recorder and began creating his first album. In January 2001, he gave his first live performance at a “Battle of the Bands” concert in his hometown Memphis, TN. Since Sticky recorded all of his music alone, he decided to attach wigs, hats, sunglasses, and instruments to 6-foot tall floor lamps and call them his “band”. To this day he frequently brings them on stage during his shows, but the show has grown to include his mother, sister, best friends, and his fans.

Sticky was featured on the MTV series $5 Cover, which centers around the careers of singers from the Memphis, TN area. The show is produced by Craig Brewer, director and writer of the 2005 movie, Hustle & Flow.

He has released a feature film entitled Muscadine Wine.

A review described Sticky as an artist who "comes across as a backwoods midpoint between Beck and Mungo Jerry...somewhere between Slim Shady and Weird Al."

=== Viral success and chart positions (2021–present) ===
Beginning in 2021, Muck Sticky experienced a resurgence in popularity through short-form video platforms. In early 2024, his track "Fuck Off" achieved significant digital sales, peaking at #3 on the U.S. iTunes Hip Hop chart. For the week of February 24, 2024, the song debuted at #9 on the Billboard Rap Digital Song Sales chart.

=== Personal style and "Pajama Record" ===
Muck Sticky is known for wearing pajama pants as his exclusive attire for both personal and professional appearances. On May 27, 2024, he documented reaching a milestone of 8,000 consecutive days (approximately 22 years) of adhering to this dress code, a streak that began on July 2, 2002.

== 2024 Guinness World Record ==
On June 28, 2024, Muck Sticky officially released ten full-length studio albums on the same day. The event was recognized by Guinness World Records as the record for the most albums officially released on the same day by the same musical act, with ten albums confirmed.

== Discography ==
- The Nifty Mervous Thrifty (2004)
- The Sticky Muck (2005)
- Muck Sticky Wants You (2006)
- Bobolink Cove (2007)
- Muck Sticky Is My Friend (2008)
- The Best of 5 (2010)
- For the Kids (2010)
- Get This! (2011)
- Happy Trees (2012)
- The Blue Album (2013)
- Feel the Vibe (2014)
- Stuck on Earth (2016)
- Galactic Groove (2018)
- Positive Energy (2020)
- 2024 Record Release (June 28, 2024):
  - Mucky (2024)
  - Freakydelic (2024)
  - Bonkers (2024)
  - Life Is a Dream (2024)
  - Sail to the Moon (2024)
  - Feed the Rhythm (2024)
  - Happy Creature (2024)
  - Gravitational Pull (2024)
  - Eternal Dedication (2024)
  - The Muckership (2024)

== Collaborations and guest appearances ==
Muck Sticky is noted for an eclectic range of creative partnerships, frequently crossing genres between hip hop, classic rock, and country music.

=== Notable musical collaborations ===
- Jason Mewes: In October 2023, Muck Sticky collaborated with actor Jason Mewes (of the Jay and Silent Bob duo) on the single "Kick The Beat". Mewes recorded his guest verse at Muck Sticky's home studio, "The Muckership".
- Jesse Hughes (Boots Electric): In 2021, Muck Sticky collaborated with Eagles of Death Metal frontman Jesse Hughes on the single "Stir Crazy". The project was accompanied by a behind-the-scenes documentary titled "The Making of Stir Crazy."
- Little River Band: In April 2026, Muck Sticky collaborated with the Australian classic rock group Little River Band on the single "Just Sing Along".
- Jelly Roll: Muck Sticky maintains a long-standing professional relationship with Jelly Roll, dating back to shared tours in the early 2010s. The two held a public reunion in June 2025 during the Orlando stop of Jelly Roll's Big Ass Stadium Tour.
- G. Love & Special Sauce: In 2026, Muck Sticky performed the song "Rainbow" live with G. Love and Kevin of The Ries Brothers at Reggae Rise Up Florida.

=== Guest appearances ===
Year	Song Title	Primary Artist	Album / Release	Ref.
2006	"Aristocrunk"	Lord T & Eloise	Aristocrunk	
2008	Multiple Tracks	Lil Wyte	Cocaine and Kush (Mixtape)	
2008	"Poppin Tags" (Remix)	Al Kapone	Upcoming Release	
2010	Multiple Tracks	Lil Wyte	Wyte Christmas 2010 (Mixtape)	
2011	"Party Animal"	Taco & Da Mofos	Single	
2012	"Wash Your Hands"	JDirty (feat. Mac Lethal)	Employees Must Wash Hands Before Returning to Work	
2013	"Like to Know Ya"	Taco & Da Mofos	Single	
2013	"What's My Damn Name"	Taco & Da Mofos	Single	
2015	"Flat Bills and Pajama Pants"	JDirty	Rapping for Dummies	
2019	"Like This" / "Ballin On Them Haters"	Al Kapone	Singles	
2022	"Real Good Day"	Cam Carter	Single	
2023	"Droppin Heat"	Blind Fury	Single	
2024	"Give It All Away"	G. Love	Single	
2024	"You Could Change"	Seedsquatch	Single	
2024	"STFU"	PNSNV	Single	
2024	"Drug Deal"	The Michigan Misfits	Single	
2025	"Mucked Up"	Blind Fury	Single	
2025	"Pocket Fulla Prerolls"	Bonzai!	The Pre-Game	
2026	"Just Sing Along"	Little River Band	Single	

== Films ==
Muscadine Wine: The Strength of a family (2013)
Dig that, Zeebo Newton (2018)
