= Olivia Vinall =

English actress

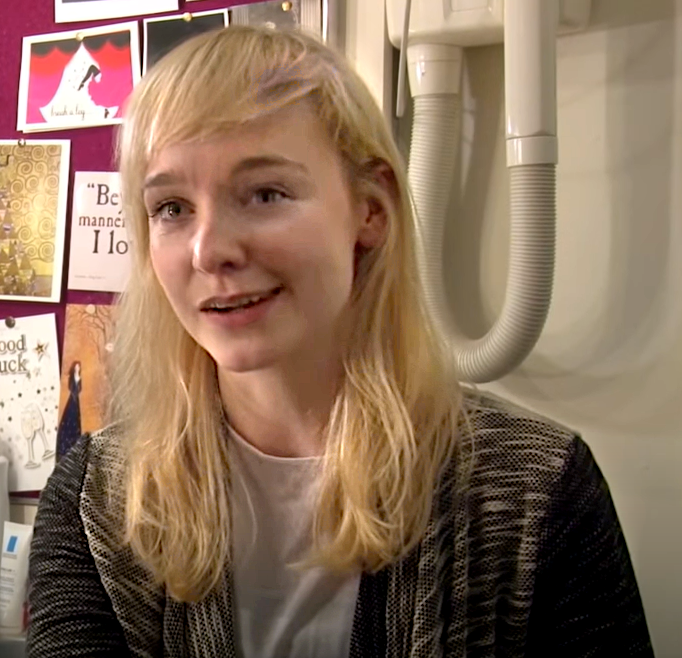
- Olivia Vinall in 2015
- Born: 1988 or 1989 (age 37–38); Brussels, Belgium
- Education: University of East Anglia (BA (Hons))
- Occupation: Actress
- Years active: 2011 – present

Olivia Vinall is an English actress known for her roles in Apple Tree Yard (2017), The Woman in White (2018) and as Detective Matilda Stone in Queens of Mystery in 2019.

== Early life ==
Olivia Vinall was born in Brussels, Belgium but spent part of her childhood in London and Washington DC. Vinall lived most of her early life in Belgium, attending secondary school there, moving to Washington DC for five years.

Vinall studied drama at the University of East Anglia and graduated in 2010 with a First Class BA (Hons) Degree in Drama before going on to further her education at the Drama Studio London. Vinall has performed at the National Student Drama Festival (NSDF) and is an NSDF alumna.

== Theatre ==
In 2010, Vinall's first appearance on stage was in a production of Romeo and Juliet. Further theatre work 2013 included playing Desdemona in Othello, and in 2014, Vinall starred as Cordelia in Sam Mendes's King Lear at The Royal National Theatre. In 2015, Vinall took centre stage again at National Theatre Live in Tom Stoppard's play The Hard Problem as Hilary. In 2015, Vinall was nominated for Best Supporting Performance for playing Nina in Anton Chekhov's The Seagull where she performed at Chichester Festival Theatre and when the production was transferred to the National Theatre.

== TV and film ==
Vinall's first television appearance was as Cassie Lock in the episode Cupcakes in Doctors in 2011. In 2013, she starred as the heroine Juliette in the rock musical Gutterdämmerung alongside rock stars such as Iggy Pop, Grace Jones, Lemmy and Slash. In 2017, Vinall starred in the BBC's Apple Tree Yard, where she played Carrie alongside Emily Watson. Vinall also starred as Arlette in the 2017 ITV television drama Maigret in Montmartre opposite Rowan Atkinson who played Maigret.

In 2018, she starred in the Amma Asante-directed romantic war drama arthouse film Where Hands Touch playing Hermine, a Jewish girl in Nazi Germany, alongside Abbie Cornish and Christopher Eccleston. In the same year, Vinall played two characters; asylum patient Anne Catherick and also Laura Fairlie in the BBC period drama adaptation of Wilkie Collins’ The Woman in White, alongside Charles Dance. In 2019, Vinall took lead role as Detective Matilda Stone in six episodes (three two-part stories) of the Acorn TV comedy-drama murder-mystery series Queens of Mystery

Vinall played the role of Sophie in Hermione Sylvester directed short film Fuel which had its international premiere at the 2020 Arrow London FrightFest Film Festival, an event which was held online because of the COVID-19 pandemic. Vinall played the role of Julia Blythe, the Principal Private Secretary to the Prime Minister (played by Helen McCrory) in the BBC political thriller television series Roadkill in 2020.

Vinall played the role of Stella in the modern romantic film A Beautiful Curse in 2021, where she is struck down by a form of sleeping disorder. The Martin Garde Abildgaard directed film premiered at the Cinequest Film & Creativity Festival in 2021.

== Filmography ==
=== Film ===
| Year | Title | Role |
|---|---|---|
| 2016 | Gutterdämmerung | Juliette |
| 2018 | Lungs (Short) | Claire |
| 2018 | Where Hands Touch | Hermine |
| 2019 | Fuel (Short) | Sophie |
| 2019 | Salt (Short) | Olivia |
| 2019 | Vert (Short) | Jem |
| 2021 | A Beautiful Curse | Stella |
| 2023 | Soft Facts (Short) | Maia |
| 2024 | Truth Serum (Short) | Abbie |
| 2024 | Not Dark Yet (Short) | Lucy |
| 2025 | Leonora in the Morning Light | Leonora Carrington |

=== Live streaming theatre ===
| Year | Title | Role | Notes |
|---|---|---|---|
| 2013 | National Theatre Live Othello | Desdemona | Via satellite |
| 2014 | National Theatre Live King Lear | Cordelia | Via satellite |
| 2015 | National Theatre Live The Hard Problem | Hilary | Via satellite |

=== Television ===
| Year | Title | Role | Notes |
|---|---|---|---|
| 2011 | Doctors | Cassie Lock | 1 episode Cupcakes |
| 2012 | Casualty | Georgia Saddler | Season 27, episode 4 An Amateur Sport |
| 2013 | Doctor Who | Effie | 1 episode The Crimson Horror |
| 2014-2015 | Holby City | Lisa Chad | 3 episodes |
| 2016 | Midsomer Murders | Kim Fosse | 1 episode - Breaking the Chain |
| 2017 | Maigret in Montmartre | Arlette | TV film |
| 2017 | Apple Tree Yard | Carrie | 4 episodes |
| 2018 | The Woman in White | Laura Fairlie / Anne Catherick | 5 episodes |
| 2019 | Queens of Mystery | Matilda Stone | 6 episodes |
| 2020 | Roadkill | Julia Blythe | All 4 episodes |
| 2023 | Captain Laserhawk: A Blood Dragon Remix | Dominique and Lucie (voice) | 6 episodes |

=== Audio ===
| Year | Title | Role |
|---|---|---|
| 2019 | Middlemarch (BBC Audio) | Dorothea |

=== Video games ===
| Year | Title | Role |
|---|---|---|
| 2015 | Sword Coast Legends | Illydia Maethellyn |
| 2019 | Battlefleet Gothic: Armada 2 | Autarch Yramahr / Id'artharn |
| 2020 | South of the Circle | Clara |
| 2021 | Bravely Default 2 | Marla - English version |

== Awards and nominations ==
| Year | Award | Category | Nominated work | Result | Ref. |
|---|---|---|---|---|---|
| 2013 | Evening Standard Theatre Awards | Milton Shulman award for outstanding newcomer | Othello | Nominated | |
| 2014 | 14th WhatsOnStage Awards | London newcomer of the year | Othello | Nominated | |
| 2014 | Ian Charleson Awards | Outstanding performances by actors under 30 in classical roles | Othello | Nominated | |
| 2015 | UK Theatre Awards | Best Supporting Performance | The Seagull | Nominated | |
| 2018 | Screen International | Stars of Tomorrow | (Career so far) | Won | |
