= Honkey Kong (Boots Electric album) =

Studio album by Boots Electric
- Released: September 20, 2011
- Recorded: April 2010 – April 2011
- Genre: Alternative rock
- Length: 32:04
- Label: Dangerbird
- Producer: Boots Electric; Money Mark; Tony Hoffer; Chris Reynolds

Honkey Kong is a 2011 solo album by Eagles of Death Metal front man Jesse Hughes, under the pseudonym Boots Electric on Dangerbird Records. The album was released in September 2011, with the band playing their first live show one month prior. "Oh Girl", "Complexity" and "I Love You All the Thyme" were later reworked and released on Eagles of Death Metal's 2015 album Zipper Down (with the latter renamed "I Love You All the Time").

== Track listing ==
All tracks are written by Jesse Hughes and Mark Nishita, except where noted.

No.	Title	Writer(s)	Length
1.	"Complexity"		2:56
2.	"Love You All The Thyme"		3:39
3.	"Boots Electric Theme"		3:38
4.	"Dreams Tonight"	Jesse Hughes	3:20
5.	"No Ffun"		2:49
6.	"Oh....Girl!"		3:50
7.	"Speed Demon"	Jesse Hughes	3:50
8.	"You'll Be Sorry"		3:16
9.	"Trippy Blob"		2:32
10.	"Swallowed By The Night"	Jesse Hughes	2:14
Total length:			32:04

== Personnel ==
- Boots Electric – vocals, guitars (1–3, 6, 7, 10), bass (1, 2, 6–8), synthesizer (1), keyboards (4), production (1–3, 5, 6, 8–10), engineering, art and layout
- Money Mark – organ (1, 5), piano (1, 2, 5, 6, 10), backing vocals (1, 2), guitar (2), synthesizer (2), keyboards (3, 6, 8, 9), vocals (6, 8), drums (9), production (1–3, 5, 6, 8–10), engineering
- Roger Joseph Manning, Jr. – synthesizers (1–4, 7, 8)
- Tony Hoffer – synthesizer (1, 2, 4, 8), programming (3–5, 8), keyboards (7), production, mixing, engineering
- Liela Moss – vocals (1, 8), drums (1)
- Brian LeBarton – synthesizer (1, 2), keyboards (6, 8)
- Norm Block – drums (1)
- Brody Dalle-Homme – vocals (3)
- Joey Castillo – drums (2, 3, 5, 6)
- Joshua Homme – guitars (4)
- Troy Van Leeuwen – guitars (4)
- Claude Coleman, Jr. – guitars (4), drums (7)
- Chris Reynolds – drums (4, 10), drum programming (4), production, engineering
- Lizette Cardenaz – guitars (5), bass (3, 5–7, 10), piano (7)
- Omar Omarito – vocals (6)
- Juliette Lewis – vocals (8)
- Howard Jones – vocals (9)
- Jessy Greene – fiddle (10)

== Reviews ==
mxdwn.com gave Honkey Kong a generally favorable review, saying "Despite what Hughes and fellow Eagles of Death Metal member have gone through in the past, the guy still manages to push fresh, exciting, music that sounds simply…effortless. When you’re pushing 40, maybe all you need is a 4/4 beat and a couple fun, life-assuring chords.". rocksound.tv had a mostly positive review, saying, "A blend of electronic beats, keyboard-heavy dance grooves and hip-shaking pop underpinned by distorted guitar lines, this is funky and enjoyable stuff. ‘Speed Demon’ sees his rock ‘n’ roll roots in full blossom, though things take a turn for the worse when he tries his hand at electro-baladry on ‘No Fun’."
