= Lord T & Eloise =

American hip-hop group

- Origin: Memphis, TN
- Genres: Crunk, rap, hip-hop
- Years active: 2006–present
- Label: Independent
- Members: Maurice Eloise XIII, Lord Treadwell
- Past members: DJ Witnesse, Teddy Roosevelt, MysterE

Lord T & Eloise are a crunk rap group from Memphis, Tennessee. Lord T dresses as an 18th-century aristocrat, while Eloise wears a tuxedo and sported a "24-karat" gold skin. The self-proclaimed "intergalactic time travelers" and "horsemen of the Rapocalypse" said they were on a mission to save rap music.

== Musical style ==
Lord Treadwell and Maurice Eloise XIII (aka Lord T and Eloise) dubbed their own unique rap style "aristocrunk", a combination of the terms aristocratic and crunk. Aristocrunk, also the name of their first album, is meant to describe both a philosophical lifestyle as well as the musical genre itself. Many songs from their albums Aristocrunk & Chairmen of the Bored are accompanied by harpsichord and baroque style music, while others stay close to the traditional Memphis crunk sound. Lord T's raps were similar to the slow train lyrical style of Snoop Dogg, Eloise's style drew more comparisons to Chuck D of Public Enemy. Drawing from a diverse palette of influences, the group admitted that the Beastie Boys, David Bowie, Busta Rhymes, The ODB, 8Ball and MJG, Al Kapone had all been influences. While tracks like "Million Dollar Boots" and "Penthouse Suite" have a more refined, classical edge with the incorporation of strings, other tracks like "Pillz" and "Dance Move" have more of a crunk, dirty south edge to them, featuring 808 drums and a heavy bottom end.

== Lyrical content ==
The lyrical content of this band has been praised by critics, who cite the cleverness of the turns of phrase and the catchiness of the hooks. The band's "aristocrunk" lyrics are made up of many rap mainstays, using common themes, such as the supremacy of the artists in the areas of success, sexual prowess, technological savvy and financial know-how (e.g., in the video for "Million Dollar Boots", they are shown with the ticker for the NASDAQ stock exchange displayed across their teeth, in place of a "grill"). Lord T and Eloise are a mixture of performance art, party rap, and social commentary; the group's lyrics cover a range of topics from plastic surgery to the stock market, from time travel to prescription drug use, mixing fun with satire.

== Critical reception ==
Lord T and Eloise have received positive reviews from numerous newspapers and music publications. Accolades have included an "A" from the Memphis Flyer, "Editor's Pick" from Blender Magazine and a review from VH1 that lauded them as "the world's first purveyors of aristocrunk". They have also made appearances on Ellen! and E! Fashion Police. Now signed with R.E.M. and Widespread Panic's booking agency, P.G.A., Lord T & Eloise released their third full-length album, RAPOCALYPSE, in August 2010, with a national tour following.

== Discography ==
- 2006: Aristocrunk
- 2008: Chairmen of the Bored
- 2010: Rapocalypse
