= Memphis Flyer =

Alternative newspaper in Memphis, Tennessee

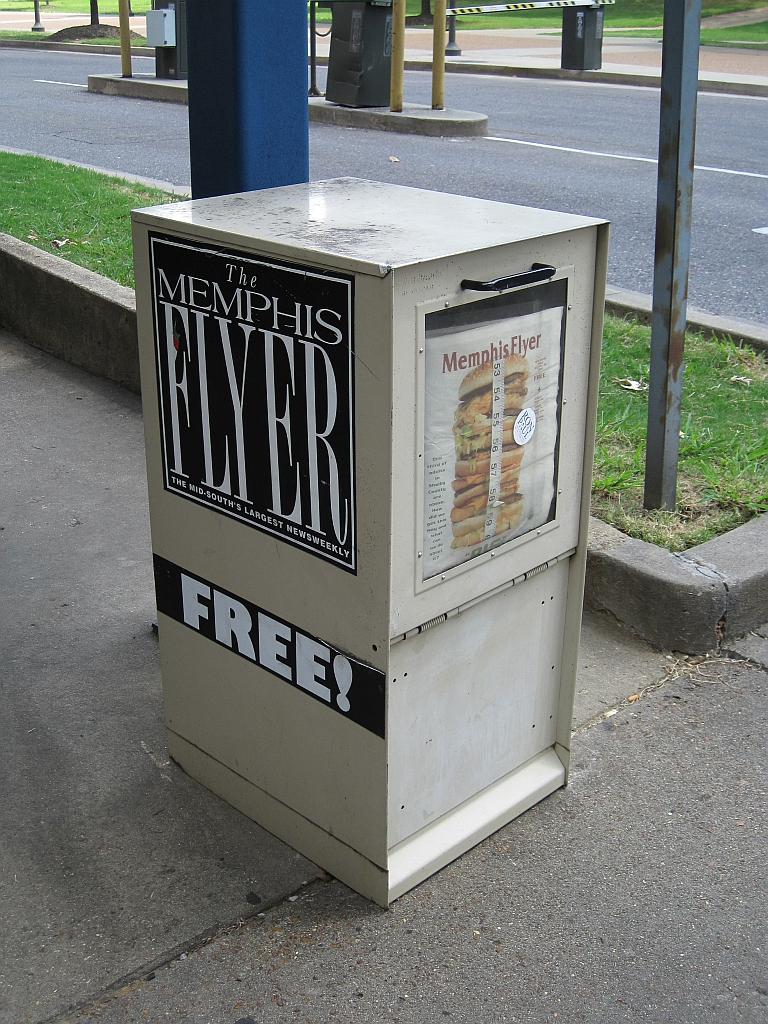
- Memphis Flyer newspaper dispenser at the University of Memphis
- Type: Alternative weekly
- Format: Compact
- Owner: Noisy Creek
- Founder: Kenneth Neill
- Editor: Shara Clark
- Associate editor: Toby Sells
- Managing editor: Samuel X. Cicci
- Staff writers: Michael Donahue, Jon W. Sparks
- Founded: February 14, 1989
- Language: English
- Headquarters: 65 Union Avenue, 2nd Floor; Memphis, Tennessee 38103; United States
- City: Memphis, TN
- Country: United States of America
- Sister newspapers: Memphis Magazine
- OCLC number: 57010949
- Website: memphisflyer.com
- Free online archives: https://issuu.com/contemporarymedia/stacks/fc48c538ed954050beb06a48c4948f60

The Memphis Flyer is a free weekly alternative newspaper serving the greater Memphis, Tennessee, area. The Flyer covers Memphis news, politics, music, entertainment, sports, food, and spirits.

The Flyer is a publication of Contemporary Media, Inc. which also publishes Memphis Magazine, Memphis Parent, and Inside Memphis Business. The current CEO of Contemporary Media is Anna Traverse Fogle.

== History ==
The Flyer was founded February 14, 1989 by Kenneth Neill. The current editor is Shara Clark. She was preceded in the role by Jesse Davis, who took over for Bruce VanWyngarden, the editor of the flyer from 2001-2021, on May 12, 2021.

Traditionally, free publications have used advertisements in order to pay for their publications. With alt-weeklies, that often meant running ads from risqué sources, sometimes including paid escorts. In a 2003 interview, VanWyngarden stated that the Flyer began refusing ads from anyone who was not a "legally licensed business" by the mid 1990s.

In October 2019, Kroger stores stopped allowing free newspapers and magazines to be distributed via their stores. Nationwide, they removed the racks and informed the publications of the change. The Flyer reported at the time that they moved 9,000 papers weekly through Kroger stores alone.

During COVID-19, the Flyer changed to bi-weekly circulation. "We will print the April 2nd issue of the Flyer. Our next print issue after April 2nd will be April 16th, and we will proceed on a biweekly schedule thereafter. We plan to reevaluate our status and the community’s status in June, and to consider ramping back up to a weekly schedule at that time." While cutting back on its circulation, the paper worked to help keep local artists afloat by creating a coloring book campaign. The proceeds were split equally between the contributing artists and the Flyer. The initiative was popular enough to be continued in 2021, but it does not appear to have carried forward.

In July 2026, it was announced the Memphis Flyer and Memphis Magazine would be acquired by Noisy Creek, publishers of the Seattle Stranger and Chicago Reader.
