= Jennie Vee =

Canadian bass guitarist

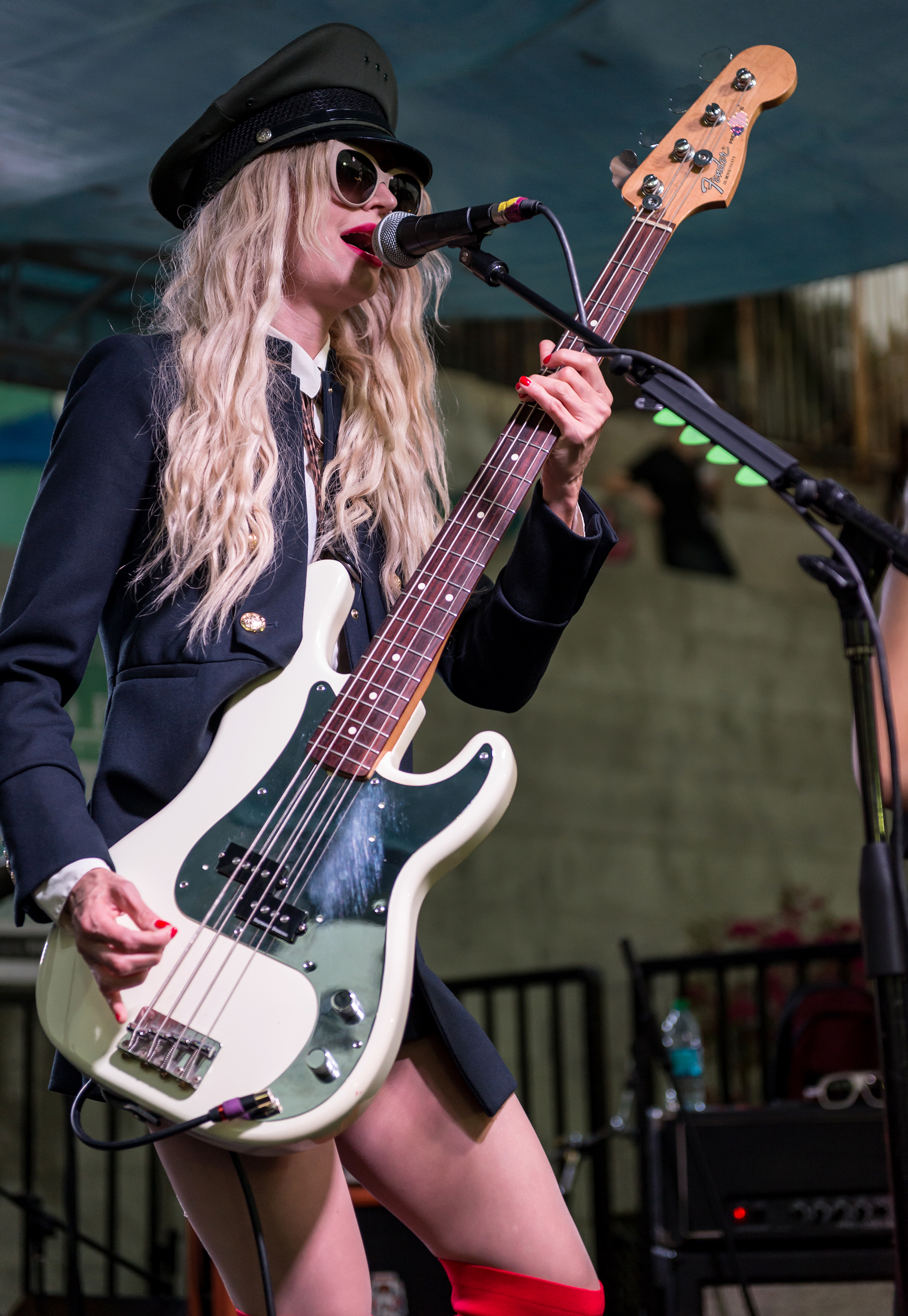
- Vee performing live in Los Angeles in 2017.

Background information
- Born: 20 January 1977 (age 49); Sudbury, Ontario, Canada
- Occupations: Musician; songwriter
- Instruments: Bass guitar; vocals; guitar
- Years active: 1997–present
- Member of: Midnight Cowgirls; Eagles of Death Metal (touring member)
- Formerly of: Tuuli; Palaye Royale
- Spouse: Slim Jim Phantom (m. 2020)
- Website: Official website

Jennie Vee (born January 20, 1977) is a Canadian musician and songwriter. She has released one studio album and two EPs as a solo artist, and is the bassist for Midnight Cowgirls. Vee has previously been a member of the bands Tuuli and Palaye Royale, in addition to touring with Eagles of Death Metal, Courtney Love and Tamaryn.

== Career ==
Vee has described herself as a goth girl growing up in Ontario, Canada and cited The Cure, U2, Echo & the Bunnymen and New Order as major musical influences. During her teens, she left high school and relocated to England to pursue a musical career. Vee returned to Canada in her late teens and formed the Toronto-based band Tuuli in 1997. The band released their debut album in 2002 and had songs featured on Comedy Central and Degrassi: The Next Generation. Following Tuuli's disbandment, Vee moved to Nashville.v

In 2014, Vee relocated to New York City and released her debut solo EP, Die Alone. She was subsequently recruited by Courtney Love to play bass on her Endless Summer tour with Lana Del Rey in 2015. Vee's debut studio album, Spying, was released that same year. In 2017, she released her second solo EP, Suffer, and joined Eagles of Death Metal as a touring bassist. In June 2018, Vee sat in with the 8G Band on Late Night with Seth Meyers for a week. Vee was a member of the rock band Palaye Royale from 2021 to 2022.

In 2024, Vee joined with Kandle Osborne, Leah Bluestein, Rex Elle and Blaise Dahl to form the Midnight Cowgirls.

Jennie Vee collaborated with The Frst on the track “Murderabilia,” released on 2 August 2023.

== Personal life ==
Vee resides in Los Angeles, California as of 2020. She is married to Stray Cats drummer Slim Jim Phantom.

== Discography ==
=== Solo ===
Studio albums

- Spying (2015)

Studio EPs

- Die Alone (2014)
- Suffer (2017)

=== With Tuuli ===
Studio albums

- Here We Go (2002)

Studio EPs

- Hotrods And Honeysuckle (1999)
- Rockstar Potential (2000)

=== With Eagles of Death Metal ===
- EODM Presents Boots Electric Performing the Best Songs We Never Wrote (2019)

=== With Midnight Cowgirls ===
Singles

- Giddy Up (2024)

=== Other appearances ===
- Deap Vally – Marriage (2021)
