= You'll Be Fine =

You'll Be Fine may refer to:

- "You'll Be Fine" (song), a 2018 song by Palaye Royale
- You'll Be Fine (album), a 2020 album by Hot Mulligan
- "You'll Be Fine", a song by Widespread Panic, from the album 'Til the Medicine Takes
