= Marriage (Deap Vally album) =

Studio album by Deap Vally
- Released: November 19, 2021
- Genre: Indie rock, rock
- Length: 38:01
- Label: Cooking Vinyl

Deap Vally chronology
Femejism (2016)	Marriage (2021)

Deap Vally general chronology
Deap Lips (2020)	Marriage (2021)

Singles from Marriage
- 1. "Magic Medicine" Released: October 6, 2021; 2. "Tsunami" Released: November 19, 2021

Marriage is the third and final studio album by American rock duo Deap Vally. It was released on November 19, 2021, via Cooking Vinyl.

The album title alludes to the way both members see their relationship as bandmates; at one point they even attended couples therapy. In order to reduce their sense of boredom with the band, they decided to work with guests. Marriage features collaborations with KT Tunstall, Peaches, Jennie Vee (Eagles of Death Metal), Ayse Hassan (Savages), Jenny Lee Lindberg (Warpaint) and Jamie Hince (The Kills). They have referred to the album as their "rumspringa".

The duo asked the collaborators to feel no pressure, wanting the songs to be free and uncommitted to specific genres. They claim that having released an album with The Flaming Lips (under the moniker Deap Lips) had no influence in the more collaborative approach of Marriage, since the partnerships were already contemplated before Deap Lips.

The album was recorded in several venues around the United States, including Dave Grohl's Studio 606, Allen Salmon's Nashville studio and Josiah Mazzaschi's Cave Studio.

The track "Billions" challenges society's celebration of billionaires and their influence on people's life goals while "Better Run" was inspired by the Harvey Weinstein sexual abuse cases.

== Reception ==
Professional ratings
Aggregate scores
Source	Rating
AnyDecentMusic?	7.5/10
Metacritic	80/100
Review scores
Source	Rating
AllMusic	3.5/5 stars
Mondo Sonoro	7/10
DIY	4/5 stars
The Line of Best Fit	9

According to the review aggregator Metacritic, Marriage received "generally favorable reviews" based on a weighted average score of 80 out of 100 from 4 critic scores.

Mark Deming of AllMusic, wrote that "though Deap Vally have found new ways to dress up their music on Marriage, at their core they haven't changed that much -- this is still a smart, powerful rock band with sharp wit and an abundance of well-deserved confidence -- but the added details and textures make a difference, and this music points to a more interesting future for them than one might have imagined after Femejism."

Writing for Mondo Sonoro, Raul Julián said the band "keeps offering nothing new" and that the album is "unable to have a bigger intention than to entertain", but conceded that they do what they do "very well".

Hannah Broughton, from The Line of Best Fit, considered that "the slower tracks [...] add a new weight to the duo's onslaught" and that "they've successfully pushed themselves to create something a bit different". She concluded her review saying that Marriage "is an impressively balanced album with highs and lows [...] Deap Vally have really come into their own here, encompassing everything you could ask for from a rock album."

Ims Taylor of DIY said "it's immediately evident" that the band is "striking out to a magnitude unreached so far. They said the album "is the sound of Deap Vally tapping back into what makes them tick, and lays the groundwork for their most exciting era yet."

== Track listing ==
No.	Title	Length
1.	"Perfuction"	2:56
2.	"Billions"	2:54
3.	"Magic Medicine"	3:31
4.	"I Like Crime" (featuring Jennie Vee)	3:30
5.	"Phoenix"	2:57
6.	"Give Me a Sign"	2:48
7.	"Better Run"	2:51
8.	"I'm the Master"	3:09
9.	"High Horse" (featuring KT Tunstall & Peaches)	3:25
10.	"Where Do We Go"	2:59
11.	"Tsunami"	2:25
12.	"Look Away" (featuring Jenny Lee Lindberg)	4:36
Total length:		38:01
