= Sistrionix 2.0 =

Studio album by Deap Vally
- Released: February 1, 2024
- Studio: The Cave (Los Angeles)
- Genre: Minimalist rock
- Length: 72:57
- Label: Deap Vally Records
- Producer: Josiah Mazzaschi

Deap Vally chronology
Marriage (2021)	Sistrionix 2.0 (2024)

Deap Vally general chronology
Marriage (2021)	Sistrionix 2.0 (2024)	(Ep)ilogue (2024)

Singles from Marriage
- 1. "Baby I Call Hell" Released: September 19, 2023; 2. "Ventilator Blues" Released: November 2, 2023

Sistrionix 2.0 is the fourth studio album by American rock duo Deap Vally. It was released on February 1, 2024, through the band's own label, Deap Vally Records. The album was produced and engineered by Josiah Mazzaschi, and recorded at his studio, The Cave, in Los Angeles, California.

The album is a track-for-track re-recording of the band's debut album, Sistrionix. In addition to reimagined versions of the original songs (released as "Deap Vally's Version), Sistrionix 2.0 features demos, unreleased covers, and re-recordings of limited-release B-sides, making it a double album.

== Reception ==
Professional ratings
Review scores
Source	Rating
New Noise	4/5 stars
Spill Magazine	3.5/5 stars

Spill Magazine rated the album three and a half out of five, and described it as incorporating "Jack White-tinged blues-rock sound, blended with vigorous youthfulness and a touch of indie." New Noise assigned it a rating of four stars, stating "They rage on all twenty-two tracks, ensuring they end their time with an explosion of unapologetic, raw, feminist-flavored, blues-inspired minimalist rock."

== Track listing ==
No.	Title	Length
1.	"End of the World"	4:57
2.	"Baby I Call Hell"	3:03
3.	"Walk of Shame"	2:22
4.	"Gonna Make My Own Money"	2:25
5.	"Creeplife"	2:22
6.	"Your Love"	3:31
7.	"Lies"	3:08
8.	"Bad for my Body"	2:58
9.	"Women of Intention"	3:41
10.	"Raw Material"	3:57
11.	"Six Feet Under"	6:27
12.	"Spiritual"	2:56
13.	"Ventilator Blues"	4:52
14.	"She's a Wanderer"	2:24
15.	"Ain't Fair"	2:56
16.	"I Put a Spell on You"	3:49
17.	"Drought"	3:29
18.	"Procreate"	2:18
19.	"Hobo Playa"	2:45
20.	"This is My Revolution – 2011 Demo"	2:53
21.	"Baby I Call Hell – 2011 Demo"	3:21
22.	"Creeplife – 2011 Demo"	2:23
Total length:		72:57
