= Matt Doust =

Australian painter (1984–2013)

- Born: Matthew Doust; 20 August 1984; Santa Monica, California, US
- Died: 28 August 2013 (aged 29); Los Angeles, California, US
- Occupation: Painter
- Style: Hyperrealism
- Website: Official website (archived)

Matthew Doust (20 August 1984 – 28 August 2013) was an American-born Australian hyperrealist painter. He was a finalist of the 2011 Archibald Prize, for his portrait of Australian model and actress Gemma Ward. Other notable works include the cover of the Deap Vally album Sistrionix (2013). Doust is the subject of the Mat de Koning documentary film 29 Years Eight Days.

Doust was born in Santa Monica, California, in 1984. He grew up in Perth, Western Australia.

Doust died from an epileptic seizure on 28 August 2013, aged 29, in Los Angeles, California, where he had lived since July 2011.
