= Band (rock and pop) =

Musical ensemble

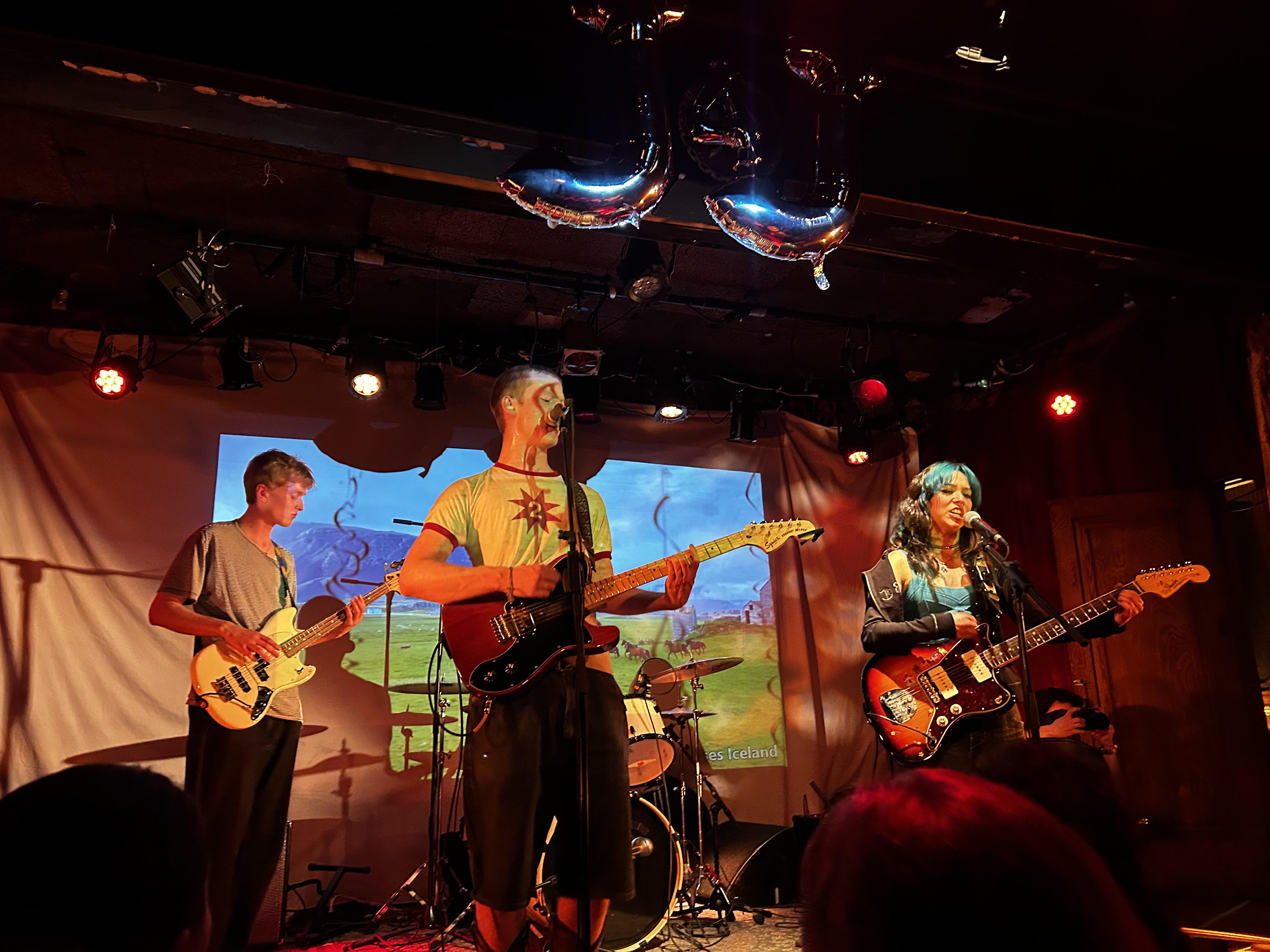
A band plays live music for an audience in Montreal, Canada

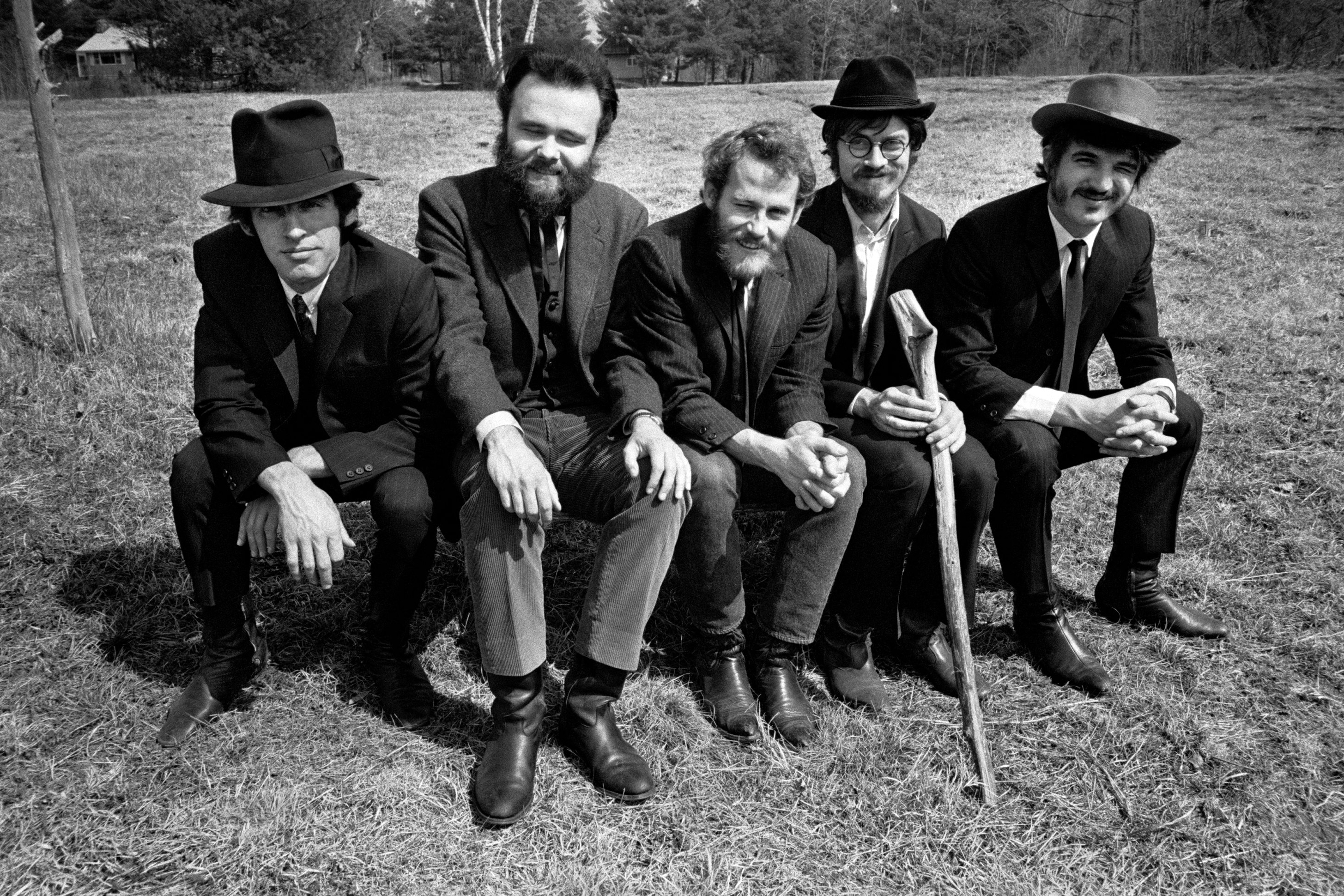
The Band were a Canadian-American rock band formed in Toronto, Ontario, in 1967. They are pictured here in 1969.

A rock band or pop band is a small musical ensemble that performs rock music, pop music, or a related genre. A four-piece band is the most common configuration in rock and pop music. In the early years, the configuration was typically two guitarists (a lead guitarist and a rhythm guitarist, with one of them singing lead vocals), a bassist, and a drummer (e.g. the Beatles and Kiss). Another common formation is a vocalist who does not play an instrument, electric guitarist, bass guitarist, and a drummer (e.g. the Who, the Monkees, Led Zeppelin and U2). Sometimes, in addition to electric guitars, electric bass, and drums, also a keyboardist (especially a pianist) plays.

Some rock and pop bands count as boy bands or girl bands, and often include members who do not play any instruments but sing harmony and dance instead. Such is the case of Menudo, the Spice Girls and K-pop groups, for example.

== Etymology ==
The usage of band as "group of musicians" is first attested in 1659 when it referred to musicians attached to an army regiment and playing marching music. The term one man band was used at least from 1931 to describe a person who plays several musical instruments simultaneously.

== Two members ==
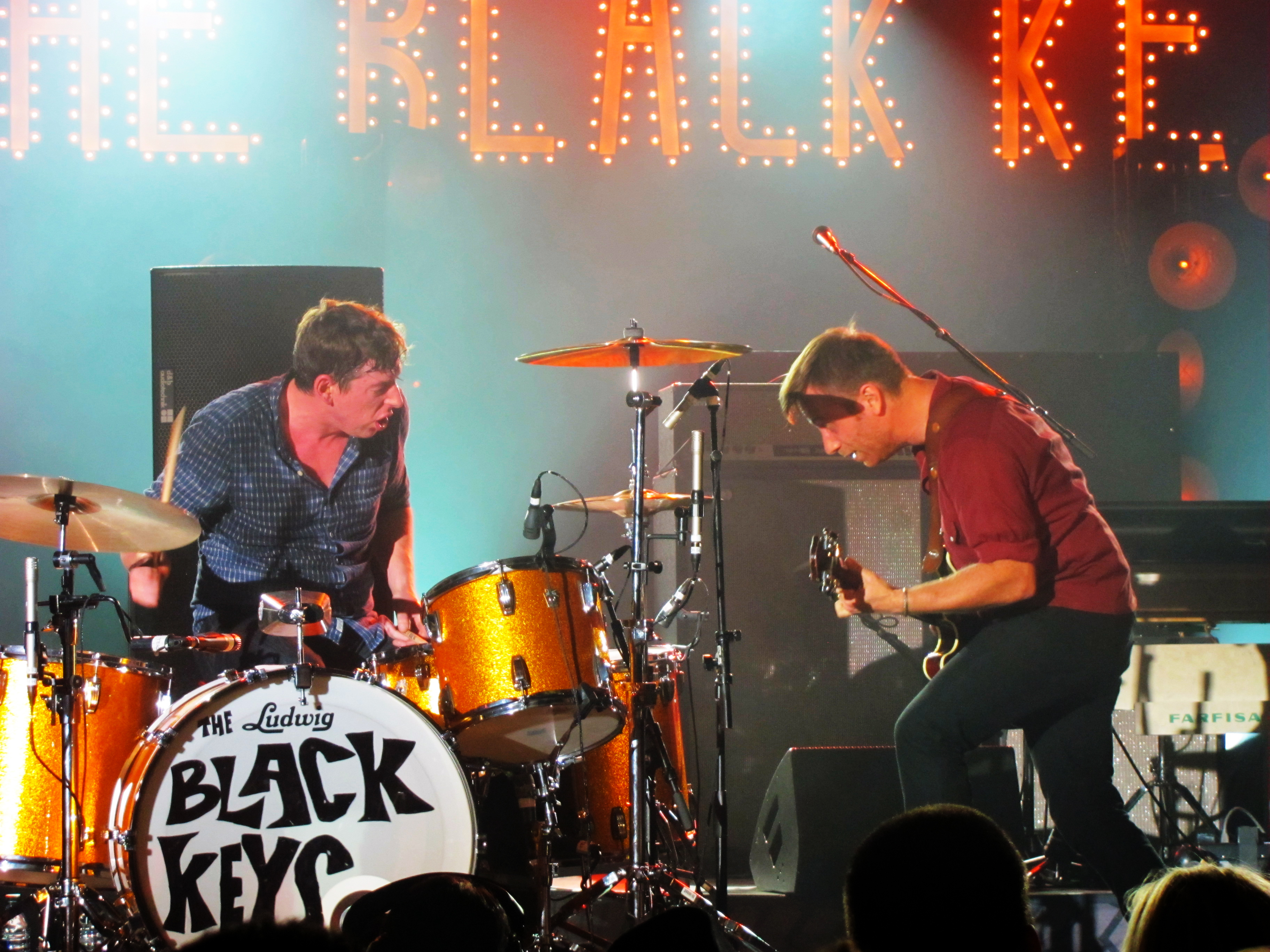
The Black Keys are a two-part band consisting of drummer and a vocalist/guitarist lineup.

Two-member rock and pop bands (such as Steely Dan, Hall & Oates, Soft Cell, Yazoo, Suicide, Pet Shop Boys, Timbuk 3, the Black Keys, The White Stripes, and Twenty One Pilots) are relatively rare because of the difficulty in providing all of the musical elements which are part of the rock or pop sound (vocals, chordal accompaniment, bass lines, and percussion or drumming). Rock and pop duos typically omit one of these musical elements. In many cases, two-member bands omit a drummer, since guitars, bass guitars, and keyboards can all be used to provide a rhythmic pulse.

Other examples of two-member bands are Shakespears Sister, Simon & Garfunkel, Seals & Crofts, England Dan & John Ford Coley, Loggins & Messina, WZRD, The Ting Tings, They Might Be Giants (from 1982 to 1992) and T. Rex (until shortly after scoring their UK breakthrough hit, at which point they expanded to a four-piece and more).

When electronic sequencers became widely available in the 1980s, they made adding in musical elements easier for two-member bands to perform. Sequencers allowed bands to program some elements of their performance, such as an electronic drum part and a synth bass line. Two-member pop music bands such as OMD, Soft Cell and Yazoo used programmed sequencers; OMD were noted as Britian's first performing, two-piece synthesizer group (they later recruited additional members). Other pop bands from the 1980s, who were ostensibly fronted by two performers, such as Wham!, Eurythmics, and Tears for Fears, were not actually two-piece ensembles, because other instrumental musicians were used "behind the scenes" to fill out the sound. Modern bands that use this format include Ninja Sex Party. In the 1990s, Local H continued on as a two-piece when their bassist departed, with guitarist/singer Scott Lucas modifying his guitars by adding a bass pickup for the lower strings.

Starting in the 2000s, blues-influenced rock bands such as the White Stripes and the Black Keys used a guitar-and-drums scheme. Comedy rock duo Tenacious D is a two-guitar band. Heavy metal band W.A.S.P. guitarist Doug Blair is also known for his work in the two-piece progressive rock band Signal2Noise, where he acts as the lead guitarist and bassist at the same time, due to a special custom instrument he invented (an electric guitar with five regular guitar strings paired with three bass guitar strings). Heisenflei of Los Angeles duo the Pity Party plays drums, keyboards, and sings simultaneously. One Day as a Lion and the Dresden Dolls both feature a keyboardist and a drummer. Royal Blood and The Garden are two-piece bands that uses bass and drums along with electronic effects.

== Three members ==
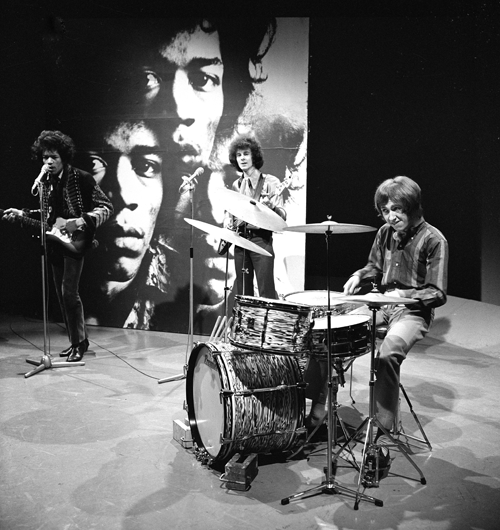
The Jimi Hendrix Experience, a power trio, performing for Dutch television in 1967: From left to right: singer-guitarist Jimi Hendrix, bassist Noel Redding, and drummer Mitch Mitchell

The smallest ensemble commonly used in rock music is the trio format. In a hard-rock or blues-rock band, or heavy-metal rock group, a "power trio" format is often used, which consists of an electric guitar player, an electric bass guitar player, and a drummer, and typically one or more of these musicians also sing (sometimes all three members sing, e.g. the Bee Gees or Alkaline Trio). Some well-known power trios with the guitarist on lead vocals are the Jimi Hendrix Experience, Green Day, Stevie Ray Vaughan and Double Trouble, Nirvana, and Muse.

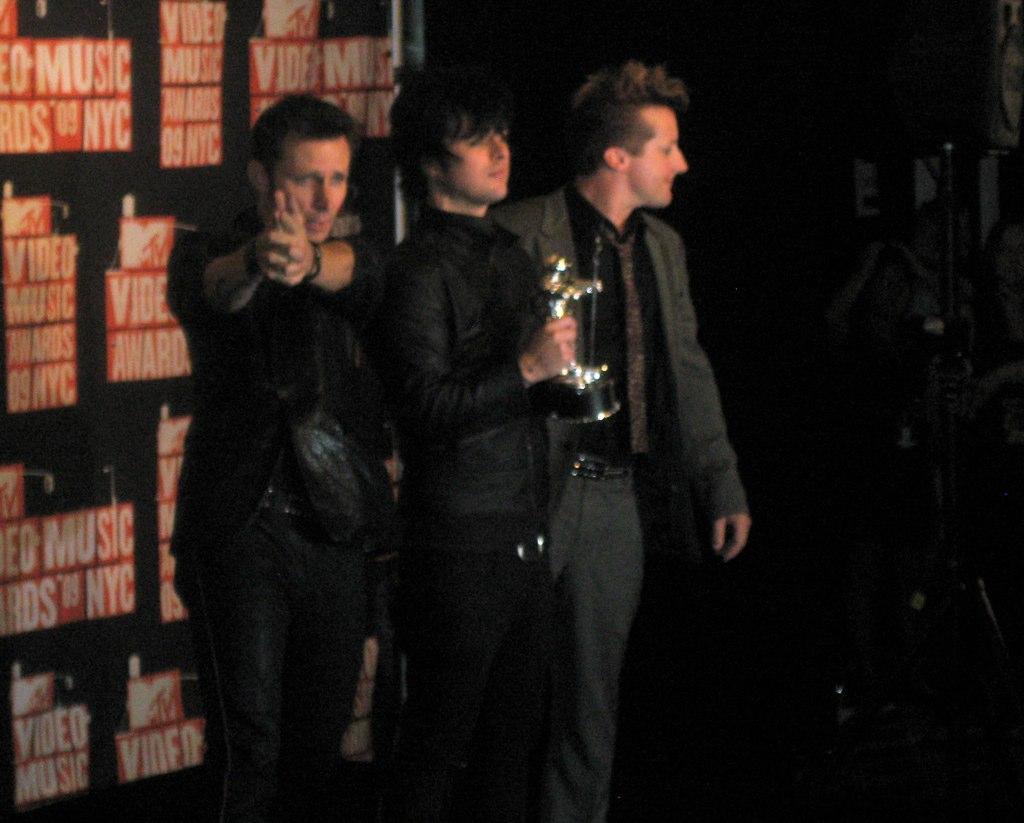
Green Day, a power trio, at 2009 MTV Video Music Awards: From left to right: Bassist Mike Dirnt, singer/guitarist Billie Joe Armstrong, and drummer Tré Cool

A handful of others with the bassist on vocals include Thin Lizzy (from 1970 to 1974), Primus, Rush, Motörhead, the Police, and Cream.

Some power trios feature two lead vocalists. For example, in the band Blink-182, vocals are split between bassist Mark Hoppus and guitarist Tom DeLonge, or in the band Dinosaur Jr., guitarist J. Mascis is the primary songwriter and vocalist, but bassist Lou Barlow writes some songs and sings, as well.

An alternative to the power trio is an organ trios formed with an electric guitarist, a drummer, and a keyboardist. Although organ trios are most commonly associated with 1950s and 1960s jazz organ trio groups such as those led by organist Jimmy Smith, organ trios also exist in rock-oriented styles, such as jazz-rock fusion and Grateful Dead–influenced jam bands, for instance Medeski Martin & Wood. In organ trios, the keyboard player typically plays a Hammond organ or similar instrument, which permits the keyboard player to perform bass lines, chords, and lead lines. A variant of the organ trio is a trio formed with an electric bassist, a drummer, and an electronic keyboardist (playing synthesizers) such as the progressive rock band Emerson, Lake & Palmer.

A power trio with the guitarist on lead vocals is a popular record-company lineup, as the guitarist and singer usually are songwriters. Therefore, the label only has to present one "face" to the public. The backing band may or may not be featured in publicity. If the backup band is not marketed as an integral part of the group, then the record company has more flexibility to replace band members or use substitute musicians. This lineup often leads to songs that are fairly simple and accessible, as the frontman has to sing and play guitar at the same time.

== Four members ==
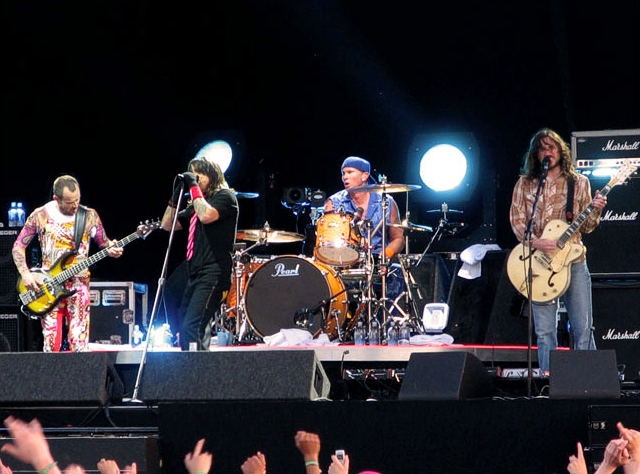
Red Hot Chili Peppers is a four-part band with a lead vocalist, guitarist, bassist, and drummer lineup.

The four-piece band is the most common configuration in rock and pop music. Before the development of the electronic keyboard, the configuration was typically two guitarists, a bassist, and a drummer (e.g. The Beatles, Kiss, Metallica, Golden Earring, the La's, Weezer, the Clash, the Smashing Pumpkins and My Bloody Valentine).

Another common formation is a vocalist, electric guitarist, bass guitarist, and a drummer (e.g. Van Halen, The Who, Red Hot Chili Peppers, Led Zeppelin, and U2). Instrumentally, these bands can be considered as trios.

In some bands, the guitarist could also be an occasional keyboardist, like The Who, the Smiths, and Joy Division. Some bands have a keyboardist instead of a guitarist, like Bastille and Future Islands. In some rock bands, bassists could be occasional keyboardists like Led Zeppelin and R.E.M. Keyboardists are used in place of bass, performing with a guitarist, singer, and drummer, for instance the Doors. Some bands have a guitarist, keyboard player, bassist, and drummer, for example Talking Heads, the Small Faces, and Pink Floyd.

Some bands have the lead vocalists that are also the pianist and keyboardist such as Queen, The Killers and Coldplay. Some bands have the bassist on lead vocals, such as Thin Lizzy (a four-piece from 1974 onwards), Pink Floyd, Motörhead (as a four-piece 1984–1995), NOFX, Skillet, or even the lead guitarist, such as Dire Straits, Megadeth, Weezer, and Creedence Clearwater Revival. Some bands, such as the Beatles, have a lead guitarist, a rhythm guitarist, and a bassist that all sing lead and backing vocals, with those three playing and composing on keyboards regularly, as well as a drummer. Others, such as the Four Seasons, have a lead vocalist, a lead guitarist, a keyboard player, and a bassist, with the drummer not being a member of the band.

== Five members ==
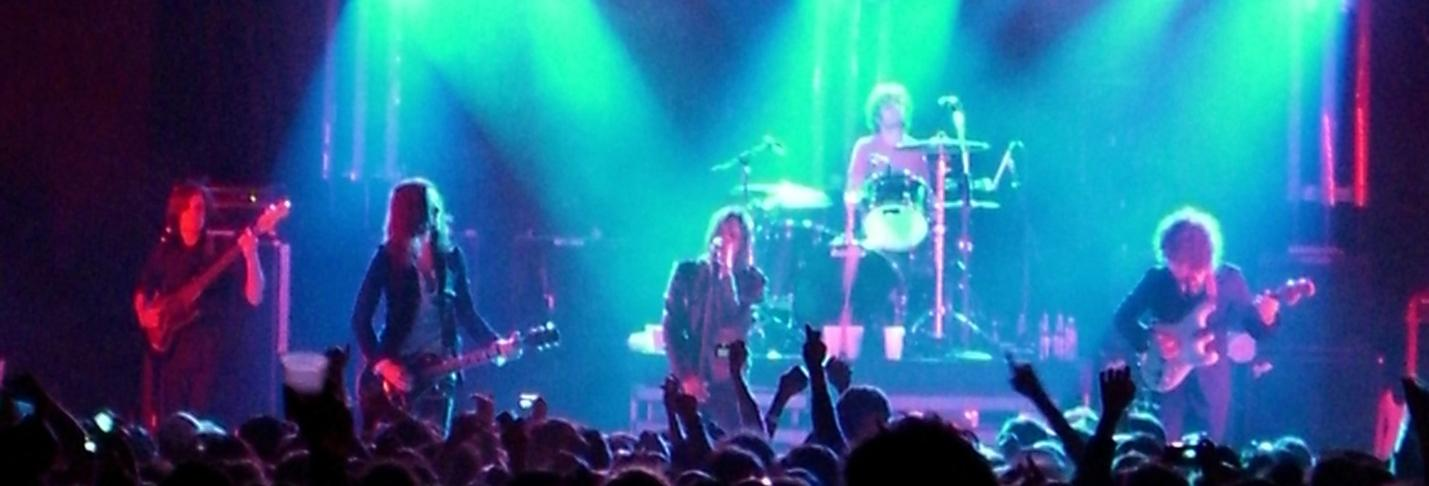
The Strokes are a five-part band with a lead vocalist, two guitarists, bassist, and drummer lineup.

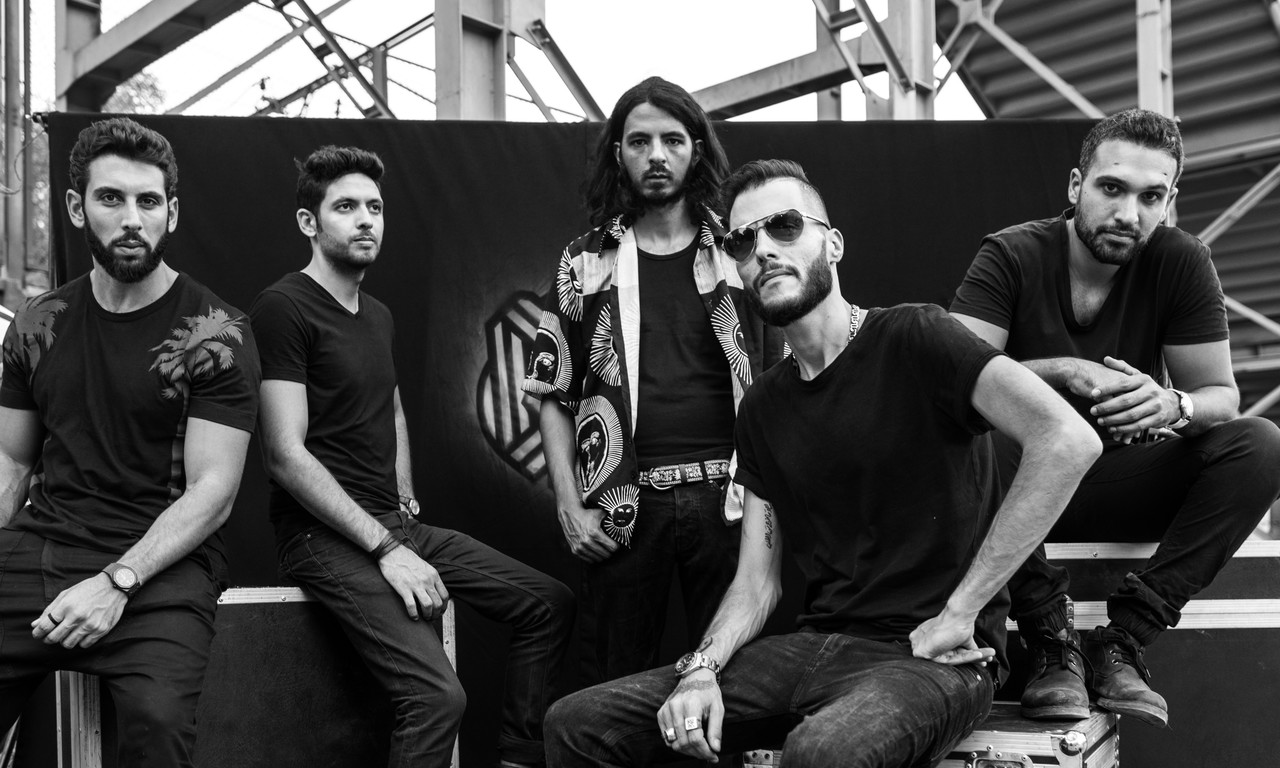
Cairokee are a five-part band with a lead vocalist, two guitarists, bassist, and drummer lineup.

Five-piece bands have existed in rock music since the development of the genre. Aerosmith, AC/DC, Def Leppard and Oasis are examples of the common lineup of vocalist, lead guitar, rhythm guitar, bass, and drums. An alternative lineup replaces the rhythm guitarist with a keyboard–synthesizer player (examples being the bands Yes, Journey, Bon Jovi, Dream Theater, and Deep Purple). Another alternative replaces the rhythm guitarist with a turntablist, such as in Deftones, Incubus, or Limp Bizkit.

Further alternatives include a keyboardist, guitarist, drummer, bassist, and saxophonist, such as the Sonics, the Dave Clark 5, and Sam the Sham and the Pharaohs. Three guitarists may be present with a bassist and a drummer, such as in the bands Radiohead, Pearl Jam, and the Byrds. Some five-person bands feature two guitarists, a keyboardist, a bassist, and a drummer, with one or more of these musicians (typically one of the guitarists) handling lead vocals on top of their instrument (examples being Children of Bodom, Styx, Tally Hall, The Cars and White Reaper). The four-piece arrangement can be augmented to five with a second drummer playing a separate full drumkit, such as Adam and the Ants from 1980 onwards, although other formations can also be expanded using two drummers such as Pink Fairies (1970–1971), the Glitter Band, Wizzard, Sigue Sigue Sputnik, Add N to (X), and Rialto.

Other times, the vocalist brings another musical "voice" to the table, most commonly a harmonica or percussion; Mick Jagger, for example, plays harmonica and percussion instruments such as maracas and tambourine in the Rolling Stones. Ozzy Osbourne played the harmonica on some occasions with Black Sabbath. Flutes may also be used by vocalists, most notably Ian Anderson of Jethro Tull and Ray Thomas of the Moody Blues.

== Larger rock ensembles ==
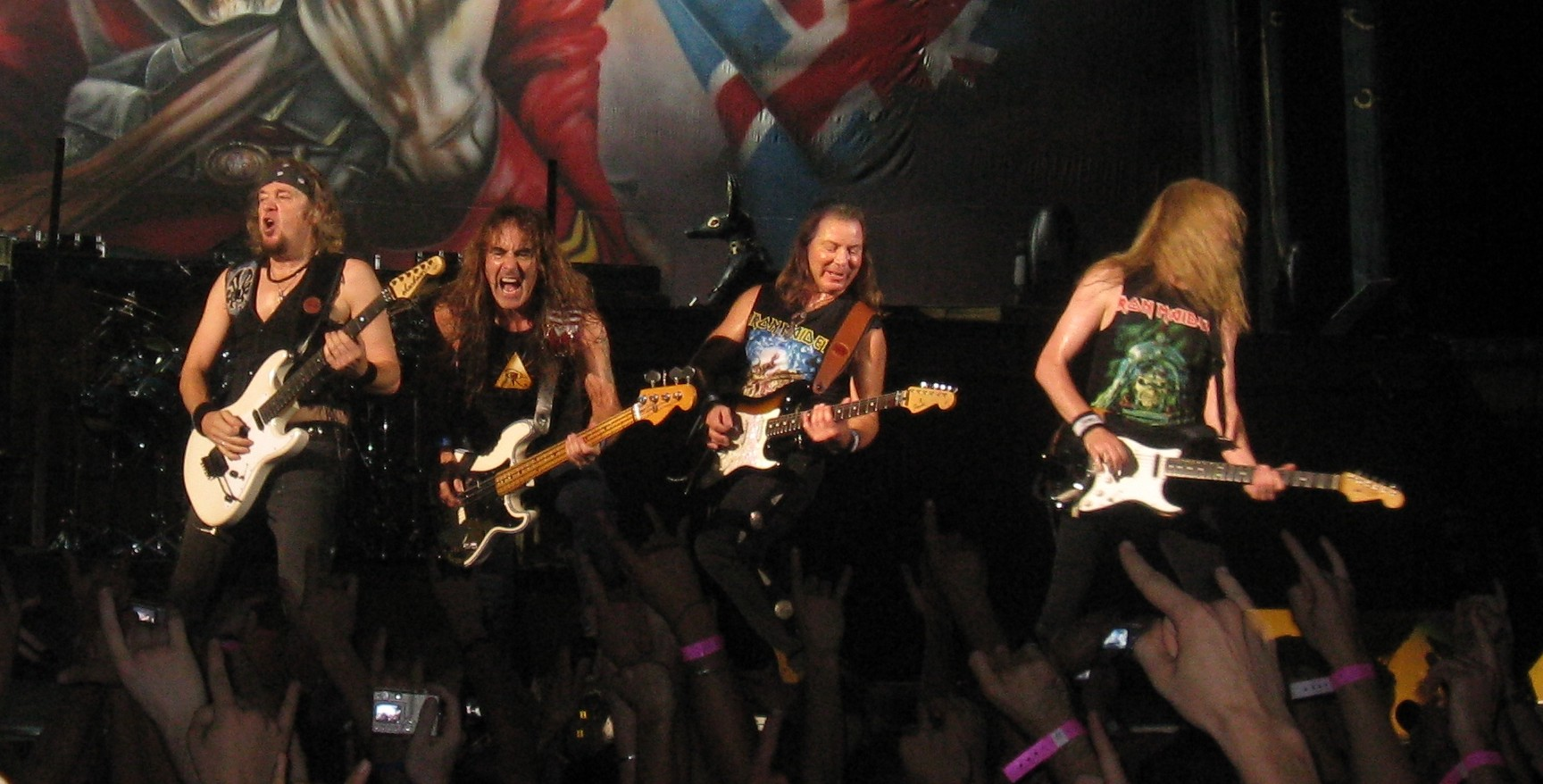
Iron Maiden is a six-part band with a lead vocalist, three guitarists, a bassist, and drummer lineup. (Not shown in this image are Bruce Dickinson and Nicko McBrain.)

Larger bands have long been a part of rock and pop music, in part due to the influence of the "singer accompanied with orchestra" model inherited from popular big-band jazz and swing and popularized by Frank Sinatra and Ella Fitzgerald. To create larger ensembles, rock bands often add an additional guitarist, an additional keyboardist, additional percussionists or second drummer, an entire horn section, and even a flautist. An example of a six-member rock band is Toto with a lead vocalist, guitarist, bassist, two keyboard players, and drummer. Other examples include bands like INXS, OneRepublic and American Blondie; both consist of a lead vocalist, two guitarists, a keyboard player, a bassist, and a drummer. The American heavy-metal band Slipknot is composed of nine members, with a vocalist, two guitarists, a drummer, a bassist, two custom percussionists, a turntablist, and a sampler. Brazilian band Titãs, currently a three-man band, had as many as eight members in the late 1980s, with three lead singers, two guitarists, bassist, keyboard player, and drummer.

In larger groups (such as the Band), instrumentalists could play multiple instruments, which enabled the ensemble to create a wider variety of instrument combinations. More modern examples of such a band are Arcade Fire, Edward Sharpe and the Magnetic Zeros, and King Gizzard & the Lizard Wizard. More rarely, rock or pop groups are accompanied in concerts by a full or partial symphony orchestra, where lush string-orchestra arrangements are used to flesh out the sound of slow ballads. Rhys Chatham and Glenn Branca started doing performances in the late 1970s with orchestras consisting of 10 to 100 (Branca) and even 400 guitars. Some groups have a large number of members who all play the same instrument, such as guitar, keyboard, horns, or strings.

== Role of women ==
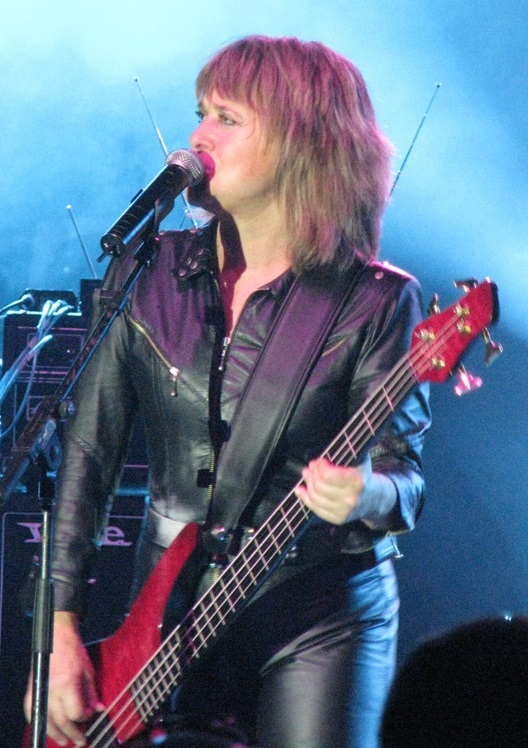
Suzi Quatro is a singer, bassist, and bandleader. When she launched her career in 1973, she was one of the few prominent female instrumentalists and bandleaders.

Women have a high prominence in many popular music styles as singers. However, professional women instrumentalists are uncommon in popular music, especially in rock genres such as heavy metal. "[P]laying in a band is largely a male homosocial activity, that is, learning to play in a band is largely a peer-based... experience, shaped by existing sex-segregated friendship networks." As well, rock music "...is often defined as a form of male rebellion vis-à-vis female bedroom culture." In popular music, a gendered "distinction between public (male) and private (female) participation" in music has existed. "[S]everal scholars have argued that men exclude women from bands or from the bands' rehearsals, recordings, performances, and other social activities." "Women are mainly regarded as passive and private consumers of allegedly slick, prefabricated – hence, inferior – pop music..., excluding them from participating as high-status rock musicians." One of the reasons that mixed-gender bands rarely exist is that "bands operate as tight-knit units in which homosocial solidarity – social bonds between people of the same sex... – plays a crucial role." In the 1960s, pop music scene, "[s]inging was sometimes an acceptable pastime for a girl, but playing an instrument...simply wasn't done."

"The rebellion of rock music was largely a male rebellion; the women—often, in the 1950s and '60s, girls in their teens—in rock usually sang songs as personæ utterly dependent on their macho boyfriends...". Philip Auslander says that "Although there were many women in rock by the late 1960s, most performed only as singers, a traditionally feminine position in popular music". Though some women played instruments in American all-female garage rock bands, none of these bands achieved more than regional success. So they "did not provide viable templates for women's on-going participation in rock". In relation to the gender composition of heavy-metal bands, it has been said that "[h]eavy metal performers are almost exclusively male" "...[a]t least until the mid-1980s" apart from "...exceptions such as Girlschool." However, "...now [in the 2010s] maybe more than ever–strong metal women have put up their dukes and got down to it", "carv[ing] out a considerable place for [them]selves." When Suzi Quatro emerged in 1973, "no other prominent female musician worked in rock simultaneously as a singer, instrumentalist, songwriter, and bandleader". According to Auslander, she was "kicking down the male door in rock and roll and proving that a female musician ... and this is a point I am extremely concerned about ... could play as well if not better than the boys".

== Variable lineups ==
Many bands maintain different but consistent lineups for studio recording vs. live performances. Toxic Holocaust, for instance, consisted entirely of a single member within the recording studio for the first 10 years of their existence but still toured as a band with supplementary members on stage. For decades Genesis maintained two consistent lineups: Tony Banks, Mike Rutherford and Phil Collins in the studio with Chester Thompson and Daryl Stuermer always additionally appearing as band members in live performances.

== See also ==
- Side project, a band containing a person or persons already in another band
