= Palaye Royale =

American rock band

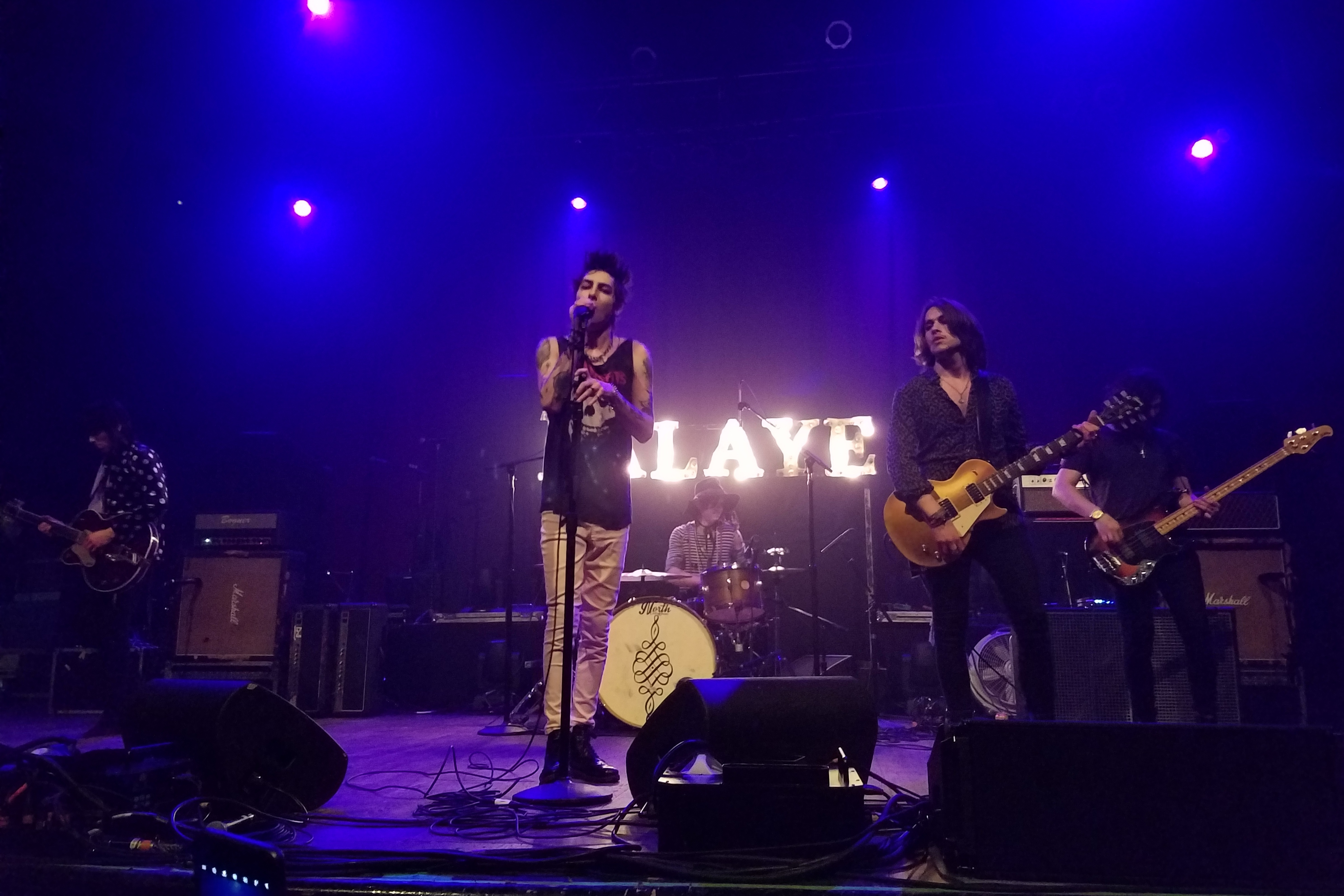
- Palaye Royale performing in 2018

Background information
- Also known as: Kropp Circle (2008–2011)
- Origin: Las Vegas, Nevada, U.S.
- Genres: Art rock; rock and roll; glam rock; garage rock
- Years active: 2008–present
- Label: Sumerian
- Members: Remington Leith; Sebastian Danzig; Emerson Barrett
- Website: palayeroyale.com

Palaye Royale is an American rock band from Las Vegas, formed in 2008 by brothers Remington Leith, Sebastian Danzig, and Emerson Barrett. Formed under the name Kropp Circle, the band released one EP and two singles before changing their name to Palaye Royale in 2011. Under this name, they have released five full-length albums and four EPs through Sumerian Records.

== History ==
=== 2008–2010: Kropp Circle and early years ===
The band's principal members are brothers Sebastian Danzig, Remington Leith and Emerson Barrett. When Danzig was sixteen, Leith was fourteen and Barrett was twelve, their mother, Stephanie Cowper, was advised by her friend Paul Weller of the Jam to allow the brothers to drop out of school and pursue music as a career. The brothers originally formed under the name Kropp Circle and began playing a style of acoustic soft rock. The band was featured in the online Radio Disney show N.B.T. (Next Big Thing) in 2009. The following year they released the four track EP Who we Really are, accompanied by two singles and music videos: "Who we Really are" and "Can't Stop the Rain".

=== 2011–2019: Name change and Boom Boom Room (Side A and B) ===
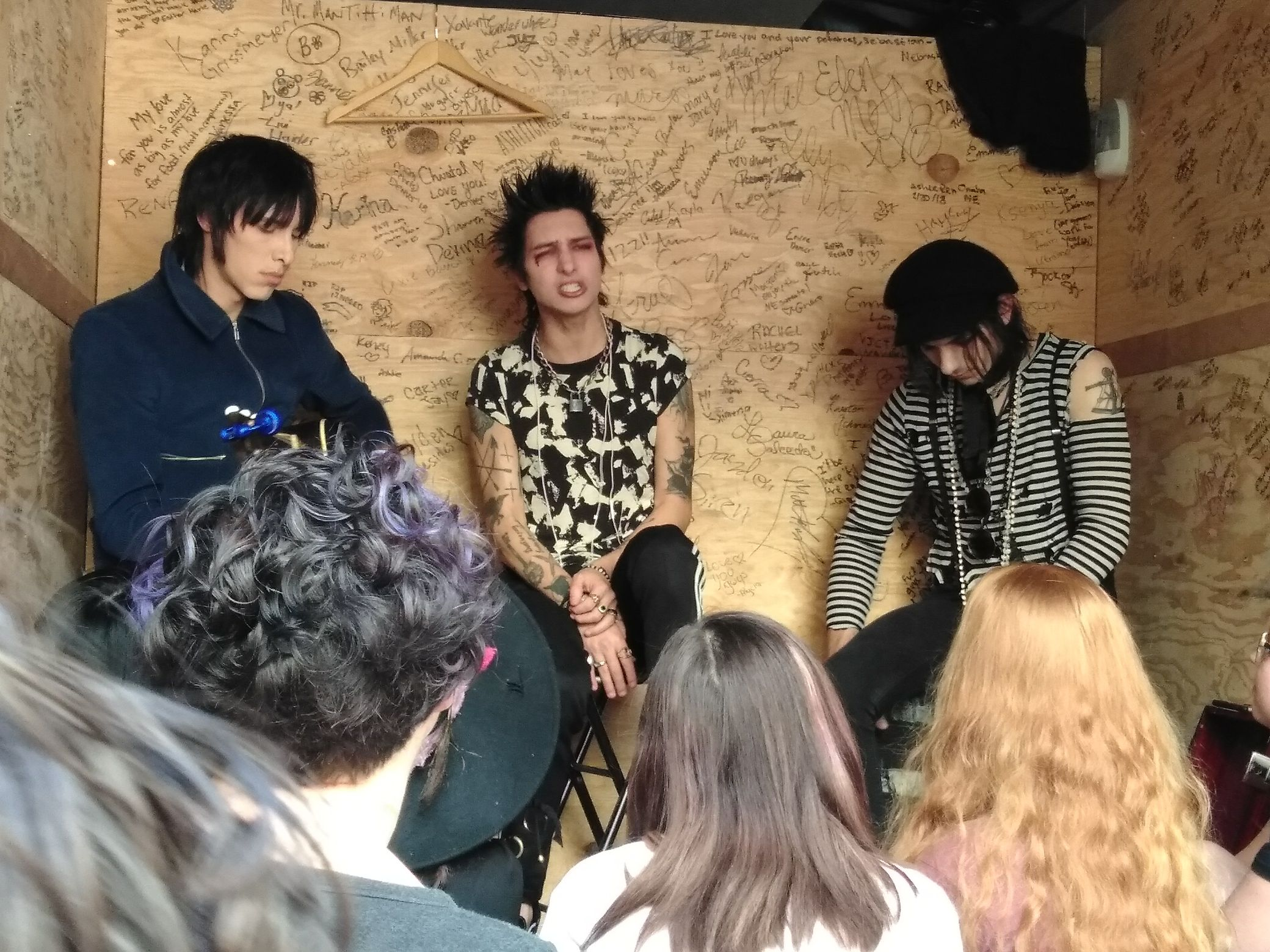
Palaye Royale performing an acoustic set in 2018

In 2011, Kropp Circle changed their name to Palaye Royale, as a reference to the dance hall Palais Royale in Toronto, where their grandparents first met. Palaye Royale released their first single "Morning Light" in March 2012. The six-song EP The Ends Beginning was released in June 2013. In 2014 they were the first unsigned band to win MTV's Musical March Madness tournament, beating out artists such as Linkin Park. In late 2015 they signed with Sumerian Records, and released their first full-length album Boom Boom Room (Side A) in June 2016. The single "Get Higher" peaked at #26 on the Billboard Modern Rock Charts. They travelled with the Warped Tour in 2016. In 2017 Remington Leith provided the singing voice for the character Johnny Faust (otherwise played by Andy Biersack) in the film American Satan; Leith also voiced the singer in the film's fictional band “The Relentless”. During this period, the band added bassist Daniel Curcio and guitarist Andrew Martin as touring musicians.

Palaye Royale began recording their second album in early 2018, though material from early sessions was scrapped. The album Boom Boom Room (Side B) was completed just one week before the band joined that year's Warped Tour. The album was released in September 2018. During this period, the band's British fans organized a series of meet-ups in public parks called Palaye in the Park; the band attended this first one in London, and fans in other countries have adopted the practice. The band organized their tour in the spring 2019 to support Boom Boom Room (Side B); during the time, Sebastian Danzig was arrested for throwing a cup of coffee at a car that tried to run over him and his fiancée's dog. In the summer of that year, Palaye Royale opened for Rob Zombie and Marilyn Manson on the Twins of Evil Tour. In early 2020, the band instituted a series of "pop-up shops" in England, in which that country's fans could attend a special retail event to purchase band merchandise without paying international shipping costs; artwork by drummer Emerson Barrett is often featured at these events. The events spread to other European countries, with the band appearing at some.

=== 2020–2023: The Bastards and Fever Dream ===
The band embarked on a European tour in early 2020 to support their upcoming third album. A February date in Glasgow, Scotland was cancelled due to a disagreement with the venue, and another show in Birmingham, England was cancelled but replaced by a sold-out show in Wolverhampton. Just before a show in Prague, Czech Republic, the rest of the tour was canceled due to the COVID-19 pandemic. The band's third album, The Bastards, was released in May 2020 and included songwriting contributions from touring musicians Daniel Curcio and Andrew Martin. Curcio was fired from the band in June 2020 due to allegations of online misconduct.

On July 5, 2021, the band announced the beginning of a new album era and the upcoming release of two new singles. On July 9 both singles, titled "No Love In LA" and "Punching Bag", were released on all platforms. On October 11, 2021, the band released a new single titled "Paranoid". The title of the album Fever Dream was officially announced on November 16 during an interview with Ted Stryker, also officially announced by the band with a post on the band's official Twitter account. On May 20, they released the single "Broken", followed by the album's titular track "Fever Dream" on July 15. On August 3, they announced their 2023 Fever Dream European and UK tour, with special guests Yonaka. On June 23, 2023, they released the single "Debilitate" featuring Pussy Riot, which had previously been included as a bonus track from the Japanese edition of Fever Dream. On November 22, they released a cover of the Smashing Pumpkins's 1995 song "Bullet with Butterfly Wings" as a single, a part of the soundtrack for the science fiction film Divinity.

=== 2023–present: Sextape, Songs for Sadness and Death or Glory ===
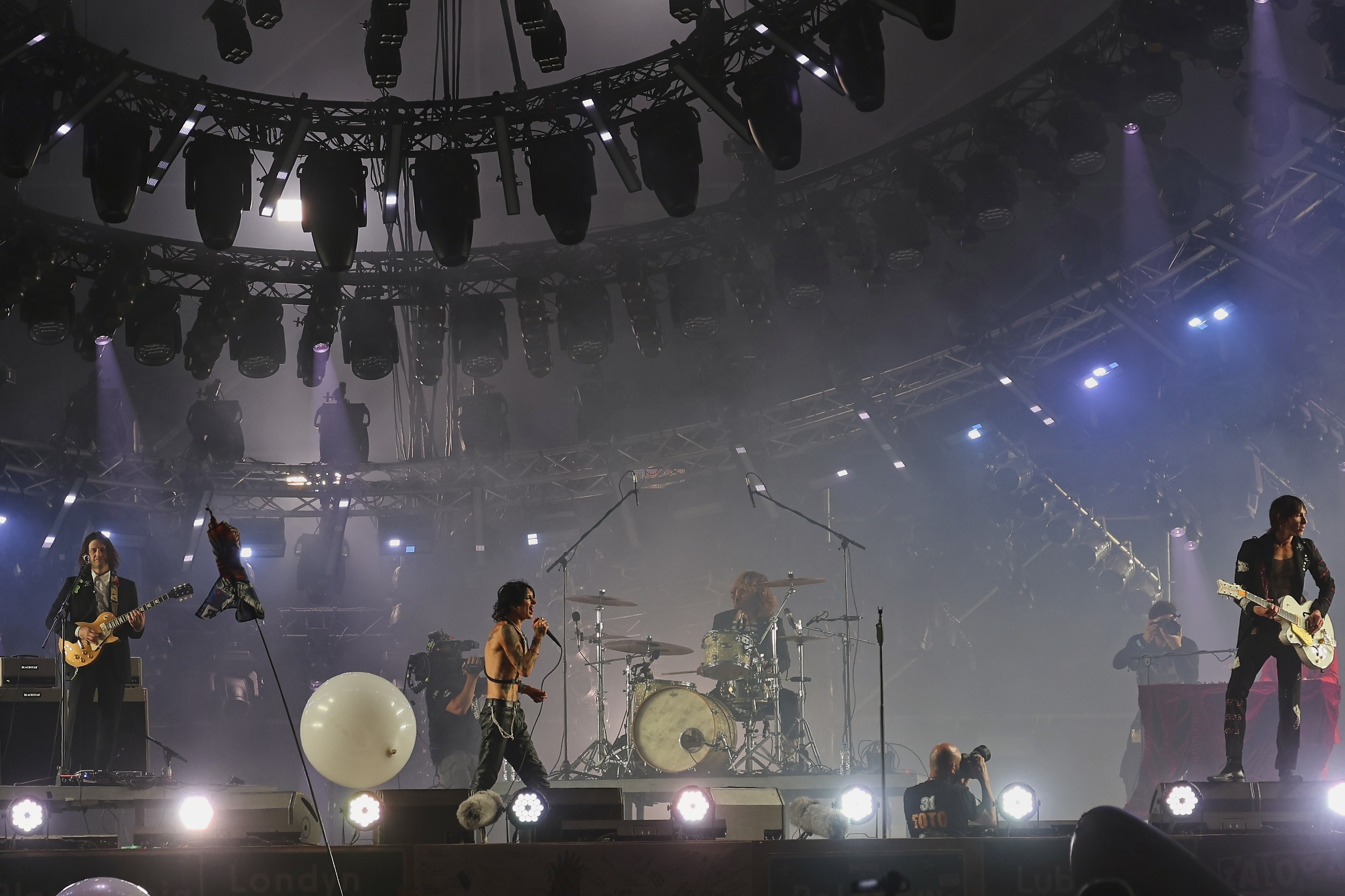
At the Pol'and'Rock Festival in 2025

On December 1, 2023, the band released the single "Dead To Me" and announced that it would be a part of their EP Sextape, set for release on December 8.

On January 12, 2024, Palaye Royale released the single "umakemenotwannadie", which was accompanied by the announcement it would be a part of the Songs For Sadness EP, released on January 19, 2024.

On May 7, 2024, they released the single, "Just My Type", which was followed by "Wednesday Afternoon" on May 12. On June 5, they released the three track single "Dead To Me (Reimagined)", which featured the original "Dead to Me" song, along with an acoustic version and a reimagined version featuring Unlike Pluto and Joanna Jones. On June 26, they released the single "Showbiz", accompanied by the announcement that their fifth studio album Death or Glory would be released on August 30 of the same year.

On October 1, 2026, they announced their sixth album would be titled Amsterdamage and that its release is set for 2027.

== Musical style ==
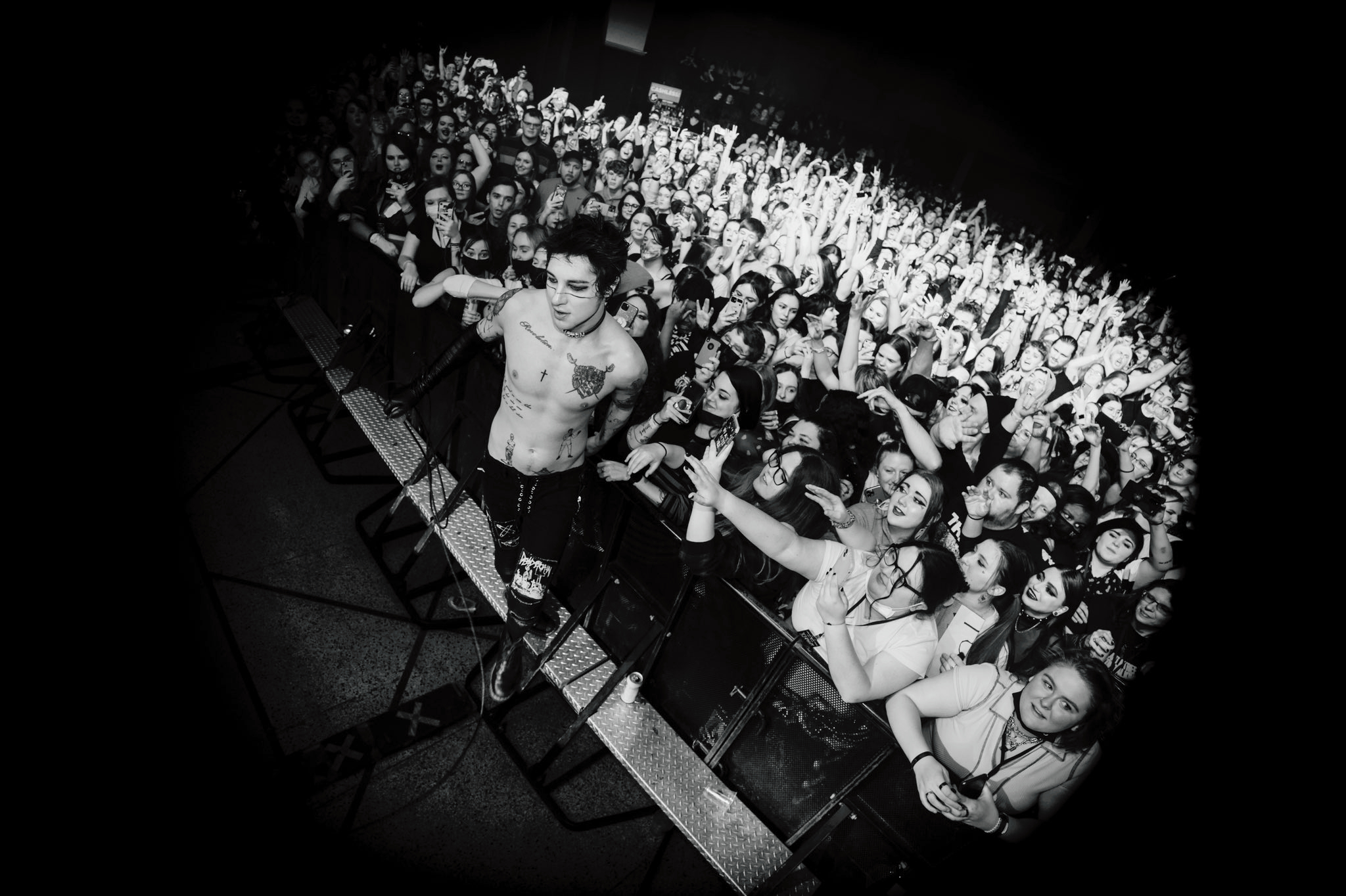
Vocalist Remington Leith during a 2022 live performance

The band's music is a throwback style of rock music, referencing the styles of the 1960s and 1970s. Critics have categorised their music as art rock, rock and roll, glam rock, and garage rock. They call themselves a "fashion-art rock" band.

They have cited influences such as the Animals, the Faces, Small Faces, the Rolling Stones, the Doors, David Bowie, T. Rex, the Velvet Underground, classical music, the New York Dolls, My Chemical Romance, Led Zeppelin, the Who, the Sex Pistols, the Libertines, the Strokes, Mott the Hoople, the Blue Stones, King Princess, and Them Crooked Vultures. Classic Rock Magazine described their style as "crash[ing] from My Chemical Romance-influenced rock to New York Dolls-ish punk via dashes of Stones-y blues".

== Band members ==
- Remington Leith – lead vocals (2008–present)
- Sebastian Danzig – lead guitar, keyboards (2008–present)
- Emerson Barrett – drums, piano (2008–present)

Current touring members

- Logan Baudean – bass, drums (2022–present)
- Dave Green – rhythm guitar (2023–present)

Past touring members

- Daniel Curcio – bass (2017–2020)
- Andrew Martin – rhythm guitar (2018–2023)
- Jennie Vee – bass (2021–2022)

== Discography ==
=== Studio albums ===
- Boom Boom Room (Side A) (2016)
- Boom Boom Room (Side B) (2018)
- The Bastards (2020)
- Fever Dream (2022)
- Death or Glory (2024)
- Amsterdamage (2027)

=== EPs ===
- Who We Really Are (2010)
- The End's Beginning (2013)
- Sextape (2023)
- Songs for Sadness (2024)

=== Singles ===
List of singles, with selected chart positions and certifications
Title	Year	Peak chart positions				Album
Title	Year	US Alt.	US Main.	US Rock/Alt. Air.	CAN Rock	Album
"Who We Really Are" (as Kropp Circle)	2010	—	—	—	—	Who We Really Are
"Can't Stop the Rain" (as Kropp Circle)	2010	—	—	—	—	Who We Really Are
"Morning Light"	2012	—	—	—	—	Non-album single
"Get Higher"	2013	—	26	—	—	Boom Boom Room (Side A)
"White"	2013	—	—	—	—	Boom Boom Room (Side A)
"You'll Be Fine"	2018	—	22	—	37	Boom Boom Room (Side B)
"Death Dance"	2018	—	—	—	—	Boom Boom Room (Side B)
"Fucking with My Head"	2019	—	—	—	—	The Bastards
"Nervous Breakdown"	2019	—	—	—	—	The Bastards
"Hang On to Yourself"	2019	—	39	—	—	The Bastards
"Massacre, the New American Dream"	2019	—	—	—	—	The Bastards
"Lonely"	2020	—	—	—	—	The Bastards
"Little Bastards"	2020	—	—	—	—	The Bastards
"Anxiety"	2020	—	—	—	—	The Bastards
"Mad World" (Tears for Fears cover)	2020	—	—	—	—	Non-album single
"Nightmares in Paradise"	2021	—	—	—	—	Paradise City Season One Soundtrack
"No Love in LA"	2021	34	—	—	—	Fever Dream
"Punching Bag"	2021	—	—	—	—	Fever Dream
"Paranoid"	2021	—	—	—	—	Fever Dream
"Broken"	2022	31	—	47	—	Fever Dream
"Fever Dream"	2022	—	—	—	—	Fever Dream
"Lifeless Stars"	2022	36	—	—	—	Fever Dream
"Destrozado y Roto" (Spanish language version of "Broken")	2022	—	—	—	—	Fever Dream
"Debilitate" (feat. Pussy Riot)	2023	—	—	—	—	Fever Dream
"Bullet with Butterfly Wings" (The Smashing Pumpkins cover)	2023	—	—	—	—	Divinity Soundtrack: Music Inspired by the Motion Picture
"Dead to Me"	2023	—	20	—	—	Sextape
"umakemenotwannadie"	2024	—	—	—	—	Songs for Sadness
"Just My Type"	2024	—	—	—	—	Death or Glory
"Wednesday Afternoon"	2024	—	—	—	—	Non-album single
"Dead to Me (Reimagined)" (featuring Unlike Pluto and Joanna Jones)	2024	—	—	—	—	Non-album single
"Showbiz"	2024	30	—	—	—	Death or Glory
"Ache in My Heart"	2024	—	—	—	—	Death or Glory
"Dark Side of the Silver Spoon"	2024	—	—	—	—	Death or Glory
"Addicted to the Wicked & Twisted"	2025	—	31	—	—	Death or Glory
"Feel Something, Great"	2025	—	—	—	—	Non-album singles
"Sad Generation"	2025	—	—	—	—	Non-album singles
"Lost In Translation"	2026	—	—	—	—	Amsterdamage
"—" denotes a release that did not chart or was not issued in that region.

=== Other appearances ===
Title	Year	Band	Album
"Bullet with Butterfly Wings"	2026	The Smashing Pumpkins	Sending Hearts to All My Dearies: A Tribute to the Smashing Pumpkins

=== Music videos ===
==== As Kropp Circle ====
Year	Title(s)
2009	"Who We Really Are"
2009	"Invisible"
2009	"Can't Stop the Rain"
2009	"Still with Me"
2009	"Fade Away"

==== As Palaye Royale ====
Year	Title(s)	Director(s)	Album
2012	"Morning Light"	Harrison Sanborn	Non-album single
2013	"Get Higher"	Harrison Sanborn	Boom Boom Room (Side A)
2015	"Don't Feel Quite Right"	Unknown	Boom Boom Room (Side A)
2016	"Mr. Doctor Man"	Ash Avildsen	Boom Boom Room (Side A)
2018	"My Youth Generation"	Unknown	Boom Boom Room (Side A)
2018	"You'll Be Fine"	Frankie Nasso	Boom Boom Room (Side B)
2018	"Death Dance"	Mount Emult	Boom Boom Room (Side B)
2019	"Dying in a Hot Tub"	Dan Shapiro	Boom Boom Room (Side B)
2019	"Hospital Beds"	Ansley Wiederholt	Boom Boom Room (Side B)
2019	"Fucking with My Head"	Jude Aotik & Bryce Wandling	The Bastards
2019	"Nervous Breakdown"	Unknown	The Bastards
2019	"Hang On to Yourself"	Harrison Sanborn	The Bastards
2019	"Massacre, the New American Dream"	Emerson Barrett	The Bastards
2020	"Lonely"	Unknown	The Bastards
2020	"Little Bastards"	Marco Favone	The Bastards
2020	"Anxiety"	Remington Leith & Michael Bolten	The Bastards
2020	"Mad World"	Santiago Pagnotta	Non-album single
2020	"Tonight Is the Night I Die"	Padraig Reynolds	The Bastards
2020	"Black Sheep"	Padraig Reynolds	The Bastards
2021	"Punching Bag"	Matthew Force & Padraig Reynolds	Fever Dream
2021	"No Love in LA"	Matthew Force & Padraig Reynolds	Fever Dream
2021	"Paranoid"	Harrison Sanborn	Fever Dream
2022	"Broken"	Eva Vik	Fever Dream
2022	"Fever Dream"	Gianluigi Carella	Fever Dream
2022	"Line It Up"	Ivy Tellin	Fever Dream
2022	"Oblivion"	Eva Vik	Fever Dream
2022	"Eleanor Rigby"	Tony Celano	Non-album single
2023	"Debilitate"	Unknown	Fever Dream
2023	"Dead to Me"	Unknown	Sextape
2023	"Closer"	Yulia Shur	Sextape
2024	"umakemenotwannadie"	Unknown	Songs for Sadness
2024	"Just My Type"	Mod Sun	Death or Glory
2024	"Showbiz"	Tanner James Gordon	Death or Glory
2024	"Ache in My Heart"	Gianennio Salucci	Death or Glory
2024	"Dark Side of the Silver Spoon"	Gianennio Salucci	Death or Glory
2024	"Cyanide"	Juan Flores Mena	Non-album singles
2025	"Pray to Me"	Nas Bogado	Non-album singles
2025	"Feel Something, Great"	Unknown	Non-album singles
2025	"Sad Generation"	Unknown	Non-album singles

== Awards and nominations ==
Year	Award	Category	Result	Ref.
2017	Alternative Press Music Awards	Best Underground Band	Nominated	
2018	Rock Sound Awards	Best Breakthrough Artist	Won	
2020	The Juno Awards	Breakthrough Group of the Year	Nominated	
