= Sistrionix =

Studio album by Deap Vally
- Released: June 24, 2013
- Genre: Garage rock, blues rock
- Length: 41:11
- Label: Island
- Producer: Lars Stalfors

Deap Vally chronology
Sistrionix (2013)	Femejism (2016)

Singles from Sistrionix
- 1. "End of the World" Released: November 15, 2012; 2. "Lies" Released: January 7, 2013

Professional ratings
Aggregate scores
Source	Rating
Metacritic	72/100
Review scores
Source	Rating
AllMusic	3.5/5 stars
Consequence of Sound	3/5 stars
LiverpoolSoundAndVision	3.5/5 stars
This Is Fake DIY	8/10

Sistrionix is the debut studio album from American rock duo Deap Vally. Recorded in their Los Angeles hometown, the album was produced by Lars Stalfors, it was released on June 24, 2013 by Island Records, reaching No.38 on the UK charts. The album's cover was painted by the late Australian painter Matt Doust. The album received a nomination on the World Music Award for World's Best Album.

In 2024, the band released Sistrionix 2.0, which is a re-recording of this album.

== Track listing ==
No.	Title	Length
1.	"End of the World"	4:34
2.	"Baby I Call Hell"	3:00
3.	"Walk of Shame"	1:52
4.	"Gonna Make My Own Money"	2:33
5.	"Creeplife"	2:23
6.	"Your Love"	3:32
7.	"Lies"	3:06
8.	"Bad for My Body"	3:04
9.	"Woman of Intention"	3:41
10.	"Raw Material"	3:52
11.	"Six Feet Under"	9:34

iTunes Deluxe Version
No.	Title	Length
12.	"Drought"	3:40
13.	"Procreate"	2:16
14.	"Ain't Fair"	2:56
