= The Frst =

American indie rock musical project

- Origin: Nashville, Tennessee
- Genre: indie rock
- Years active: 2017-present
- Members: Mikei Gray
- Past members: Andrew Leahey, Nathan Cogan, Jesse Hughes & Jennie Vee of Eagles of Death Metal, Craig Owens of Chiodos, Obie Trice, Bizarre of D12, The Dangerous Summer (band), Kellin Quinn & Matty Best of Sleeping With Sirens, Jaret Reddick of Bowling For Soup, Aaron Gillespie of The Almost
- Website: www.thefrst.com

The Frst (pronounced “first”) is an American indie rock musical project founded by singer and guitarist Mikei Gray in Nashville, Tennessee.

in 2017. The project's contributors consist of Gray and a rotating lineup of guest musicians, which has included Kellin Quinn & Matty Best of Sleeping With Sirens, Jaret Reddick of Bowling For Soup, Aaron Gillespie of The Almost, Andrew Leahey, and Taking Back Sunday’s touring musician Nathan Cogan amongst others.

Their best known song is “Bruce Lee” which reached #29 on the iTunes Top 100 Rock Chart. followed by “Tarantino” which reached #78 on the same chart and #1 at KXFM. They had two other songs on SoundCloud USA Rock charts: "Ammo” which reached #1 and “Seven Eleven” which reached #2.

== History ==
Before forming The Frst, Gray had toured as an opening act for artists such as Sublime with Rome, Village People, Florida Georgia Line, and Portugal. The Man, playing in venues such as the Vans Warped Tour and the Grand Ole Opry. Gray founded The Frst in 2017, changing the spelling of the project's name to reflect its collaborative nature and changing lineup.

The Frst released its debut single, “Another One” in 2018.

In 2019, the project also released several singles, including “Cycles,” “Seven Eleven,” “Rules,” and “Ammo.” “Seven Eleven” reached #2 on the SoundCloud USA Rock chart and was also featured on Loudwire’s Weekly Wire. "Ammo” reached #1 on the SoundCloud USA Rock chart.

The Frst also released the singles “Pawn Shop,” “Simulation,” and “Tarantino” in 2020. “Tarantino” reached #78 on the iTunes Top 100 Rock Chart and #1 at KXFM. “Simulation” was released alongside the augmented reality phone app called “The Frst,” which allowed users to scan The Frst's logo for behind-the-scenes content.

In August 2020, The Frst released its debut album, Prelude. Gray wrote and performed seven of the ten songs on Prelude by himself. The Frst also released the single “Duh'' concurrently with the album, which reached #3 on the SoundCloud USA Rock Chart.

After the release of Prelude, The Frst released the single “This Is Me Now” in 2021, which featured Universal-Island artist Kid Brunswick. and charted at #46 on the iTunes Rock Chart in the Philippines. It was the second collaboration between Gray and Brunswick, the first being on Brunswick's song “Bipolar Rhapsody.”

In summer of the same year, The Frst also released the single “Small Talk.” Gray played on more than 130 instrumental and vocal tracks within the song.

The Frst has worked with mixing and mastering engineers such as Steve Hardy, James Paul Wisner, and Andy VanDette.

In January 2022, The Frst released a single with InVogue Records artist Dead Bundy, called “Pop Punk Song.”

On July 23, 2022, The Frst released a new single called Geronimo. The track features Just a Ride & Solcura.

In 2023 The Frst released several singles including “Bruce Lee,” featuring Kellin Quinn and Sleeping With Sirens, which debuted on BBC Radio1 and hit #29 on the iTunes Rock Chart, and “Murderabilia,” featuring Eagles of Death Metal, aiming to raise awareness about the meaning of Murderabilia, while simultaneously receiving favorable reviews from EarMilk.

On Friday, October 13, 2023, The Frst released “You’re On Your Own, Kid” a Taylor Swift cover, and featured Kellin Quinn & Matty Best of Sleeping With Sirens accompanying Gray on vocals and drums respectively.

Starting February 2024, The Frst released several songs including “Torpedo (feat. The Dangerous Summer)”, “Almost There” with Jaret Reddick of Bowling For Soup, “Medicated Kisses,” a rap-rock collaboration featuring Obie Trice and Bizarre of D12, and “Love In 3D,” featuring Craig Owens of Chiodos, Aaron Gillespie of The Almost and Underoath, and Kellin Quinn.“Love in 3D” was released in November, with EarMilk stating, " ‘Love In 3D’ feels like a joyful message from the exciting days of the Vans Warped Tour, placed into a beautiful dreamland inspired by anime.”

The Frst has worked with mixing and mastering engineers such as Steve Hardy, James Paul Wisner, Andy VanDette, Zach Odom & Kenneth Mount, George Perks, and Sam Moses.
