= The Bastards (album) =

Studio album by Palaye Royale
- Released: May 29, 2020
- Length: 46:03
- Label: Sumerian

Palaye Royale chronology
Boom Boom Room (Side B) (2018)	The Bastards (2020)	Fever Dream (2022)

The Bastards is the third studio album by Canadian-American rock band Palaye Royale, released May 29, 2020 by Sumerian Records. It reached no. 12 on the Billboard Top Alternative Albums Chart and no. 27 on the Billboard Top Rock Albums Chart.

== Background ==
The Bastards was recorded in several different locations, including studios in London, England and Joshua Tree, California. Five songs were released as singles with videos before the album was completed: "Lonely", "Massacre, The New American Dream", "Hang on to Yourself", "Fucking with My Head", and "Nervous Breakdown".

The Bastards is a concept album about a formerly expressive society that has been subdued by toxic politics. The songs are divided into four acts describing different eras in the hypothetical society's history. Lyrical topics include mental health, drug addiction, and gun violence. The album's lyrics are more socially-oriented than on the band's previous albums, and proceeds from the single "Massacre, The New American Dream" were donated to gun violence advocacy charities. Guitarist Sebastian Danzig explained that the opening track "Little Bastards" sets up the lyrics of the rest of the album: "The vulnerability, the truth and the aggression all wrapped together in a three and a half minute track which will set the listener up for what is to come for the next 14 tracks and what corners we will touch."

The album is connected to a graphic novel called The Bastards Vol. 1, which was released in December 2020, with art by drummer Emerson Barrett. Videos from the album were based on imagery from a previous graphic novel by Barrett called Neutopian.

== Critical reception ==
The Bastards has received generally positive reviews from the rock press. According to Kerrang!, the album shows that Palaye Royale "have successfully carved out their own niche of glitzy yet gritty rock'n'roll that dares you to deny them," but also noted that some songs with string sections and other enhancements sound "overwrought". New Noise describes the album as "Heavy, yes, but also tender, expressive, painful, and lovely all rolled into a bombastic presentation of emotion and musical perfection." Wall of Sound praised the album for combining "emo pop sensibilities with a rock-and-roll essence that is rare in today’s musical landscape."

Classic Rock magazine noted a lack of subtlety on the album, while it "creaks beneath the huge weight of expectation and its own loud and lavish, hard-edged pop production values" but still concluded that the album represents "a spectacular evolution" in the band's sound. Dead Press criticized a few songs for being uneven but concluded that the album "sees Palaye Royale take another step towards the perfect blend of experimentalism and commercialism." Distorted Sound described the album favorably as "a modern twist of indie-pop/pop-rock that for the first time unearths the band's bold political takes with intrinsically punk values weaved throughout."

== Track listing ==
The Bastards track listing
No.	Title	Writer(s)	Length
1.	"Little Bastards"	Andrew Martin, Daniel Curcio, Emerson Barrett, Matthew Pauling, Remington Leith, Sebastian Danzig	3:38
2.	"Massacre, the New American Dream"	Daniel Curcio, Emerson Barrett, Matthew Pauling, Remington Leith, Sebastian Danzig	3:06
3.	"Anxiety"	Daniel Curcio, Emerson Barrett, Matthew Pauling, Remington Leith, Sebastian Danzig	3:14
4.	"Tonight Is the Night I Die"	Emerson Barrett, Daniel Curcio, Sebastian Danzig, Remington Leith, Matt Pauling	2:52
5.	"Lonely"	Emerson Barrett, Matthew Pauling, Remington Leith, Sebastian Danzig	3:06
6.	"Hang On to Yourself"	Adam Slack, Emerson Barrett, Josh Wilkinson, Luke Spiller, Matthew Pauling, Remington Leigh, Sebastian Danzig	2:37
7.	"Fucking with My Head"	Daniel Curcio, Emerson Barrett, Remington Leith, Sebastian Danzig	2:44
8.	"Nervous Breakdown"	Emerson Barrett, Remington Leith, Sebastian Danzig	3:21
9.	"Nightmares"	Andrew Martin, Daniel Curcio, Emerson Barrett, Matthew Pauling, Remington Leith, Sebastian Danzig	3:38
10.	"Masochist"	Daniel Curcio, Emerson Barrett, Remington Leith, Sebastian Danzig	3:37
11.	"Doom (Empty)"	Andrew Martin, Daniel Curcio, Emerson Barrett, Remington Leith, Sebastian Danzig	2:06
12.	"Black Sheep"	Andrew Martin, Christopher Dean Greatti, Emerson Barrett, Remington Leith, Sebastian Danzig	3:35
13.	"Stay"	Daniel Curcio, Emerson Barrett, Matthew Pauling, Remington Leith, Sebastian Danzig	3:42
14.	"Redeemer"	Emerson Barrett, Matthew Pauling, Remington Leith, Sebastian Danzig	3:20
15.	"Lord of Lies"	Daniel Curcio, Emerson Barrett, Matthew Pauling, Remington Leith, Sebastian Danzig	1:33
Total length:			46:03

Note: "Lord of Lies" is a bonus track on some editions of the album.

== Personnel ==
- Remington Leith – lead vocals
- Sebastian Danzig – guitar, keyboards
- Emerson Barrett – drums, piano

== Charts ==
Chart performance for The Bastards
Chart (2020)	Peak position
Hungarian Albums (MAHASZ)	30
US Billboard 200	192
US Independent Albums (Billboard)	24
US Top Alternative Albums (Billboard)	12
US Top Rock Albums (Billboard)	27
