= Boom Boom Room (Side B) =

Studio album by Palaye Royale
- Released: September 28, 2018
- Venue: North Dwarf Records
- Studio: Original Mind Studios
- Genres: Art rock; garage rock; glam rock
- Length: 26:42
- Label: Sumerian
- Producer: Kevin Dotson

Palaye Royale chronology
Boom Boom Room (Side A) (2016)	Boom Boom Room (Side B) (2018)	The Bastards (2020)

Singles from Boom Boom Room (Side B)
- 1. "You'll Be Fine" Released: July 19, 2018; 2. "Death Dance" Released: August 6, 2018

Professional ratings
Review scores
Source	Rating
AllMusic	Positive
Dead Press!	6/10 stars
Distorted Sound	3/10
Gigsoup	79/100
Louder Than War	8.5/10
Punktastic	Mixed
Vulture Hound	4.75/5

Boom Boom Room (Side B) is the second studio album by American band Palaye Royale. The album was released on September 28, 2018, through the record label Sumerian Records.

== Track listing ==
All lyrics are written by Emerson Barrett, Sebastian Danzig, Remington Leith, Linus, and Matt Pauling except where noted; all music is composed by Palaye Royale

No.	Title	Lyrics	Length
1.	"Death Dance"		3:05
2.	"Teenage Heartbreak Queen"		3:15
3.	"You'll Be Fine"		3:33
4.	"Dying in a Hot Tub"	Daniel Curcio; Kevin Dotson; Matt Pauling; Emerson Barrett; Sebastian Danzig; Remington Leith	3:49
5.	"Mrs. Infamous (My Sweetness)"		3:18
6.	"Hospital Beds"		3:30
7.	"Love the Void"		3:46
8.	"The Boom"		2:25
Total length:			26:42

== Charts ==
Chart (2018)	Peak position
US Billboard 200	89
US Heatseekers Albums (Billboard)	21
US Independent Albums (Billboard)	2
US Top Album Sales (Billboard)	17
US Top Alternative Albums (Billboard)	7
US Top Rock Albums (Billboard)	12
