= Femejism =

Studio album by Deap Vally
- Released: September 16, 2016
- Genres: Garage rock, alternative rock
- Length: 49:37
- Label: Nevado Music
- Producers: Nick Zinner, Deap Vally

Deap Vally chronology
Sistrionix (2013)	Femejism (2016)	Deap Lips (2020)

Singles from Femejism
- 1. "Royal Jelly" Released: November 10, 2015; 2. "Smile More" Released: June 7, 2016

Femejism is the second studio album by American rock duo Deap Vally. It was released in September 2016 by Nevado Music. The album was produced by Yeah Yeah Yeahs' guitarist Nick Zinner. He makes an appearance in the video for the first single, "Royal Jelly", which also featured the British model Georgia May Jagger.

== Promotion ==
Music videos were produced and released for all but three songs on the album. The first of which was Royal Jelly, and it was published on Nov 10, 2015. Over the next two and a half years, Deap Vally debuted music videos for Smile More, Gonnawanna, Little Baby Beauty Queen, Critic, Julian, Turn It Off, Two Seat Bike, Post Funk and Grunge Bond. In the Gonnawanna video, fellow Los-Angeles musician Kiran Gandhi was featured.

== Critical reception ==
Professional ratings
Aggregate scores
Source	Rating
Metacritic	74/100
Review scores
Source	Rating
AllMusic	4/5 stars
Clash	(8/10)
Classic Rock	4/5 stars
Consequence of Sound	C+
DIY	4/5 stars
NME	4/5 stars
Vice	A−

Femejism was met with "generally favorable" reviews from critics. At Metacritic, which assigns a weighted average rating out of 100 to reviews from mainstream publications, this release received an average score of 74, based on 13 reviews.

== Track listing ==
No.	Title	Length
1.	"Royal Jelly"	4:03
2.	"Julian"	3:13
3.	"Gonnawanna"	3:47
4.	"Little Baby Beauty Queen"	3:21
5.	"Smile More"	4:31
6.	"Critic"	3:27
7.	"Post Funk"	3:51
8.	"Two Seat Bike"	3:23
9.	"Bubble Baby"	4:21
10.	"Teenage Queen"	4:36
11.	"Grunge Bond"	2:30
12.	"Turn It Off"	4:15
13.	"Heart Is an Animal"	4:19

Japan bonus tracks
No.	Title	Length
14.	"Smile More" (acoustic)
15.	"Critic" (live acoustic)

== Personnel ==
- Alex Deyoung – mastering
- Nathanial Eras – percussion
- Charles Godfrey – engineer
- Chris Kasych – engineer
- Samur Khouja – engineer
- Lauren Fay Levy – percussion
- Rachel McCollum – artwork, design, photography
- Lars Stalfors – mixing
- John Stavas – photography
- Deap Vally – producer
- Sadaharu Yagi – engineer
- Nick Zinner – producer

== Charts ==
Chart performance for Femejism
Chart (2016)	Peak position
Scottish Albums (Official Charts)	46
UK Albums (Official Charts)	50
UK Independent Albums (Official Charts)	11
UK Rock & Metal Albums (Official Charts)	4
