= The Pity Party =

American rock band

- The Pity Party at Tiny Vaudeville. Photo: Scott Schultz

Background information
- Origin: Los Angeles, USA
- Genres: rock
- Years active: 2005 in music-present
- Members: Heisenflei (Julie Edwards) & M
- Website: The Pity Party Facebook Page

The Pity Party is a two-piece band from Los Angeles composed of Julie Edwards, aka Heisenflei (simultaneous drums, keyboards, and vocals) and Marc Smollin (guitar, vocals). They are the first band without representation to score a full-page feature in NME. The Pity Party's artwork is created exclusively by Ronald Dzerigian.

== Biography ==
Heisenflei and Smollin met in high school, where they sang in choir together. In 2004 they recorded their first music on a digital 8-track recorder in Heisenflei's studio apartment in Silverlake, California. Their first self-release was The EP (produced by Noah Shain) in 2006; champions of the environment, Heisenflei and Smollin folded and glued 750 CD sleeves made out of recycled cereal boxes. Their second self-released EP, Orgy Porgy (produced by Stevehimself) was recorded at Moonshine Studios. The group used recycled billboard vinyl to create 1,000 CD jackets which were hand sewn and screen printed with six unique images by artist Ronald Dzerigian.

In July 2007, Los Angeles' Indie 103.1FM KDLD featured The Pity Party live in its "Also I Like to Rock" series at The Hammer Museum. They have received attention from members of the band Ozomatli who played "The War Between 8 & 4" on their show Ozolocal on LA's Star 98.7FM KYSR. "Guru of the soon-to-be-great," John Kennedy, has included "H.O.T.S." on his playlist for his highly popular show X-Posure on XFM London. Additionally, The Pity Party presented RUBBISH, a celebration of trash, at Echo Curio Art Gallery in Echo Park. For the event, The Pity Party produced 100 limited edition EPs with recycled billboard vinyl sleeves. While the band performed, artist Ronald Dzerigian drew a unique image on the sleeve of each distributed CD.

== Tours ==
2007 w/ The Raveonettes
2009 Tour of Tears with The Happy Hollows and Rumspringa (band)

== Critical acclaim ==
Voted No. 1 MySpace Band (2008) by Supersweet
Voted Best Band in LA (2007) by LA Weekly
Flyer of the Week (July 3, 2008) by LA Weekly's Mark Mauer.
Kat Corbett spins "Love Lies" on Los Angeles' KROQ-FM 106.7 Locals Only (November 9, 2008)
"Yours, That Works" named in Best 10 Tracks of 2008 by Time Out London
Winner of 826LA's Battle of the Bands (2009)

== Discography ==
The EP (2006)
Orgy Porgy (2008)
Rubbish (2008) [Limited Edition]
Hotwork EP (2009)
Chickens In Love Compilation (Origami Vinyl, 2010)

== Trivia ==
Heisenflei plays drums in two-piece Deap Vally. Heisenflei's brother is guitarist Greg Edwards from Autolux.
Heisenflei founded a knitting shop in Los Angeles called The Little Knittery.
Heisenflei played drums for The Raveonettes in February 2009.
Heisenflei sings on Nolens Volens, the second album of The Deadly Syndrome.
