= You'll Be Fine (song) =

2018 single by Palaye Royale

Single by Palaye Royale

from the album Boom Boom Room (Side B)
- Released: July 19, 2018
- Recorded: Spring 2018
- Length: 3:35
- Label: Sumerian
- Songwriters: Emerson Barrett; Sebastian Danzig; Remington Leith; Kevin Dotson; Matt Pauling
- Producer: Kevin Dotson

Palaye Royale singles chronology
"Live Like We Want To" (2016)	"You'll Be Fine" (2018)	"Death Dance" (2018)

Music video
- "You'll Be Fine" on YouTube

"You'll Be Fine" is a single by American rock band Palaye Royale. The single was released on July 18, 2018 through Sumerian Records. The song is the lead single off of the band's second studio album, Boom Boom Room (Side B).

== Music video ==
A corresponding music video to the single was also released on July 19, 2018. The music video, directed by Frankie Nasso, shows the band playing to a group of mannqueins in a small room before alternating scenes between the band driving a convertible in the desert. Miryam Rabinowitz produced the music video, Alexander Lamburini lead photography, Steven Contreras edited the video, and additional footage was provided by Michael Bolten.

The music video was shot in one day.

== Charts ==
"You'll Be Fine" was the first single by the band to chart, reaching number 22 on the Billboard Mainstream Rock chart in the United States.

Chart (2018)	Peak position
US Mainstream Rock (Billboard)	22
