= Deap Lips =

American rock supergroup from Oklahoma City

- Origin: Oklahoma City, Oklahoma, United States
- Genres: Alternative Rock, Garage Rock, Neo-psychedelia
- Years active: 2019-present
- Label: Cooking Vinyl
- Members: Wayne Coyne, Steven Drozd, Lindsey Troy, Julie Edwards
- Website: www.flaminglips.com, www.deapvally.com

Deap Lips is an American rock band formed in 2019 in Oklahoma City, Oklahoma, and is a collaboration of The Flaming Lips and Deap Vally. Deap Lips are Wayne Coyne and Steven Drozd of The Flaming Lips and Lindsey Troy and Julie Edwards of Deap Vally. The two band's relationship sparked when Coyne went to see Deap Vally in concert and met Lindsey Troy and gave her his phone number. Deap Vally later came out to Oklahoma City to jam with The Flaming Lips and recorded some songs for their collaboration. On March 13, 2020, the band released their first self-titled album Deap Lips through Cooking Vinyl. The album featured a cover version of the Steppenwolf song "The Pusher".

== Discography ==
- Deap Lips (2020, Cooking Vinyl)
