= Deap Vally =

American rock duo

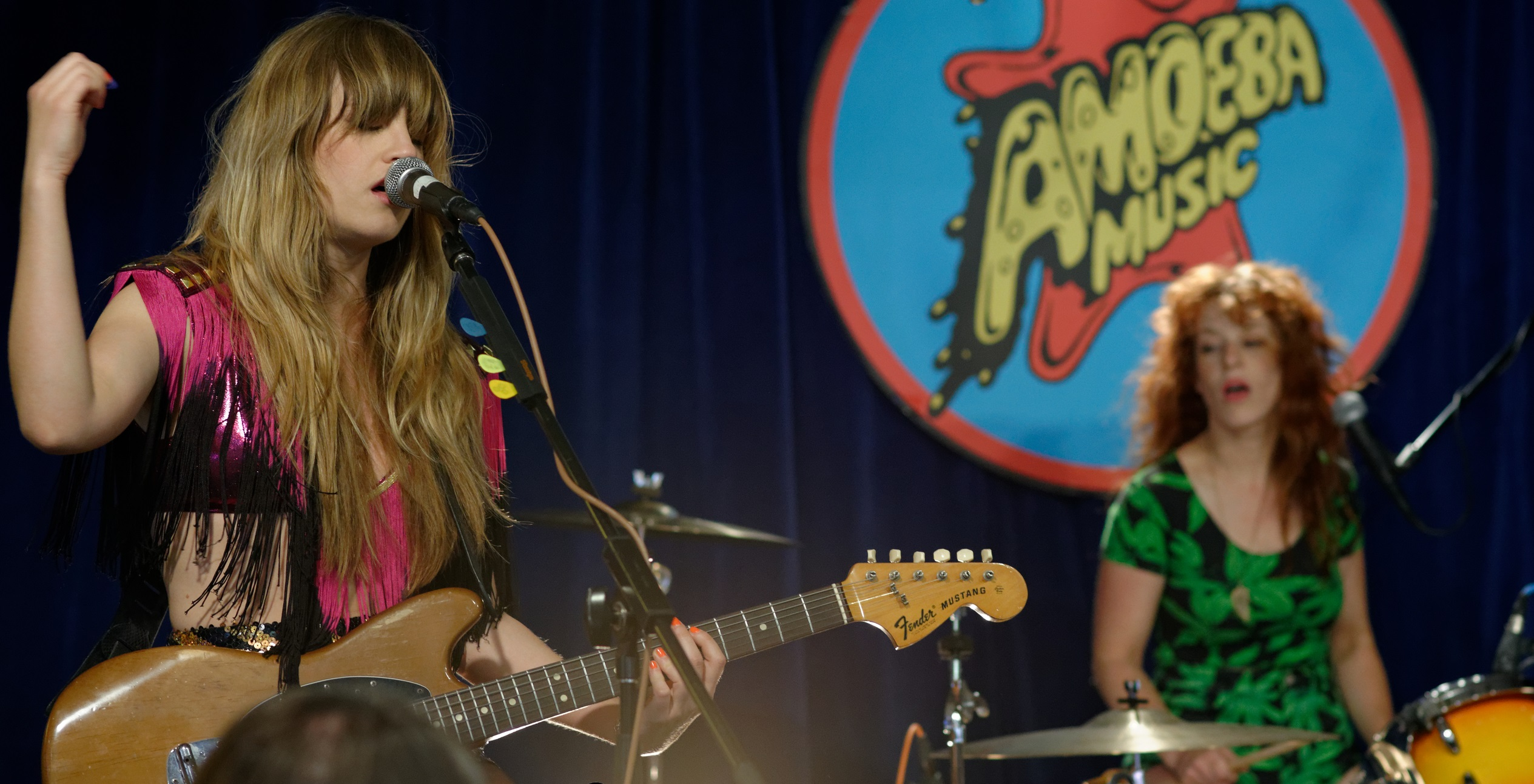
- Deap Vally in 2014

Background information
- Origin: Los Angeles, California, United States
- Genres: Alternative rock; garage rock; blues rock
- Years active: 2011–2024
- Labels: Ark Recordings; Cooking Vinyl; Island; Communion
- Spinoffs: Deap Lips
- Members: Lindsey Troy; Julie Edwards
- Website: www.deapvally.com

Deap Vally was an American rock duo, formed in Los Angeles, California in 2011. The group consisted of Lindsey Troy (guitar, vocals) and Julie Edwards (drums, vocals). They released four albums, four EPs, and a number of singles. Two of their albums charted on the UK Albums Chart.

== History ==
Deap Vally formed in 2011 and was made up of Lindsey Troy and Julie Edwards, originally from the San Fernando Valley, California. Edwards was a member of the Pity Party, while Troy was performing in Los Angeles as a solo artist. Edwards met Troy at a crochet class in Silver Lake, Los Angeles.

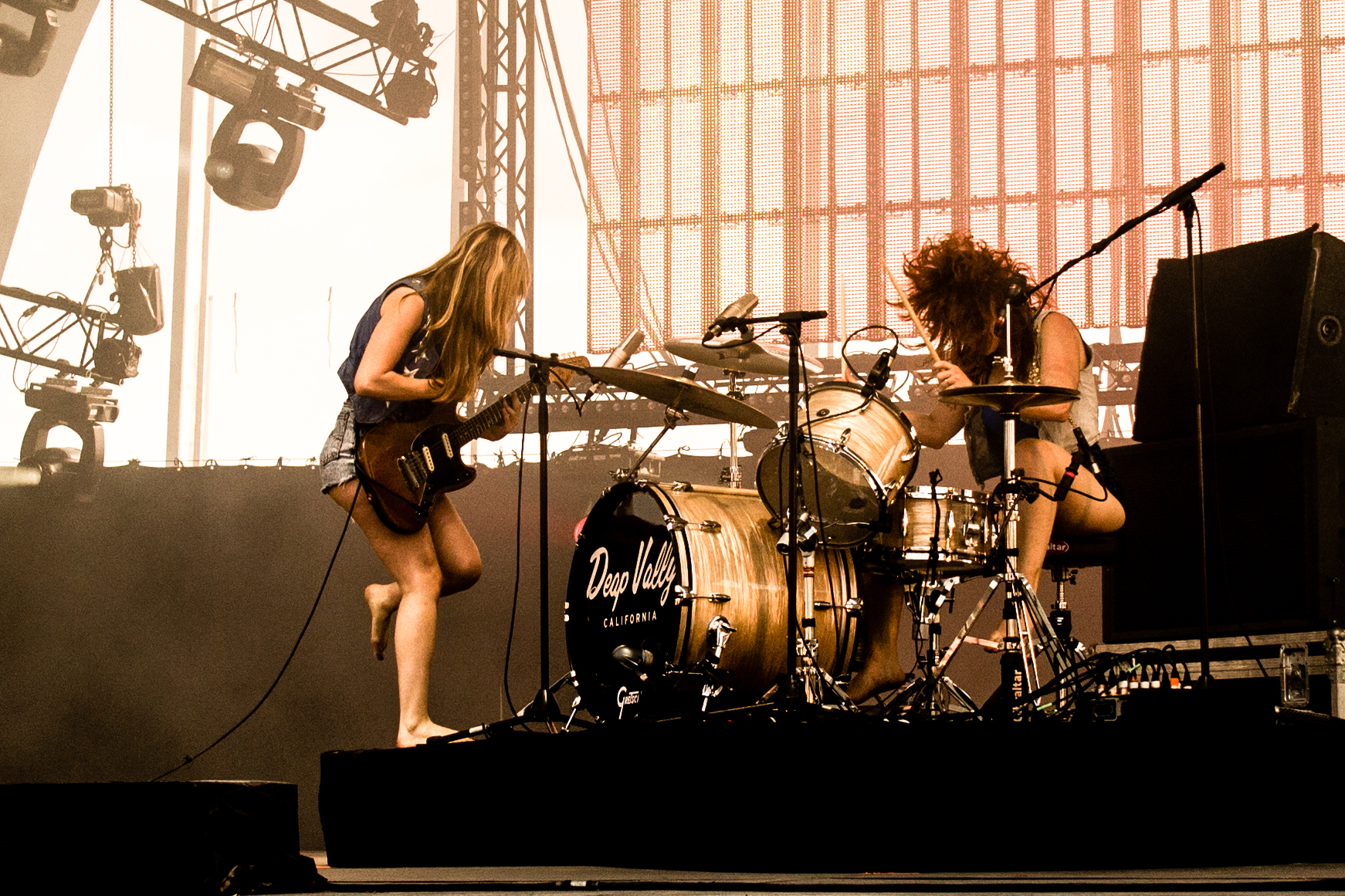
Deap Vally in 2013

In July 2012, they released their first single, "Gonna Make My Own Money", on Ark Recordings, while they made their London debut in the same month. In August 2012, the band signed to Island Records, while they played the Latitude and Leeds and Reading Festival during the summer. Their first single on Island/Communion, "End of the World", debuted as Zane Lowe's Hottest Record In The World on BBC Radio 1 on October 3, 2012, and the band played the BBC Radio Rocks Week with a live concert from London's Maida Vale Studios on October 24. Their debut album was recorded at Infrasound Studio, San Pedro, Los Angeles with Lars Stalfors (The Mars Volta).

In November 2012, they supported the English band the Vaccines on their UK tour. They opened for English rock band Muse in Finland, Germany and the Baltic states.

In April 2013 the duo released the four-track EP "Get Deap" produced by Lars Stalfors. In May 2013, they appeared on BBC2's Later... with Jools Holland. In June 2013, they appeared at the Glastonbury Festival and Bonnaroo Music Festival.

Deap Vally's debut album named Sistrionix was released under Island Records / Communion on June 24, 2013.

In early 2015 they opened for Marilyn Manson during The Hell Not Hallelujah tour. In October 2015 they opened for Peaches during the Rub Tour. In early 2016 they opened for Wolfmother during the Gypsy Caravan tour. In mid-2016, they started opening for the Red Hot Chili Peppers across Europe.

After parting ways with Island Records in early 2016, the band released their second album, Femejism, on September 16, 2016. The album was produced by Nick Zinner of Yeah Yeah Yeah's.

In Summer 2017 they opened for Garbage and Blondie as part of the Rage and Rapture tour.

At the end of 2019, Deap Vally announced an album in collaboration with the Flaming Lips under the combined name Deap Lips and released a single, "Home Thru Hell".

In January 2021, the duo announced their Digital Dream EP, which was released on February 26. Their second EP of 2021, American Cockroach, was released on June 18.

In September 2023, the duo announced their decision to disband, following a farewell tour scheduled for the first half of 2024.

In February 2024, the band released Sistrionix 2.0 on their own record label, Deap Vally Records. The album is a re-recording of their debut album Sistrionix, and includes additional content such as b-sides, early demos, and previously unreleased tracks.

Deap Vally played their last show in Bristol, England on June 9, 2024.

== Style ==
Deap Vally have been described as "a scuzzy White Stripes-meets Led Zeppelin rock and roll duo" who play "hard-riffing blues-rock".

== Discography ==
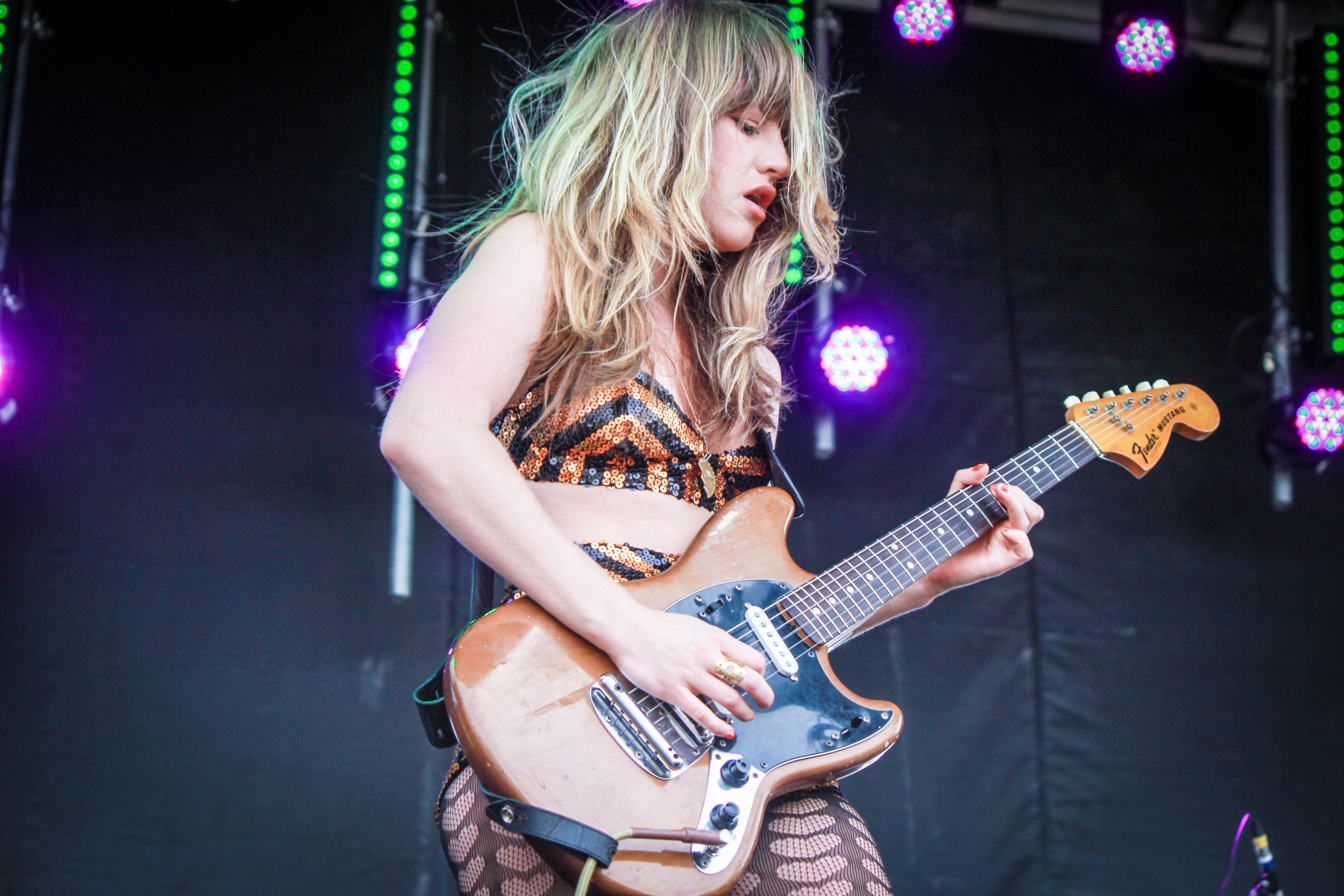
Deap Valley's Lindsey Troy performs at Sasquatch Music Festival 2014

=== Studio albums ===
- Sistrionix (June 24, 2013) on Island
- Femejism (September 16, 2016)
- Marriage (November 19, 2021)

=== Re-Recorded Album ===
- Sistrionix 2.0 (February 1, 2024)

=== EPs ===
- Get Deap! (2013)
- Digital Dream (2021)
- American Cockroach (2021)
- (Ep)ilogue (2024)

=== Singles ===
- "Gonna Make My Own Money" (July 2012) on Ark Recordings
- "End of the World" (November 19, 2012) on Island/Communion
- "Motherfuckers Got to Go" (February 21, 2020) on Cooking Vinyl

== See also ==
Deap Lips
