= Midge Ure discography =

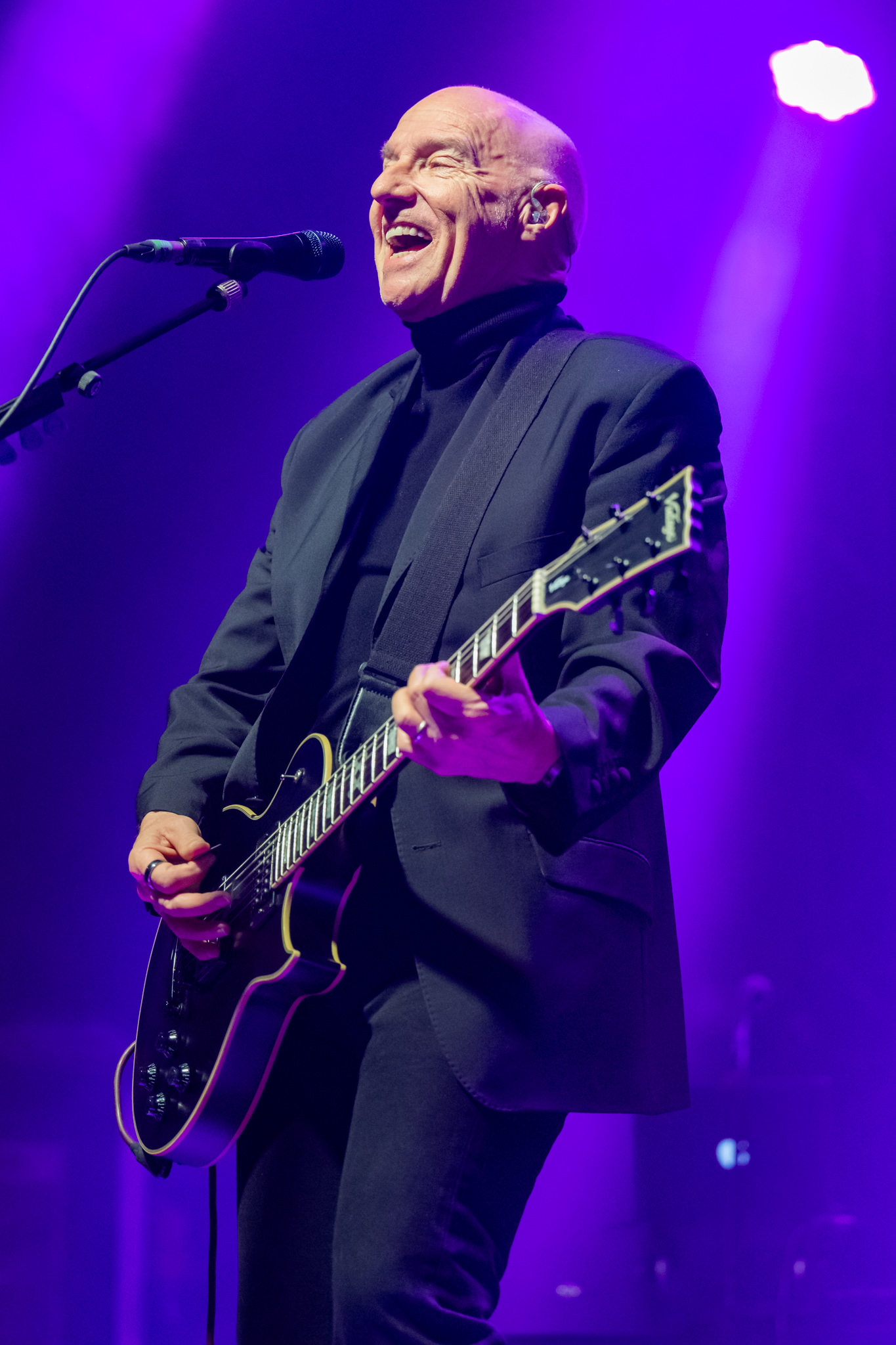
- Ure in 2025
- Studio albums: 9
- Soundtrack albums: 1
- Live albums: 15
- Compilation albums: 9
- Singles: 25
- Video albums: 4

The solo discography of the Scottish singer and musician Midge Ure consists of nine studio albums, fifteen live albums, one soundtrack album, nine compilation albums, four video albums and twenty-five singles. In 1985, he released his debut solo album The Gift which spawned the internationally successful single "If I Was" which was released in September 1985 to commercial success, reaching number one in the United Kingdom and Ireland, whilst reaching the top ten in West Germany, Austria, New Zealand and Belgium. It was subsequently certified Silver by the British Phonographic Industry (BPI) for sales in excess of 250,000 copies. The album, The Gift peaked at number two on the albums charts in the United Kingdom whilst also charting in territories including Sweden, Australia and the Netherlands. It was subsequently certified Gold by the BPI in the United Kingdom.

His second album, Answers to Nothing (1988) was released to moderate success, reaching the top thirty in the United Kingdom and eighty-eight on the US Billboard 200. His 1988 single "Dear God" reached number ninety-five on the US Billboard Hot 100 and peaked at number four on the US Billboard Modern Rock Charts. Follow-up albums, Pure (1991) and Breathe (1996), were released to less commercial success, but still charted within the top 100 of the UK Albums Charts. In 1993, his compilation album, If I Was: The Very Best of Midge Ure & Ultravox was certified Silver by the BPI in the United Kingdom. His fifth album, Move Me (2000) failed to chart, but Ure returned to the albums charts in the United Kingdom with his sixth album Fragile (2014). In 2017, he released Orchestrated which became his highest charting album in the United Kingdom since Answers to Nothing (1991).

== Albums ==
=== Studio albums ===
Title	Album details	Peak chart positions									
Title	Album details	UK	AUS	AUT	CAN	GER	NL	NZ	SWE	SWI	US
The Gift	Released: 7 October 1985; Label: Chrysalis; Formats: CD, LP, MC	2	29	—	32	28	42	24	25	—	— (Note: The Gift didn't enter the Billboard 200, but did peak at number 164 on the Cash Box Top 200.)
Answers to Nothing	Released: 30 August 1988; Label: Chrysalis; Formats: CD, LP, MC	30	—	—	—	—	—	—	—	—	88
Pure	Released: 16 September 1991; Label: Arista; Formats: CD, LP, MC	36	—	—	—	—	—	—	49	—	—
Breathe	Released: March 1996; Label: BMG; Formats: CD, MC	95	—	10	—	63	—	—	—	22	—
Move Me	Released: 25 September 2000; Label: Arista; Formats: CD, MC	—	—	—	—	—	—	—	—	—	—
10	Released: 29 September 2008; Label: Hypertension; Formats: CD, digital download	—	—	—	—	—	—	—	—	—	—
Fragile	Released: 7 July 2014; Label: Hypertension; Formats: CD, LP, digital download	66	—	—	—	—	—	—	—	—	—
Orchestrated	Released: 1 December 2017; Label: BMG; Formats: CD, 2×LP, digital download	33	—	—	—	—	—	—	—	—	— (Note: Orchestrated peaked at number 10 on the Classical Albums chart.)
A Man of Two Worlds	Released: 8 May 2026; Label: Chrysalis; Formats: CD, 2×LP, digital download	63	—	—	—	—	—	—	—	—	—
"—" denotes releases that did not chart or were not released in that territory.

=== Live albums ===
Title	Album details
Live in Concert	Released: 25 October 1999; Label: Strange Fruit; Formats: CD; Recorded at the Manchester Apollo on 12 November 1991
A Glorious Noise – 'Breathe' Live	Released: 2001; Label: Environment; Formats: CD; Recorded at the Live Music Hall, Cologne, Germany on 25 May 1998
Intimate Moments – April 12–22 2002	Released: 2002; Label: Environment; Formats: 2xCD
One Night In Scotland – Nov 21st 1988	Released: 2002; Label: Environment; Formats: CD
Once Upon a Time in America	Released: 2003; Label: Environment; Formats: CD+VCD; Recordings from June and July 1989
Septemberfest	Released: 2004; Label: Environment; Formats: CD+VCD; Recordings from August and September 1996 in Germany and Switzerland
Re*Live – Sampled Looped & Trigger Happy on Tour	Released: April 2005; Label: Environment; Formats: CD; Recorded during the 2003 tour
Duet (with Troy Donockley)	Released: May 2006; Label: Environment; Formats: CD; Recorded in 1998/1999
A Live Christmas Gift	Released: December 2007; Label: Environment; Formats: CD; Recorded in October and December 1985
Intimate Moments 2	Released: 2008; Label: Environment; Formats: CD+DVD; CD recording from Germany in 2006; DVD recording from Scotland in 2007
Live in Chicago	Released: 9 June 2013; Label: Environment; Formats: CD; Recorded in 2013 during US tour
Breathe Again Live and Extended	Released: 30 October 2015; Label: Oblivion; Formats: 2xCD, digital download; Recorded in Scotland between 16 and 21 March 2015
Something from Everything	Released: 28 November 2016; Label: Environment; Formats: CD, digital download; Recorded live and in rehearsals in 2016
Band Electronica Live	Released: 2018; Label: Environment; Formats: CD; Recorded in Newcastle and Berlin in 2017
Live at the Hammersmith Apollo 2018	Released: 2019; Label: Environment; Formats: LP
Live at The Royal Albert Hall 04.10.23	Released: 8 November 2024; Recorded live at Ure's 70th birthday concert

=== Soundtrack albums ===
Title	Album details
Went to Coney Island on a Mission from God... Be Back by Five	Released: 19 September 2000; Label: EvenMore Entertainment; Formats: CD

=== Compilation albums ===
Title	Album details	Peak chart positions
Title	Album details	UK
If I Was: The Very Best of Midge Ure & Ultravox	Released: 22 February 1993; Label: Chrysalis; Formats: CD, LP, MC	10
If I Was	Released: March 1997; Label: Disky; Formats: CD	—
No Regrets: The Very Best of Midge Ure	Released: October 2000; Label: EMI; Formats: LP, MC	—
The Very Best of Midge Ure & Ultravox	Released: 29 October 2001; Label: EMI; Formats: CD	45
Little Orphans	Released: 12 November 2001; Label: Environment; Formats: CD; Collection of previously unreleased tracks	—
Finest	Released: 16 April 2004; Label: EMI; Formats: 2xCD	—
The Works	Released: 25 March 2013; Label: Music Club; Formats: 2×CD	—
Soundtrack: 1978–2019	Released: 20 September 2019; Label: Chrysalis; Formats: 2×CD+DVD, LP, digital download	75
Chapters – The Best Of	Released: 13 November 2026; Label: Chrysalis; Formats: CD, 3×CD, 2×LP, digital download	47
"—" denotes releases that did not chart.

=== Video albums ===
Title	Album details
Answers – A Musical Biography	Released: 1990; Label: Chrysalis; Formats: VHS, LaserDisc
Rewind – The Greatest Hits Tour	Released: 15 July 2002; Label: Eagle Vision; Formats: DVD
Re*Live – Sampled Looped & Trigger Happy on Tour	Released: 2005; Label: Hypertension; Formats: DVD
Hammer Summer 2005	Released: 2005; Label: Environment; Formats: DVD

== Singles ==
Title	Year	Peak chart positions										Album
Title	Year	UK	AUS	AUT	GER	IRE	NL	NZ	SWI	US	US Alt	Album
"No Regrets"	1982	9	53	—	—	11	—	35	—	—	—	Non-album singles
"After a Fashion" (with Mick Karn)	1983	39	—	—	—	—	—	—	—	—	—	Non-album singles
"If I Was"	1985	1	10	6	2	1	12	8	16	—	—	The Gift
"That Certain Smile"	1985	28	—	—	54	25	—	—	—	—	—	The Gift
"Wastelands"	1986	46	—	—	—	—	—	—	—	—	—	The Gift
"Call of the Wild"	1986	27	—	—	—	—	—	—	—	—	—	Non-album single
"Answers to Nothing"	1988	49	—	—	—	—	—	—	—	—	26	Answers to Nothing
"Dear God"	1988	55	—	—	—	—	29	—	—	95	4	Answers to Nothing
"Cold, Cold Heart"	1991	17	—	26	47	21	—	—	—	—	12	Pure
"I See Hope in the Morning Light"	1991	77	—	—	—	—	—	—	—	—	—	Pure
"Let It Go?" (Europe-only release)	1992	—	—	—	—	—	—	—	—	—	—	Pure
"Breathe"	1996	70	—	1	12	—	—	—	17	—	—	Breathe
"Guns and Arrows"	1996	166	—	—	—	—	—	—	—	—	—	Breathe
"Fields of Fire" (Europe-only release)	1998	—	—	—	—	—	—	—	—	—	—	Breathe
"We Came to Dance" (Tron featuring Midge Ure)	2000	—	—	—	—	—	—	—	—	—	—	Non-album single
"You Move Me" (promo-only release)	2000	—	—	—	—	—	—	—	—	—	—	Move Me
"Beneath a Spielberg Sky"	2001	—	—	—	—	—	—	—	—	—	—	Move Me
"New Europeans" (Germany promo-only release)	2005	—	—	—	—	—	—	—	—	—	—	Non-album singles
"Alone" (Germany promo-only release)	2006	—	—	—	—	—	—	—	—	—	—	Non-album singles
"Personal Heaven" (with X-Perience; Germany-only release)	2007	—	—	—	64	—	—	—	—	—	—	Lost in Paradise
"Man of the World"	2008	—	—	—	—	—	—	—	—	—	—	Non-album singles
"The Voice" (The Disco Boys featuring Midge Ure; Germany-only release)	2009	—	—	—	—	—	—	—	—	—	—	Non-album singles
"Become" (Europe promo-only release)	2014	—	—	—	—	—	—	—	—	—	—	Fragile
"Dark Dark Night" (featuring Moby; Europe promo-only release)	2015	—	—	—	—	—	—	—	—	—	—	Fragile
"Das Beat" (Band Electronica featuring Midge Ure)	2022	—	—	—	—	—	—	—	—	—	—	Non-album single
"—" denotes releases that did not chart or were not released in that territory.

=== Other appearances ===
- "The Man Who Sold the World" on Party Party soundtrack (1982)
- "Baby Little One" on Lullabies with a Difference by various artists (1998)
- "Something to Remind Me" on Tripomatic Fairytales 3003 by Jam & Spoon (2003)
- "Smile" on Colour by Andy Hunter (2008)
- "Let It Rise" on Atemlos by Schiller (2010)
- "Taking Back My Time" on International Blue by Stephen Emmer (2014)
- "Endless Moments" on Lichtmond 3: Days of Eternity by Lichtmond (2014)
- "Pure" on Conchita by Conchita Wurst (2015)
- "Touching Hearts and Skies" on Fly (Songs Inspired by the Film Eddie the Eagle) (2016)
- "Glorious" on Welcome to the Dancefloor by Rusty Egan (2017)
