= If I Was: The Very Best of Midge Ure & Ultravox =

Compilation album by Midge Ure and Ultravox
- Released: 22 February 1993
- Genre: New wave; synthpop
- Label: Chrysalis
- Producer: Bruce Harris; John Hudson; Mick Karn; Phil Lynott; George Martin; Conny Plank; Ultravox; Midge Ure; Visage; Rick Walton; Kit Woolven

Midge Ure chronology
Pure (1991)	If I Was: The Very Best of Midge Ure & Ultravox (1993)	Breathe (1996)

Ultravox chronology
U-Vox (1986)	If I Was: The Very Best of Midge Ure & Ultravox (1993)	Revelation (1993)

Professional ratings
Review scores
Source	Rating
AllMusic	4.5/5 stars

If I Was: The Very Best of Midge Ure & Ultravox is a 1993 compilation album by Scottish musician Midge Ure, featuring songs from his solo career and as part of the new wave and synthpop band Ultravox, along with Ure's collaborations with Mick Karn ("After a Fashion"), Phil Lynott ("Yellow Pearl"), Visage ("Fade to Grey"), and charity supergroup Band Aid ("Do They Know It's Christmas?").

== Track listing ==
Standard edition
No.	Title	Writer(s)	Performer(s)	Length
1.	"If I Was" (from The Gift)	Midge Ure; Danny Mitchell	Midge Ure	5:21
2.	"No Regrets" (non-album single)	Tom Rush	Midge Ure	4:02
3.	"Love's Great Adventure" (from The Collection)	Warren Cann; Billy Currie; Ure; Chris Cross	Ultravox	3:08
4.	"Dear God" (from Answers to Nothing)	Ure	Midge Ure	5:02
5.	"Cold Cold Heart" (from Pure)	Ure	Midge Ure	4:06
6.	"Vienna" (from Vienna)	Cann; Currie; Ure; Cross	Ultravox	4:38
7.	"Call of the Wild" (non-album single)	Ure; Mitchell; Colin King	Midge Ure	4:21
8.	"After a Fashion" (non-album single)	Ure; Mick Karn	Midge Ure and Mick Karn	3:59
9.	"Dancing with Tears in My Eyes" (from Lament)	Cann; Currie; Ure; Cross	Ultravox	4:10
10.	"All Fall Down" (from U-Vox)	Ure; Cross; Currie	Ultravox	5:09
11.	"Yellow Pearl" (from Solo in Soho)	Phil Lynott; Ure	Phil Lynott	3:20
12.	"Fade to Grey" (from Visage)	Currie; Chris Payne; Ure	Visage	3:47
13.	"Reap the Wild Wind" (from Quartet)	Cann; Currie; Ure; Cross	Ultravox	3:43
14.	"Answers to Nothing" (from Answers to Nothing)	Ure	Midge Ure	3:40
15.	"Do They Know It's Christmas?" (non-album single)	Bob Geldof; Ure	Band Aid	3:47
16.	"That Certain Smile" (from The Gift)	Ure; Mitchell	Midge Ure	4:09

US bonus track
No.	Title	Writer(s)	Performer(s)	Length
17.	"The Man Who Sold the World" (non-album single)	David Bowie	Midge Ure	5:30

== Personnel ==
Adapted from AllMusic.

- Ultravox – performer, primary artist, producer
- Midge Ure – guitar, instrumentation, keyboards, performer, primary artist, producer, remixing, vocals
- Barry Adamson – bass
- Craig Armstrong – piano
- Chris Ballin – background vocals
- Band Aid – primary artist
- Gary Barnacle – brass, horn
- Angie Brown – background vocals
- Mark Brzezicki – drums
- Steve Brzezicki – bass
- Billy Burrie – keyboards, violin
- Kate Bush – guest artist, vocals
- Ali Campbell – vocals
- Robin Campbell – vocals
- Warren Cann – drums
- Jackie Challenor – background vocals
- The Chieftains – guest artist
- Chris Cross – bass
- Sheilah Cuffy – background vocals
- Carol Douet – background vocals
- Yona Dunsford – background vocals
- Gwen Dupree – background vocals
- Rusty Egan – drums
- Lindsey Elliott – drums
- Geoff Emerick – engineer
- Dave Formula – keyboards
- Phil Gannon – background vocals
- Glenn Gregory – background vocals
- Bruce Harris – executive producer, producer
- Trevor Ray Hart – photography
- John Hudson – engineer, producer
- Kenny Hyslop – drums, percussion
- Sylvia Mason-James – background vocals
- Lorenza Johnson – background vocals
- Mick Karn – bass, primary artist, producer
- Carol Kenyon – background vocals
- Robbie Kilgore – keyboards
- Mark King – bass
- Maxwell Langdown – speech/speaker/speaking part, voices
- Phil Lynott – guest artist, performer, primary artist, producer
- George Martin – producer
- Glen Matlock – bass, vocals
- Michael McCloud – background vocals
- John McGeoch – guitar
- Jim McGinlay – bass
- Billy McIsaac – keyboards, vocals
- Mae McKenna – background vocals
- Ian McLagan – guest artist, piano
- Jeremy Meehan – bass
- Paddy Moloney – tin whistle, uilleann pipes, whistle
- Paul Mosby – mizmar, synthesizer
- Steve New – guitar, vocals
- Simon Phillips – drums
- Josh Phillips-Gorse – keyboards, mellophonium, Mellotron
- Conny Plank – producer
- Kevin Powell – bass
- Nigel Ross-Scott – bass
- Vicki St. James – background vocals
- Jackie Sheridan – background vocals
- Peter Sherrard – photography
- Kate Stephenson – background vocals
- Steve Strange – guest artist, vocals
- John Thirkell – brass
- Peter Thoms – brass
- Vincent M. Vero – project coordinator, research
- Visage – performer, primary artist, producer
- Rick Walton – engineer, producer
- Ricci P. Washington – background vocals
- Derek Watkins – brass
- Steve Williams – electronic percussion, percussion
- Kit Woolven – producer

== Charts and certifications ==
=== Weekly charts ===
Chart (1993)	Peak position
UK Albums Chart	10

=== Certifications ===
Region	Certification	Certified units/sales
United Kingdom (BPI)	Silver	60,000^{^}
^{^} Shipments figures based on certification alone.
