= Same Old Story (Ultravox song) =

Single by Ultravox

from the album U-Vox
- B-side: "3"; "All in One Day (Instrumental)"
- Released: September 15, 1986
- Recorded: 1986
- Genre: Pop rock; new wave
- Length: 3:58
- Label: Chrysalis Records
- Songwriters: Chris Cross; Billy Currie; Midge Ure
- Producers: Ultravox; Conny Plank

Ultravox singles chronology
"Love's Great Adventure" (1986)	"Same Old Story" (1986)	"All Fall Down" (1986)

"Same Old Story" is a 1986 single by the British new wave band Ultravox. It was the first single to be taken from their eighth album U-Vox, and was released on September 15, 1986.

== Background ==
Now a trio, without original drummer Warren Cann, the single took Ultravox in a new musical direction. "Same Old Story" featured jazzy brass by Beggar and Co, and female vocals in the chorus by Carol Kenyon. Frontman Midge Ure felt that, by 1986, it was clear that Ultravox was now a very different entity.

Mark Brzezicki was hired in and played drums on the album. In the music video of "Same Old Story" Pat Ahern played drums, and he also toured with the band on the U-Vox European Tour.

The B-side was the instrumental track "3", which featured rhythms, synthesizers and Billy Currie's recognizable piano.

On the 12-inch single, there was an instrumental version of the U-Vox album track "All in One Day", which featured an orchestra conducted and arranged by George Martin.

"Same Old Story" reached 31 in UK Singles Chart.

== Critical reception ==
Upon its release, Smash Hits reviewer Ian Cranna wrote: "Take away the trendy, loud girls singers and punctuating brass "riffs" and this sounds particularly dull and ponderous, even by Ultravox's lead-booted standards."

== Track listing ==
=== 7" version ===
1. "Same Old Story" – 3:58
2. "3" – 4:01

=== 12" version ===
1. "Same Old Story (Extended Mix)" – 6:57
2. "3" – 4:01
3. "All in One Day (Instrumental)" – 6:12
