= Brzezicki =

Brzezicki (feminine: Brzezicka; plural: Brzeziccy) is a Polish surname. Notable people with the surname include:

- Juan Pablo Brzezicki (born 1982), Argentine tennis player
- Mark Brzezicki (born 1957), English musician
- Steve Brzezicki, English musician, younger brother of Mark
