= Move Me =

Move Me may refer to:

- Move Me (film), a 2003 Danish comedy film
- Move Me (Nazareth album), 1994
- Move Me (Midge Ure album), 2000
- "Move Me" (Lewis OfMan and Carly Rae Jepsen song), 2022 standalone single
- "Move Me", Charli XCX song from Crash
- "Move Me", Gucci Mane song from Woptober II
- "Move Me", Samantha Fox song from Angel with an Attitude
