= IJK (singer) =

- Born: Imad Jack Karam; 1981 (age 44–45); Beirut, Lebanon
- Genres: Rock, Alternative
- Occupations: Singer-songwriter & Podcaster
- Years active: 2008–present
- Website: http://www.imadjackkaram.com/

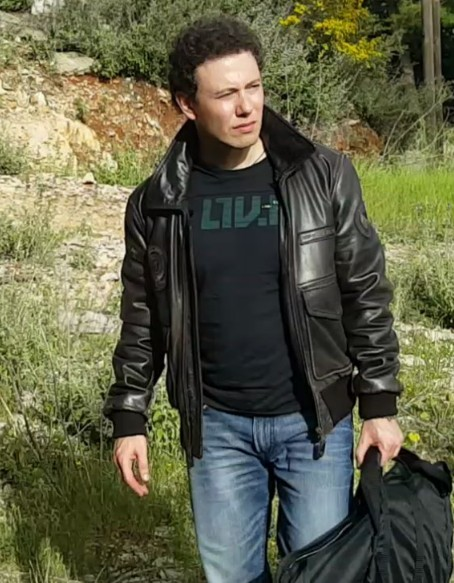
This is a picture of IJK, Lebanese singer-songwriter and podcaster taken on the set of one of his music videos

Imad Jack Karam, known by his initials and stage name IJK, is a Lebanese-Canadian singer-songwriter and podcaster. He is best known for his alternative rock style and crooner sound and has released songs in English and French.

As host of the IJK Podcast, Karam has interviewed subject matter experts and thinkers, including philosopher William Lane Craig and psychologist Robert Cialdini.

== Early years ==
Born in Beirut in 1981, Karam was raised in a Greek Orthodox Christian family and showed a keen interest for music and singing since a very young age.

In 2000, Karam took part in the Lebanese Karaoke Championship, which was broadcast on Télé Liban, and won the third place in the male category. This has been his main motivation to give music a serious shot in later years.

Karam studied computer and communication engineering at Université Saint Joseph graduating with a Master's degree in 2004.

In 2007, he was awarded a Master of Science in Marketing and Management from HEC Paris.

== UK Recording Sessions ==
In 2009, IJK worked with a number of British producers including Steve Williams (who collaborated with big artists such as Sting) and recorded his own music at various studios in London including The Way and The Chapel Studios. The result was his debut EP entitled Dancing Shadows and that included four songs.

IJK then went on tour and played at various venues in London including the legendary but now defunct Bull & Gate.

In May 2016, he released his single “Space Odyssey” which garnered positive reviews from fans and critics.

In June 2017, IJK released his second single and music video entitled "Dancing Shadows".

== Music Style and Theme ==
IJK’s music is characterized by catchy yet sophisticated melodies and a rock and roll inspired style. His music is a combination of piano (or synth) driven rock sound mixed with soaring vocals in the baritone and countertenor range.

His lyrics tackle diverse themes ranging from biographies (“Johnny & June”) to philosophical subjects (“Space Odyssey”).

IJK's animated music video for "Johnny & June" has won the second place in the Asia category at the Anim'Arte film festival in Brazil.

His latest animated short movie "The Red Bond" has been released in March 2023 and has made the official selection at many film festivals while receiving awards at the IndieFest Film Awards, the Reale Film Festival and World Film Carnival Singapore. The movie features a remixed version of IJK's single The Red Light Inn.

During his interview with MTV Lebanon in March 2017, IJK cited U2's Bono as one of his main music influences.

== Discography ==
- The Red Light Inn - Single Remix (2023)
- High Tide - Single (2019)
- Chedd Halak - Single (2019)
- Johnny & June - Single (2018)
- Dancing Shadows - Single (2017)
- Space Odyssey - Single (2016)
