= All Fall Down (Ultravox song) =

Single by Ultravox

from the album U-Vox
- B-side: "Dreams?"; "All Fall Down (Instrumental)"
- Released: November 10, 1986
- Recorded: 1986
- Genre: Celtic folk; drinking song
- Length: 5:07
- Label: Chrysalis Records
- Songwriters: Chris Cross; Billy Currie; Midge Ure
- Producers: Ultravox; Conny Plank

Ultravox singles chronology
| "Same Old Story" (1986) | "All Fall Down" (1986) | "All in One Day" (1987) |

"All Fall Down" is a 1986 song by the British new wave band Ultravox. It was released as the second single from the band's eighth studio album U-Vox on November 10, 1986.

The song's lyrics carry a strong anti-war sentiment. The Irish folk group The Chieftains also guest-performed on "All Fall Down".

After a string of hits in the 1980s, "All Fall Down" would be the band's sixteenth and final Top 40 hit until a remix of their 1981 hit "Vienna" was released in the 1990s.

== Background ==
Ure said in 1986: 'Although we said it before, the main difference is that we´ve no barriers whatsoever, we let its song and its arrangement dictate what that song should sound like. So a song like "All Fall Down" was like you´d imagine a Jacques Brel Celtic protest song to sound, it has a very strong celtic folk feel, with acoustic guitars and instruments. So we used Chieftains on it, went over to Dublin to record them. Although at the time the idea sounded really bizarre, the combination of us and them, a band who supposedly uses technology to its utmost and this band who uses no technology at all, that combination works really well.'

Ure said in 2012: 'The album "U-VOX" is a mess and displays a band falling apart, but in "All Fall Down" we successfully gather ourselves together with folk band The Chieftains in a very easy and powerful folk song.' In 2014, he cited it as the song he is most proud of, adding: "it was one of the first songs I realised would stand up performed 'stripped down'."

== Structure ==
The song consists of two verses and an instrumental theme. It has no (sung) chorus. After the first verse, the theme is introduced and repeated one time. After the second verse, the theme is played as a coda and repeated for about 3 minutes, then faded out. The first and the last note of the theme are identical. In the coda, different from the introduction, the theme begins again with the last note of the preceding repetition; i.e. the theme actually never ends since, when the last note has been played, the next repetition has already begun.

== Release details ==
The B-side is "Dreams?", an ambient medley with a spoken-word part near the end, asking questions about dreams. Midge Ure has since stated that he recorded this straight from a radio show.

The single came with a free bonus single with a live version of "All Fall Down", performed at Wembley Arena in November 1986. From the same concert is a live version of U-Vox track "Dream On" as the B-side.

"All Fall Down" peaked at number 30 on the UK Singles Chart. It would be the band's final hit single, until a remix of "Vienna" charted in the early 1990s.

== Critical reception ==
Among contemporary reviews of "All Fall Down", a reviewer for the Evening Chronicle noted the single's "hard-hitting message". James Brown of Sounds felt that Ultravox's attempt at a political ballad was hard to take seriously due to the band having spent years "playing out their childish fantasies in their videos", adding that the song "is wrapped up in all the 'nasty' thigs in life: a penny whistle, flute and acoustic guitar give it a vaguely Gaelic feel. This is supposedly topical." Barry McIlheney of Smash Hits lamented Ure's perceived transition from mere pop star to a more serious person, as with Bob Geldof, finding that Ure fails to make the lyrics of "All Fall Down" sound important, instead sounding ridiculous. "It's obviously meant to be a major comment on the stupidity of war," McIlheney writes, "which is all very well and good, and can best be compared with, er, Rolf Harris' 'Two Little Boys'."

Retrospectively, Trouser Press consider "All Fall Down" to be an "odd detour" on U-Vox, describing it as "a folky anti-war drinking song with accompaniment by the Chieftains." Jon O'Brien of Classic Pop writes: "It's tough to determine what’s more ham-fisted on second single 'All Fall Down', the attempt at Celtic folk which makes Irish music stalwarts The Chieftains resemble a pub band, or the moon-in-June lyrics that detract from the well-meaning anti-war sentiment", adding: "The idiosyncratic musings of the Foxx era had never seemed so distant."

== Track listing ==
=== 7" version ===
1. "All Fall Down" – 5:07
2. "Dreams?" – 2:30

=== 12" version ===
1. "All Fall Down (Extended Mix)" – 7:40
2. "Dreams?" – 2:30
3. "All Fall Down (Instrumental)" – 5:34

=== 7" bonus single ===
1. "All Fall Down (live 6 Nov 86 at Wembley Arena, London)" – 5:36
2. "Dream On (live 6 Nov 86 at Wembley Arena, London)" – 3:47
