= All in One Day =

Single by Ultravox

from the album U-Vox
- B-side: "Stateless"; "The Prize (Live)"
- Released: June 8, 1987
- Recorded: 1986
- Genre: Pop rock; new wave
- Length: 4:17
- Label: Chrysalis Records
- Songwriters: Chris Cross; Billy Currie; Midge Ure
- Producers: Ultravox; Conny Plank

Ultravox singles chronology
"All Fall Down" (1986)	"All in One Day" (1987)	"Vienna 93" (1993)

"All in One Day" is the final single from Ultravox's 1986 album, U-Vox, released on June 8, 1987. It was the last Ultravox release during their most popular 1980's incarnation with Midge Ure (until 2012). The song was written as a tribute to the Live Aid event and the orchestra was arranged and conducted by George Martin.

It is one of Ultravox's lowest-charting singles, stalling at No. 88 in the UK charts.

Ure said about the track in 1986: "We asked George Martin to arrange an orchestra for it. Billy did some stuff on it, but the rest of us just sat back and watched the orchestra play, which was quite nice, watching someone else perform it for you."

== Track listings ==
=== 7" version ===
1. "All in One Day" – 4:17
2. "The Prize" (live 6 Nov 86 at Wembley Arena, London) - 4:56

=== 12" version ===
1. "All in One Day" (Unedited Version) – 5:13
2. "The Prize (live 6 Nov 86 at Wembley Arena, London)" – 4:56
3. "Stateless" – 2:51

== Charts ==
Chart (1987)	Peak position
UK Singles (OCC)	88
