= The Gift (Midge Ure album) =

Studio album by Midge Ure
- Released: 7 October 1985
- Recorded: 1985
- Studio: Music Fest Studio (London)
- Genre: Synth-pop; electronic; new wave
- Label: Chrysalis
- Producer: Midge Ure

Midge Ure chronology
The Gift (1985)	Answers to Nothing (1988)

Singles from The Gift
- 1. "If I Was" Released: 2 September 1985; 2. "That Certain Smile" Released: 4 November 1985; 3. "Wastelands" Released: 27 January 1986

Professional ratings
Review scores
Source	Rating
AllMusic	link

The Gift is the debut solo studio album by the Scottish musician Midge Ure, released on 7 October 1985 by Chrysalis Records. It was released while his band Ultravox were taking a break; the band would go on to release U-Vox (1986) before breaking up. The album reached No. 2 in the UK Albums Chart partly due to the large attention drawn to it by the single "If I Was" which reached No. 1 on the UK Singles Chart in September 1985. "That Certain Smile" was released as the second single in November 1985, and "Wastelands" was released as the third single in January 1986.

== Background ==
Danny Mitchell and Ure wrote "Wastelands" together for the band Modern Man. They started a songwriting partnership that produced five songs on "The Gift", including a reworking of "Wastelands", which was originally from the Midge Ure-produced Modern Man album Concrete Scheme released in 1980. Ure had built his own new recording studio in his garden in Chiswick, and recorded most of the album there. The title track was dedicated to the 19th-century Scottish architect Charles Rennie Mackintosh.

The Gift features three instrumental tracks, which include "Edo", "The Chieftain" and "Antilles". These instrumentals were recorded on the Caribbean island of Montserrat using a Casio CZ-101. On "Edo", Ure played a koto, which he purchased during Ultravox's first tour in Japan. Ure considered the idea of triggering the sound of a koto through a Yamaha DX7 but he decided against it as he wanted to hear the sound of the fingers scraping the strings.

Reflecting on The Gift in 1989, Ure said that the album presented him with an opportunity to record instrumental music, which Ultravox largely refrained from. He called these efforts "quite successful" and was "quite pleased" with the result.

At the end of October 1985 Ure started The Gift World Tour with Zal Cleminson on guitar, Kevin Powell on bass guitar, Daniel Mitchell and Craig Armstrong on keyboards and Kenny Hyslop on drums. In addition to shows in the UK and Europe, the tour encompassed four shows in United States and Australia, two in Canada, one in Tokyo, and ended with a closing show at Wembley Arena 23 December 1985. Recordings can be found on the super deluxe edition of The Gift released in September 2023.

== Track listing ==
1. "If I Was" (Midge Ure, Mitchell) – 5:22
2. "When the Winds Blow" (Ure, Mitchell) – 4:07
3. "Living in the Past" (Ian Anderson) – 4:35
4. "That Certain Smile" (Ure, Mitchell) – 4:08
5. "The Gift" (Ure) – 5:00
6. "Antilles" (Instrumental) (Ure) – 4:08
7. "Wastelands" (Ure, Mitchell) – 4:40
8. "Edo" (Instrumental) (Ure) – 3:24
9. "The Chieftain" (Instrumental) (Ure) – 4:45
10. "She Cried" (Ure, Mitchell) – 4:12
11. "The Gift (Reprise)" (Ure) – 1:45

Bonus tracks for 1996 UK re-release:

1. "Mood Music" – 3:30
2. "Piano" (Ure) – 2:28
3. "The Man Who Sold the World" (David Bowie) – 5:37
4. "The Gift (Instrumental)" (Ure) – 5:11

Bonus disc for 2010 remastered definitive edition:

1. "No Regrets"
2. "Mood Music"
3. "If I Was" (extended mix)
4. "Piano"
5. "The Man Who Sold the World"
6. "That Certain Smile" (extended mix)
7. "The Gift" (instrumental)
8. "Fade to Grey" (recorded live at Rehearsals 27 September 1985 featuring Mick Ronson on guitar)
9. "Wastelands" (extended mix)
10. "When the Winds Blow" (recorded live at Wembley Arena, 23 Dec 1985)
11. "After a Fashion" (recorded live at Wembley Arena, 23 Dec 1985)
12. "The Chieftain / The Dancer" (recorded live at Wembley Arena, 23 Dec 1985)
13. "Call of the Wild" (extended mix)
14. "That Certain Smile" (recorded live at Wembley Arena, 23 Dec 1985)
15. "The Gift" (recorded live at Wembley Arena, 23 Dec 1985)

== Personnel ==
- Midge Ure – vocals, instrumentation, production
- Mark King – bass guitar (tracks 1, 3, 9)
- Mae McKenna, Lorenza Johnson, Jackie Challenor – backing vocals (tracks 4, 7)
- Mark Brzezicki – drums (track 7)
- Nigel Ross-Scott – bass guitar (tracks 4, 10)
- Lindsay Elliott – drums (track 4)
- Glenn Gregory – backing vocals (track 6)
- Paul Mosby – mizmar (track 10)

Technical

- Brian Tench – mixing engineer
- Rik Walton – recording engineer
- John Hudson – co-producer (track 12)
- George Hurrell – photography
- Peter Saville Associates – design

== Charts ==
Chart performance for The Gift
Chart (1985)	Peak position
Australian Albums (Kent Music Report)	29
Dutch Albums (Album Top 100)	42
German Albums (Offizielle Top 100)	28
New Zealand Albums (RMNZ)	24
Swedish Albums (Sverigetopplistan)	25
UK Albums (OCC)	2
