= Strasse =

Swedish band

- Origin: Sweden
- Genres: New wave
- Years active: 1980s–2000s

Strasse is a Swedish new wave band formed 1978 in Gothenburg by singer Russ Ryden, drummer Kaj Zack and guitarist Max Abbey.

Their second single "Crash Slowly" was produced by Midge Ure, who thought Strasse was a band ahead of their time.

Strasse released their debut album Följa John in 1981 where they got help with the producing by both Midge Ure and the Swedish artist Magnus Uggla.

In 1983 the group found themselves signed to RCA in the UK and Midge Ure produced their third single "A Stairway to You" in London.

After one more single "Hunger, Hunger", Strasse disbanded and singer Russ Ryden took interest in painting. Guitarist Max Abbey got on tour with Ultravox on their U-Vox European tour 1986.

Strasse reformed in 2001 and their 2005 album Transsylvanian Flower, and 2009 album Half Past Animal was well received by the music critics.

== See also ==
- List of Swedes in music
