= Dear God (Midge Ure song) =

1988 single by Midge Ure

Single by Midge Ure

from the album Answers to Nothing
- B-side: "Music #1"
- Released: 7 November 1988
- Length: 5:00
- Label: Chrysalis
- Songwriter: Midge Ure
- Producers: Midge Ure *Rik Walton

Midge Ure singles chronology
"Answers to Nothing" (1988)	"Dear God" (1988)	"Cold, Cold Heart" (1991)

"Dear God" is a song by Midge Ure as the second single from his album Answers to Nothing. It was his first and only song to reach the US Billboard Hot 100, where it peaked at number 95. Elsewhere, the song also charted in the Netherlands and the UK.

== Background ==
In a 2015 interview with Songfacts, Ure said that he conceived the song soon after waking up, which according to him had "never happened before and it's never happened since." He subsequently rushed over to the recording studio located at the bottom of his garden to get these musical ideas on a 24-track machine.

When determining the song's lyrical content, Ure centered the central theme around the weaponization of religion for acts of violence, saying that he found it both "bizarre" and "obscene" that "staunch radical people will happily kill somebody else because they don't believe in the same God". He further added that the song was "like a child's prayer...It's a question and an explanation at the same time." The song's lyrics contains a plea for a worldwide religion, although Ure said that this was unlikely to be fully realised.

Ure recorded "Dear God" without knowing that XTC had released a song with the same title a few years prior. He only learned of the song's existence in early 1989 after his record company sent him a cassette containing the XTC track. When comparing the two songs, Ure labeled XTC's track as "a bit more cynical than mine, but a similar sort of sentiment, except mine was more questioning and theirs was a bit more sort of a statement." A limited-edition version of the "Dear God" single was released by Chrysalis Records exclusively in the United Kingdom with a white tin and two bonus tracks, which accompanied the 7" and 12" editions of the single that the label also released.

== Critical reception ==
Music & Media described "Dear God" as "quite a serious song with a slightly religious feel" and believed that it was "probably a very good move" to release the song around Christmas. Tom Demalon of AllMusic thought that "Dear God" was Ure's best attempt at assessing the state of the world on his album Answers to Nothing. Writing for the Los Angeles Times, Mike Boehm felt that "Dear God" grew stale after repeated listens and was inferior to "Hymn", a prayer-oriented song co-written by Ure during his time with Ultravox.

== Track listing ==
- 7" single
1. "Dear God" – 4:52
2. "Music #1" – 4:41
- CD Maxi
1. "Dear God" – 8:07
2. "Music #1" – 4:41
3. "Remembrance Day" – 4:25

== Personnel ==
- Midge Ure – vocals, guitars, keyboards
- Robbie Kilgore – additional keyboards
- Steve Brzezicki – bass guitar
- Mark Brzezicki – drums

== Chart performance ==
Chart (1988–1989)	Peak position
Netherlands (Single Top 100)	29
UK Singles (OCC)	55
US Billboard Hot 100	95
US Billboard Mainstream Rock	6
US Billboard Modern Rock Tracks	4
