= Breathe (Midge Ure song) =

1996 single by Midge Ure

Single by Midge Ure

from the album Breathe
- Released: 22 March 1996
- Length: 4:28 (album version); 4:06 (radio version)
- Label: Arista; BMG
- Songwriter: Midge Ure
- Producer: Richard Feldman

Midge Ure singles chronology
"I See Hope (In the Morning Light)" (1991)	"Breathe" (1996)	"Guns and Arrows" (1996)

"Breathe" is a song by Scottish singer Midge Ure, released on 22 March 1996 as the first single from his fourth solo album, Breathe. The song was written by Midge Ure and produced by Richard Feldman. It was made famous by its use in a popular television advertising campaign of the Swatch, two years after its actual publication, which revived its commercial fortunes. The song eventually reached number one in Austria and Italy and entered the top 20 in three other European countries.

== Music videos ==
Three music videos have been recorded for this song. The main music video sees Midge Ure sing the song next to Westbury White Horse. The other two are a first and a second part. The first part shows references to the 1997 Swatch's commercial which featured this song. The second one shows a wedding and was filmed in Budapest.

== Track listing ==
Maxi-CD

1. "Breathe" (radio edit) – 4:06
2. "Breathe" (live) – 3:58

== Charts ==
=== Weekly charts ===
Chart (1996–1998)	Peak position
Austria (Ö3 Austria Top 40)	1
Europe (Eurochart Hot 100)	12
France (SNEP)	24
Germany (GfK)	12
Italy (Musica e dischi)	1
Italy Airplay (Music & Media)	3
Spain (AFYVE)	2
Switzerland (Schweizer Hitparade)	17
UK Singles (OCC)	70

=== Year-end charts ===
Chart (1998)	Position
Austria (Ö3 Austria Top 40)	11
Europe (Eurochart Hot 100)	50
Germany (Media Control)	63

== Release history ==
Region	Date	Format(s)	Label(s)	Ref.
Europe	22 March 1996	CD	Arista; BMG	
United Kingdom	13 May 1996	CD; cassette	Arista; BMG	
