= Steven A. Williams =

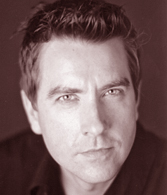

Background information
- Born: Steven Andrew Williams; 1965 (age 60–61); Coventry, West Midlands, England
- Genres: Rock and roll, pop, classical, blues, electronic
- Occupations: Musician, composer and record producer.
- Instruments: Drums, percussion, piano and vocals
- Years active: 1980–present
- Website: stevenawilliams.uk

Steven A. Williams (born 1965) is a British musician, composer, record producer and engineer based in Wimbledon, London.

Williams' contributions to music includes performing on UK top 40 albums such as Midge Ure's Pure, performing and programming on the soundtrack to the film, From Hell and endorsement by several audio companies such as Sony Oxford, Celemony & SE Electronics.

== Career ==
After studying at the Royal Academy of Music, Williams made a name for himself touring with Midge Ure.

Williams has also worked on the soundtrack for the feature films From Hell and Dinotopia.

Other artists Williams has worked with include Lisa Stansfield, T'Paul, Paula Abdul, Tori Amos, Leonard Cohen, The Pretenders and Van Morrison.

In 2004, Williams opened his own facility, The Chapel Studios.
