= Messengers (Scottish band) =

Scottish new wave band

- Origin: Glasgow
- Years active: 1982–1985
- Label: Chrysalis Records
- Members: Daniel Mitchell; Colin King

Messengers were a Scottish new wave duo consisting of Danny Mitchell (keyboards and programming) and Colin King (vocals and percussion). The duo were originally part of Modern Man, a Glasgow post-punk/new wave band discovered by Midge Ure of Ultravox. Modern Man disbanded after releasing one album produced by Ure, Concrete Scheme (1980), after which Ure stayed as producer with Mitchell and King as Messengers.

Messengers toured as support band to Ultravox, contributing to the live album Monument the Soundtrack (1983), and with Mitchell co-writing Midge Ure's "If I Was". Enough material for an album was recorded by 1984, but Ure's label Chrysalis declined to release an album after offering a three singles deal only.

An album was finally released in November 2004 when Mitchell and King re-recorded many of their songs, written during the period of 1979 and 1985, for release via the official Ultravox website. Of the thirteen tracks released on the album, only three were new compositions: "(Did You) Take Me For A Ride", "Send That Letter Home" and "The Reformation Waltz".

== Discography ==
=== Messengers ===
==== Album ====
- "...It's Been Twenty Years, Let's Try Turning Up the Volume...", MESSCD200401, released 10 November 2004

Tracks recorded and mixed at DBS by Father Dan. Vocals recorded at Carlton Studios, Glasgow.

==== Singles ====
All tracks written by Daniel Mitchell/Colin King, except "I Turn In (To You)" and "Plains of Siberia" by Daniel Mitchell and "Andy Warhol" by David Bowie.

- "I Turn In (To You)" / "The Semi-Professionals (Theme No. 1)", 7" single: Chrysalis Records, CHS 2663, released 3 December 1982
- "I Turn In (To You) (Extended Version)" / "The Semi-Professionals (Theme No. 1)", 12" single: Chrysalis Records, CHS 12 2663, released 3 December 1982
- "Great Institutions" / "Here Come the Heroes", 7" single: Musicfest/Chrysalis Records, MUST 1, released 29 June 1984
- "Great Institutions (MF Mix)" / "Here Come the Heroes", "Strawboy (recorded live at Hammersmith Odeon, Dec. 1982)", 12" single: Musicfest/Chrysalis Records, MUSTX 1, released 29 June 1984
- "Frontiers" / "Plains of Siberia", 7" single: Musicfest/Chrysalis Records, MUST 2, released 28 September 1984
- "Frontiers (Extended Version)" / "Plains of Siberia", "Andy Warhol", 12" single: Musicfest/Chrysalis Records, MUST X2, released 28 September 1984

=== Modern Man ===
==== Album ====
- Concrete Scheme, MAM Records, MAMLP 5001, released 7 November 1980

==== Singles ====
All tracks written by Danny Mitchell, except "Things Could Be Better" by Jim Cook.

- "All the Little Idiots" / "Advance", 7″ single: MAM Records, MAMS 204, released 15 August 1980
- "Body Music" / "I Couldn't Stop", 7″ single: MAM Records, MAMS 206, released 24 October 1980
- "Things Could Be Better" / "Wastelands", 7″ single: MAM Records, MAMS 207, released 30 January 1981
- "Things Could Be Better" (12″ mix) / "Wastelands", 12″ single: MAM Records, MAML 207, released 30 January 1981
- "War Drums" / "Tell Us Lies", 7″ single: MAM Records, MAMS 211, released 24 July 1981

Personnel

- Danny Mitchell – guitar and synthesizer
- Jim Cook – lead vocal
- Mike Moran – bass
- Ali McLeod – lead guitar
- Colin King – drums and vocals
- All tracks written by Danny Mitchell
- Produced by Midge Ure
- Engineer - Brian Young
- Recorded at Cava Studios, Glasgow
