= U-Vox =

1986 studio album by Ultravox

Studio album by Ultravox
- Released: October 13, 1986
- Recorded: 1986
- Studios: Conny Plank's studio (Cologne); Hot Food, Music Fest, West Side and AIR (London); Windmill Lane (Dublin)
- Genre: Synth-pop
- Length: 42:49
- Label: Chrysalis
- Producers: Conny Plank; Ultravox

Ultravox chronology
| The Collection (1984) | U-Vox (1986) | Revelation (1993) |

Singles from U-Vox
- 1. "Same Old Story" Released: September 15, 1986; 2. "All Fall Down" Released: November 10, 1986; 3. "All in One Day" Released: June 8, 1987

Professional ratings
Review scores
| Source | Rating |
|---|---|
| AllMusic | 2/5 stars |

U-Vox is the eighth studio album by British new wave band Ultravox, released on October 13, 1986 by Chrysalis Records. It was the band's fifth album during the Midge Ure era, and the final one featuring the band's 1979 lineup, with the exception of Warren Cann, for nearly 26 years. The Ure-era lineup would eventually reform in 2008. It was also the last Ultravox album to reach the top 10 of the UK Albums Chart, peaking at number nine.

== Background ==
Despite reaching the UK top 10, the album was not as successful as the previous Ultravox albums from the 1980s and contained no top-20 singles (with "Same Old Story" and "All Fall Down" reaching numbers 31 and 30, respectively). In addition, drummer Warren Cann was unceremoniously dumped by the band, due to "musical differences", before recording the album. The drums on the album were played by Mark Brzezicki from Big Country. Billy Currie shared in a 1989 interview “We had some problems with the rhythm section, and we wound up kicking out our drummer, Warren Cann. Poor old Warren, but there’s always someone to take the crap when things start getting bad, and Warren took the crap.” On Big Country’s Mark Brzezicki Currie said, “The problem is that Mark was too good. Because he’s so amazing, he stamped a non-Ultravox thing onto the album, and it ended up not sounding like us.”

The sound developed the movement away from electronic rock started by Lament further and some unusual instrumentation was used, such as the Celtic sound of "All Fall Down" with instrumentation by The Chieftains. Brass on the lead single "Same Old Story" by Beggar and Co. The album's final track, "All in One Day", with an orchestral arrangement by George Martin was written about the Live Aid event.

EMI Gold remastered and reissued U-Vox on CD on 2 October 2000, with bonus tracks, alongside the other re-releases of the Ultravox catalogue. A remastered two-disc version was issued in 2009, which featured the original nine-track album on CD one and several B-sides, mixes and demos on CD two.

Ure said in his autobiography about the album: "We should have called it U-Bend because it should have gone down the drain. It deserved to. It was an album that should never have been. During the recording of the album we were headless chickens, and our song ideas were splintered."

On the European U-Vox Tour, that started 23 October in Gdansk, Ultravox toured as a seven-piece band, featuring Craig Armstrong on keyboards, Max Abbey from Swedish band Strasse on guitar, session drummer Pat Ahern (who played on Howard Devotos solo album Jerky Versions of the Dream) and Colin King, from Messengers on backing vocals.

U-Vox was the last Ultravox album with Midge Ure before the band split after the tour. Future incarnations of the band in the 1990s would feature keyboardist Billy Currie as the lone original member, though the classic line-up of the band (including Cann and Ure) would reconvene in 2008 for a tour and recorded a new album, Brilliant, which was released in 2012.

Stemming from the lack of success for Lament in America, U-Vox was not released by Chrysalis in the United States.

== Track listing ==
All songs written by Chris Cross, Billy Currie and Midge Ure.

1. "Same Old Story" – 4:38
2. "Sweet Surrender" – 4:34
3. "Dream On" – 4:47
4. "The Prize" – 5:37
5. "All Fall Down" – 5:09
6. "Time to Kill" – 4:26
7. "Moon Madness" – 3:28
8. "Follow Your Heart" – 4:53
9. "All in One Day" – 5:09

Bonus tracks on 2 October 2000 CD re-release (525 6112):

10. "3" (B-side of Same Old Story) – 4:01
11. "All in One Day (Instrumental)" (B-side extra of Same Old Story (12" version)) – 6:12
12. "Dreams?" (B-side of All Fall Down) – 2:32
13. "All Fall Down (Instrumental)" (B-side extra of All Fall Down (12" version)) – 5:34
14. "Stateless" (B-side of All in One Day) – 2:51

Tracks on CD 2 of the 7 September 2009 Remastered Definitive Edition (CDLX 1459):

1. "Same Old Story (Extended Version)" – 7:00
2. "3" – 4:01
3. "All In One Day (Instrumental)" – 6:13
4. "All Fall Down (Extended Version)" – 7:41
5. "Dreams?" – 2:31
6. "All Fall Down (Instrumental)" – 5:36
7. "Dream On (Recorded Live At Wembley Arena, 06 Nov 1986)" – 3:50
8. "The Prize (Recorded Live At Wembley Arena, 06 Nov 1986)" – 4:58
9. "All Fall Down (Recorded Live At Wembley Arena, 06 Nov 1986)" – 5:41
10. "Stateless" – 2:52
11. "Same Old Story (Recorded Live At Glasgow Barrowlands, 01 Nov 1986)" – 4:32
12. "Sweet Surrender (Recorded Live At Glasgow Barrowlands, 01 Nov 1986)" – 3:02
13. "All In One Day (Recorded Live At Glasgow Barrowlands, 01 Nov 1986)" – 6:46
14. "Time To Kill (Recorded Live At Glasgow Barrowlands, 01 Nov 1986)" – 2:53
15. "All In One Day (Work In Progress Mix)" – 6:31

== Personnel ==
Ultravox

- Chris Cross – bass, synthesizer, backing vocals
- Billy Currie – keyboards, violin, synthesizer
- Midge Ure – guitar, lead vocals

Guest musicians

- Mark Brzezicki – drums
- Beggar & Co Horns – brass on "Same Old Story"
- Carol Kenyon – backing vocals on "Same Old Story" and "The Prize"
- Kevin Powell – bass on "Sweet Surrender"
- Derek Watkins, Gary Barnacle, John Thirkell, Pete Thoms – brass on "The Prize"
- The Chieftains – featured on "All Fall Down"
- George Martin – arranger and conductor on "All in One Day"

== Charts ==
Chart performance for U-Vox
| Chart (1986) | Peak position |
|---|---|
| Australian Albums (Kent Music Report) | 92 |
| European Albums (Music & Media) | 47 |
| German Albums (Offizielle Top 100) | 49 |
| Swedish Albums (Sverigetopplistan) | 16 |
| Swiss Albums (Schweizer Hitparade) | 29 |
| UK Albums (Official Charts) | 9 |

== Certifications ==
Certifications for U-Vox
| Region | Certification | Certified units/sales |
|---|---|---|
| United Kingdom (BPI) | Gold | 100,000^{^} |
^{^} Shipments figures based on certification alone.
