= Fragile (Midge Ure album) =

Studio album by Midge Ure
- Released: 7 July 2014
- Studios: Environment Studio, Bath
- Label: Hypertension
- Producer: Midge Ure

Midge Ure chronology
Move Me (2000)	Fragile (2014)	Orchestrated (2017)

Singles from Fragile
- 1. "Become" Released: 14 July 2014; 2. "I Survived" Released: 10 November 2014; 3. "Dark Dark Night" Released: 2 March 2015

Fragile, released on 7 July 2014 by German label Hypertension, is the sixth solo album by former Ultravox frontman Midge Ure.

== Background ==
Ure produced and recorded the album at his home. It was his first solo album with original material since Move Me (2000). All tracks are written by Ure, except "Let It Rise" which was co-written with the German artist/composer Schiller. "Let It Rise" is a reworked version from the earlier Schiller-version from the album Atemlos released 2010. The other track is “Dark Dark Night,” which is a collaboration with Moby.

Though he never completely stopped working on his music during the intervening years, Ure had been questioning whether he wanted to be part of the radically changed industry. Reuniting with Ultravox inspired him to focus on music again, and ultimately finish the material that would become ‘Fragile.’

The title track on the album, "Fragile" is a firsthand look at how an alcoholic thinks. Ure had gotten sober after spending the previous 12 years or so dealing with alcoholism when he wrote the song. Ure said: "We all have a breaking point, and my breaking point proved that I was as fragile as anyone else."

Ure said 2014 about the album:

'Fragile' is probably the most brutally honest thing that I've ever written. It deals with the demons that I've dealt with over the last ten years, which is the gap between the last solo album and the new solo album. "Wearing my heart on my sleeve" is probably the term to use on this album. It's the kind of work you can only do after a lifetime making music.

== Track listing ==
All tracks composed by Midge Ure; except where indicated

No.	Title	Writer(s)	Length
1.	"I Survived"		5:01
2.	"Are We Connected"		4:52
3.	"Let It Rise"	Ure, Christopher von Deylen	4:23
4.	"Become"		4:01
5.	"Star Crossed"		5:26
6.	"Wire and Wood" (Instrumental)		7:09
7.	"Dark, Dark Night"	Ure, Richard M. Hall	6:00
8.	"For All You Know"		5:40
9.	"Bridges" (Instrumental)		4:41
10.	"Fragile"		6:13

== Personnel ==
- Played/Produced/Mixed by Midge Ure
- Programming and Keyboards (Track 7) - Moby
- Drum Samples (Track 1) - Russell Field
