= Answers to Nothing =

Studio album by Midge Ure
- Released: 30 August 1988
- Genre: Pop
- Label: Chrysalis
- Producer: Midge Ure; Rik Walton

Midge Ure chronology
The Gift (1985)	Answers to Nothing (1988)	Pure (1991)

Singles from Answers to Nothing
- 1. "Answers to Nothing" Released: 8 August 1988; 2. "Dear God" Released: 7 November 1988

Professional ratings
Review scores
Source	Rating
AllMusic	3.5/5 stars

Answers to Nothing is the second solo studio album by the Scottish musician Midge Ure, released on 30 August 1988 by Chrysalis Records. It was the first release by Ure following the demise of Ultravox.

Ure wrote, produced and recorded all the songs over the span of ten months in his 24-track home studio. As a solo artist, Ure only hit the singles chart once in America with the single "Dear God". It reached No. 95 on the Billboard Hot 100, No. 6 on the US Billboard Mainstream Rock chart and at No. 4 on the US Billboard Alternative Music chart in 1989.

== Background ==
The track "Sister and Brother" was a duet with Kate Bush. In 1982, Ure had appeared onstage with Kate Bush while she performed live onstage during the Prince's Trust Rock Gala. After Ure's approach, Bush said she would send a vocal contribution back if she had time. Ure did not anticipate that Bush would complete her vocals in a timely manner, although Bush invited him to her recording studio a week later to listen to her vocal overdubs. Having turned her vocals around so quickly, Ure was ready for Bush's contribution to be two or three lines, namely her sister character answering the brother's questions. Instead, Bush had multi-tracked the vocals with effects Ure called: "all these wonderful Kateisms", including a choral section at the end of the song. "It was glorious. My only regret is that I didn’t see Kate at work to see how she’d done it. Hearing someone like Kate Bush pour their heart and soul into one of my songs was an incredible affirmation. I was shocked she’d taken so much time and effort."

"Homeland" was written about Phil Lynott, who had died two years prior to when the album was released. Ure said in an interview 2015 about Dear God:

In a way, it's a double-edged sword that song. It's like a child's prayer: "Dear God, is there somebody out there?" And in another way, it's absolute despondent despair, saying, "Dear God, is there somebody out there?" It's a question and an explanation at the same time.

Ure was pleased with the creative control he attained during the making of Answers to Nothing, and thus labeled it as his "first genuine solo album"

== Track listing ==
All tracks are written by Midge Ure except where noted.

No.	Title	Length
1.	"Answers to Nothing"	4:34
2.	"Take Me Home"	3:05
3.	"Sister and Brother"	5:55
4.	"Dear God"	5:00
5.	"The Leaving (So Long)"	4:16
6.	"Just for You"	4:39
7.	"Hell to Heaven"	4:04
8.	"Lied"	4:52
9.	"Homeland"	4:41
10.	"Remembrance Day" (Ure, Danny Mitchell)	4:38

Bonus tracks for 1998 UK re-release
No.	Title	Length
11.	"Honorare"	3:14
12.	"Oboe"	4:02
13.	"Music # 1"	4:39
14.	"Sister and Brother" (Unreleased Single Edit)	4:12

== Personnel ==
- Midge Ure – guitars, keyboards, vocals
- Mark King – bass on "Answers to Nothing", "Sister and Brother" and "Just for You"
- Steve Brzezicki – bass on "Take Me Home", "Dear God" and "Lied"
- Mark Brzezicki – drums on "Answers to Nothing", "Dear God", "Just for You", and "Remembrance Day"
- Mick Karn – bass on "Remembrance Day"
- Kate Bush – vocals on "Sister and Brother"
- Robbie Kilgore – additional keyboards
- Craig Armstrong – piano on "Sister and Brother"
- Ali Campbell, Robin Campbell, Yona Dunsford, Carol Douet – backing vocals on "Sister and Brother"
- Peter Saville Associates – design
