= Move Me (Midge Ure album) =

Studio album by Midge Ure
- Released: 25 September 2000 (Europe); 2 July 2001 (UK)
- Studio: Environment Studio, Bath; Matrix Studios, London
- Label: BMG, Arista, Curb Records
- Producer: Midge Ure

Midge Ure chronology
Breathe (1996)	Move Me (2000)	Fragile (2014)

Singles from Move Me
- 1. "You Move Me" Released: 14 August 2000; 2. "Beneath A Spielberg Sky" Released: 18 June 2001

Move Me, released in continental Europe on 25 September 2000 by BMG Records, is the fifth solo album by former Ultravox frontman Midge Ure. Ure produced, arranged and recorded it almost entirely at home. The UK version of the album had a 'soft release' on 14 May 2001 by Curb Records, with only 1,000 copies being made available country-wide. The album received a 'proper release' on 2 July 2001. In the United States, Koch Records handled the album's distribution.

== Background ==
Ure described Move Me as a more guitar-oriented album than some of the previous releases in his discography. "Beneath A Spielberg Sky" was released as the first single from the album. Ure commented that the song was about "all things in life viewed on a screen like a movie. War, love, past and future."

"The Refugee Song" was inspired by the refugee crisis in Kosovo 1999. Midge said that the song "refers to the whole idea of losing your family for a bit, not knowing whether they are alive or dead?" "The Refugee Song" was re-recorded 2015 and was included as a bonus track on the "Breathe Again Live and Extended" album.

Move Me was re-released on 16 October 2006 by the German record label Hypertension, as "Move Me+" with a bonus CD featuring two instrumental tracks called "Higher" and "Fall", plus live tracks recorded in Germany 2000, radio edits and acoustic versions.

== Track listing ==
All tracks written by Midge Ure; except where indicated

No.	Title	Writer(s)	Length
1.	"You Move Me"		5:37
2.	"Beneath A Spielberg Sky"		4:53
3.	"Words"		3:44
4.	"Strong"		4:45
5.	"Let Me Go"		4:54
6.	"Alone"		5:11
7.	"Monster" (Instrumental)		3:04
8.	"Absolution Sometime!"	Ure, Danny Mitchell	4:59
9.	"The Refugee Song"	Ure, Danny Mitchell	5:19
10.	"Four"		4:47
11.	"Somebody"		5:50

== Personnel ==
- Midge Ure - Vocals, guitar, keyboards
- Bass – Dave Williamson
- Percussion – Russell Field
- Hammond Organ, Piano – Josh Phillips (tracks: 2, 4, 5)
- Backing Vocals – Angie Brown, Billie Godfrey, Mary Pearce (tracks: 2, 11)
- Keyboards, Piano – Martin Badder (tracks: 6, 7, 10)
- Bass Synthesizer – Bruno Ellingham (track: 7)
