= If I Was =

1985 single by Midge Ure

Single by Midge Ure

from the album The Gift
- B-side: "Piano"; "The Man Who Sold the World"
- Released: 2 September 1985
- Studio: Music Fest (London)
- Genre: Synth-rock; new wave
- Length: 5:20 (album version); 4:46 (single version)
- Label: Chrysalis
- Songwriters: Danny Mitchell; Midge Ure
- Producer: Midge Ure

Midge Ure singles chronology
"After a Fashion" (1983)	"If I Was" (1985)	"That Certain Smile" (1985)

Music video
- Midge Ure - If I Was (Official Music Video) on YouTube

"If I Was" is a song by the Scottish musician Midge Ure. It was co-written by Ure and Danny Mitchell (of Ultravox's tour opening band Messengers) and released as the first single from Ure's debut solo studio album, The Gift (1985). The song reached No. 1 on the UK Singles Chart for one week in October 1985.

The track also reached number one in Ireland and peaked within the top 20 in eight other countries.

== Background ==
Around the time that work commenced on The Gift, Ure had hosted Danny Mitchell and Colin King of Messengers at his house after he had engineered one of their sessions in Glasgow. After they had departed, Ure was sifting through tapes for potential material to record when he found a demo that Mitchell had left behind. Ure then reworked the song and invited Mark King of Level 42 to play bass guitar on the song, having met each other in Swansea Top Rank for a Radio One road show event. According to Ure, King "ended up playing the most simplistic bassline you could think of – it was incredibly basic for him. He showed great restraint by not slapping all over it."

Ure selected "If I Was" to be the first single from The Gift, believing that it was a "good pop song" that would "immediately establish the solo album as different from Ultravox. It was either that or releasing one of the instrumental tracks." "If I Was" later peaked at number one in the UK and Ireland.

== Music video ==
The music video featured Ure's face and body patterns on a Pin Art pinscreen.

== B-sides ==
The instrumental "Piano" was released on the B-side of the 7-inch and 12-inch singles. The 12-inch single includes a second track: a cover version of David Bowie's "The Man Who Sold the World", an earlier version of which was originally released on the film soundtrack of Party Party on 3 December 1982. Both songs were added as bonus tracks to the CD reissue of The Gift in 1996.

== Charts ==
=== Weekly charts ===
Chart (1985–1986)	Peak position
Australia (Kent Music Report)	10
Austria (Ö3 Austria Top 40)	6
Belgium (Ultratop 50 Flanders)	9
Canada (The Record)	12
Canada Top Singles (RPM)	13
Canada Adult Contemporary (RPM)	8
Europe (European Top 100 Singles)	9
Ireland (IRMA)	1
Netherlands (Dutch Top 40)	16
Netherlands (Single Top 100)	12
New Zealand (Recorded Music NZ)	8
Switzerland (Schweizer Hitparade)	16
UK Singles (Official Charts)	1
West Germany (GfK)	2

=== Year-end charts ===
Chart (1985)	Position
UK Singles (OCC)	27

== Certifications ==
Region	Certification	Certified units/sales
United Kingdom (BPI)	Silver	250,000^{^}
^{^} Shipments figures based on certification alone.
