= Steve Brzezicki =

British musician

Steve Brzezicki is a British session bass guitarist and younger brother of drummer Mark Brzezicki with whom he often forms a rhythm section as "The Brzezicki Brothers". Among others, he and Mark worked together on Midge Ure's solo albums Answers to Nothing (1988) and Pure (1991), and Nik Kershaw's album Radio Musicola (1986). They also played live with ex-Marillion singer Fish on his first solo tour in 1989/1990 and Procol Harum in 2000.

Steve also features on Scatman John's debut album, Scatman's World (1995). Between 1999 and 2003, he and Mark played in Damon Hill's band, "The Conrods".
