= Pure (Midge Ure album) =

Studio album by Midge Ure
- Released: 16 September 1991
- Genre: Pop
- Label: Arista Records
- Producer: Midge Ure

Midge Ure chronology
| Answers to Nothing (1988) | Pure (1991) | Breathe (1996) |

Singles from Pure
- 1. "Cold, Cold Heart" Released: 5 August 1991; 2. "I See Hope in the Morning Light" Released: 21 October 1991; 3. "Let It Go?" Released: 16 April 1992

Pure, released on 16 September 1991, is the third solo album by former Ultravox frontman Midge Ure. It was the first release by Ure with a new record label BMG-Arista. The album reached No. 36 on the UK Albums Chart. "Cold, Cold Heart", "I See Hope in the Morning Light" and "Let It Go?" were released as singles from the album.

== Background ==
Ure spent two years assembling the material for Pure, both at his home studio in London and in the basement in his house on the Caribbean island of Montserrat, once he cleared away the damage wrought by the passing of Hurricane Hugo. Ure commented that the album's central theme related to "the highs and lows of love". He wrote "Let It Go?" about people who assume that others will take initiative on any given task, saying that the song's lyrics revolved around "the sheer apathy of thinking 'Oh well', somebody else will sort it out."

The album opens with "I See Hope in the Morning Light", a mixture of African rhythms and a gospel choir coupled with Uilliean pipes played by Paddy Moloney.

With "I See Hope", I liked the idea of the choir, something that was kind of inspirational but not about religion or God. I wanted that kind of rousing tingle-up-the-spine feel that you get from inspirational songs, but inspirational about life rather than afterlife. The idea of getting through difficult periods in your life and coming out the other end, feeling slightly elated.

== Track listing ==
All tracks are written by Midge Ure except where noted.

| No. | Title | Length |
|---|---|---|
| 1. | "I See Hope In The Morning Light" (Ure, Danny Mitchell) | 5:42 |
| 2. | "Cold, Cold Heart" | 4:30 |
| 3. | "Pure Love" | 3:43 |
| 4. | "Sweet 'n' Sensitive Thing" | 3:56 |
| 5. | "Let It Go?" | 6:22 |
| 6. | "Rising" (Ure, Mitchell, Katherine Stephenson) | 5:25 |
| 7. | "Light In Your Eyes" | 3:31 |
| 8. | "Little One" (Ure, Danny Mitchell) | 5:00 |
| 9. | "Hands Around My Heart" | 4:30 |
| 10. | "Waiting Days" (Ure, Mitchell, Katherine Stephenson) | 4:32 |
| 11. | "Tumbling Down" | 2:49 |

== Personnel ==
- Midge Ure – vocals, guitars, keyboards
- Bass – Jeremy Meehan (tracks: 1, 3, 4, 6 to 10), Steve Brzezicki (tracks: 1, 2, 5, 10, 11)
- Drums – Mark Brzezicki (tracks: 1, 3, 7 to 9, 11), Simon Phillips (tracks: 5, 6, 10)
- Keyboards – Robbie Kilgore (tracks: 1, 3, 6 to 11)
- Percussion – Steve Williams (tracks: 4, 7, 8)
- Uilleann pipes and Tin Whistle - Paddy Moloney (track 1)
- Background vocals (track 1) - Chris Ballin, Gwen Dupree, Michael McCloud, Phil Gannon, Ricci P. Washington, Sheylah Cuffy, Sylvia Mason-James, Vicki St James
- Background vocals (track 5) - Angie Brown, Jackie Sheridan, Kate Stephenson, Sheylah Cuffy
- Background vocals (track 10) - Jackie Sheridan, Kate Stephenson
- Co-producer and engineer – Rik Walton
- Design, Illustration – Una Fagan
