= Breathe (Midge Ure album) =

Studio album by Midge Ure
- Released: March 1996 (Europe); 20 May 1996 (UK)
- Label: BMG
- Producer: Richard Feldman

Midge Ure chronology
Pure (1991)	Breathe (1996)	Move Me (2000)

Singles from Breathe
- 1. "Breathe" Released: 22 March 1996 (Europe) 13 May 1996 (UK); 2. "Guns and Arrows" Released: 4 November 1996; 3. "Fields of Fire" Released: 4 May 1998 (Europe)

Breathe, a 1996 album by Midge Ure, was the fourth solo release for the former Ultravox frontman. The album, produced by Richard Feldman, was released first in Continental Europe, followed by the U.K. and U.S.

== Background ==
The recording of 'Breathe' was completed in early 1995, but the album's release was delayed by the record company. The recording took place in various studios in Los Angeles, San Francisco, Dublin and in Ure's own studio in Bath. Ure first recorded four of the tracks with producer Julian Mendelsohn, but they were later re-recorded.

In 1998, the single "Breathe" became a hit-single in several European countries, boosted by its use in a Swatch TV advert campaign, two years after its original release. The single charted at No.1 both at the Italian and the Austrian charts, No.10 in Spain and No.12 in Germany. "Guns And Arrows" and "Fields Of Fire" were also released as singles.

Influenced by his Scottish heritage, the album 'Breathe' features a unique blend of traditional instruments, such as the uilleann pipes and bodhrán, combined with the exotic sounds of the didgeridoo and Gaelic vocals. The result is a musical landscape that pulses with organic vibrancy.

Ure called "Breathe":

"More of a Midge Ure album than any other album I´ve done." "In a way", he adds, "Breathe is a much more honest and open record".

Ure traces the origins of "Breathe" to a U.S. Tour he did with other songwriters in 1992. Once the other songwriters convinced him to try playing "Vienna" on acoustic guitar, Ure realized he could make music without the wealth of electronics or other musicians backing him up."That turned my whole perception of what I was doing musically".

Ure said about the album in 2015:

"It was just another phase of discovery. To me, the important part of it was the quality of the songs, not just necessarily the instruments enhancing the songs." "You try to run a million miles from what you’re known for and it’s all part of the process of finding your own feet and trying to decide what you are and what you want to do. Part of that process would have been turning my back on the standard synthesis and rediscover my Scottish roots."

The song "Live Forever" was inspired by Anne Rice book "Interview with the Vampire".

Ure said in 2015:

" ‘Breathe’ was one of those albums where the record company, in their infinite wisdom, decided to A&R me after all these years! They wanted me to not use the same musicians, not to record in the same studios, not to produce the album myself… so they asked me to gather a whole bunch of songs which I did and I ended up with a producer I could work with, Richard Feldman who had done an album for the model and actress Milla Jovovich which was a great album. So I made ‘Breathe’, it was fantastic and I delivered the album, only to have it sit on a shelf for a year while BMG started sorting out their internal problems. It was a hideously frustrating process to go through, and when it finally came out, the first two years of its life, it was the worst selling record I’d ever made. So until Swatch came along and picked up the title track thanks to a fan in Italy, the album was an absolute disaster. But because of a TV commercial, it turned the entire thing round. It bounced all around Europe and was a big record eventually."

== Track listing ==
No.	Title	Writer(s)	Length
1.	"Breathe"	Ure	4:28
2.	"Fields Of Fire"	Ure, Feldman	4:31
3.	"Fallen Angel"	Ure, Feldman, Eric Bazilian	3:53
4.	"Free"	Ure, Feldman, Klein	4:42
5.	"Guns And Arrows"	Ure	4:44
6.	"Lay My Body Down"	Ure, Feldman	3:58
7.	"Sinnerman"	Ure, Danny Mitchell	3:38
8.	"Live Forever"	Ure, Feldman, Shipley	4:20
9.	"Trail Of Tears"	Ure, Mitchell	3:38
10.	"May Your Good Lord"	Ure	4:04
11.	"The Maker"	Ure	4:45

== Personnel ==
- Midge Ure - Vocals, acoustic guitar
- Soundcape Guitar (on tracks 5 and 11) – Robert Fripp
- Double Violin, Vocals (on track 8) – L.Shankar
- Mandolin, Melodica – Eric Bazilian
- Vocals (on track 5) – Sally Dworsky
- Uilleann Bagpipes – Paddy Moloney
- Backing Vocals – Jackie Sheridan, Kate Stephenson, Monalisa Young, Matthew Hager, Maxaynne Lewis
- Gaelic Vocals, Backing Vocals – Eleanor McEvoy
- Fiddle – Frank Gallagher
- Hurdy Gurdy, Harmonium – Ethan James
- Accordion – Frank McNamara, Pat Crowley
- Bodhrán, Didgeridoo, Vocals [Celtic] – Liam O'Maonlai
- Guitar – Dean Parks
- Bass Guitar – Larry Klein, Jeremy Meehan
- Drums – David Palmer, Andy Kravitz
- Cello – Ofra Harnoy
- Celtic Harp – Noreen O'Donoghue
- Percussion - Mike Fisher, Iki Levy
- Programming, Keyboards, Percussion – Richard Feldman
- Keyboards - Charles Judge, Jamie Muhulrick
