= Midge Ure =

Scottish musician (born 1953)

Midge Ure OBE
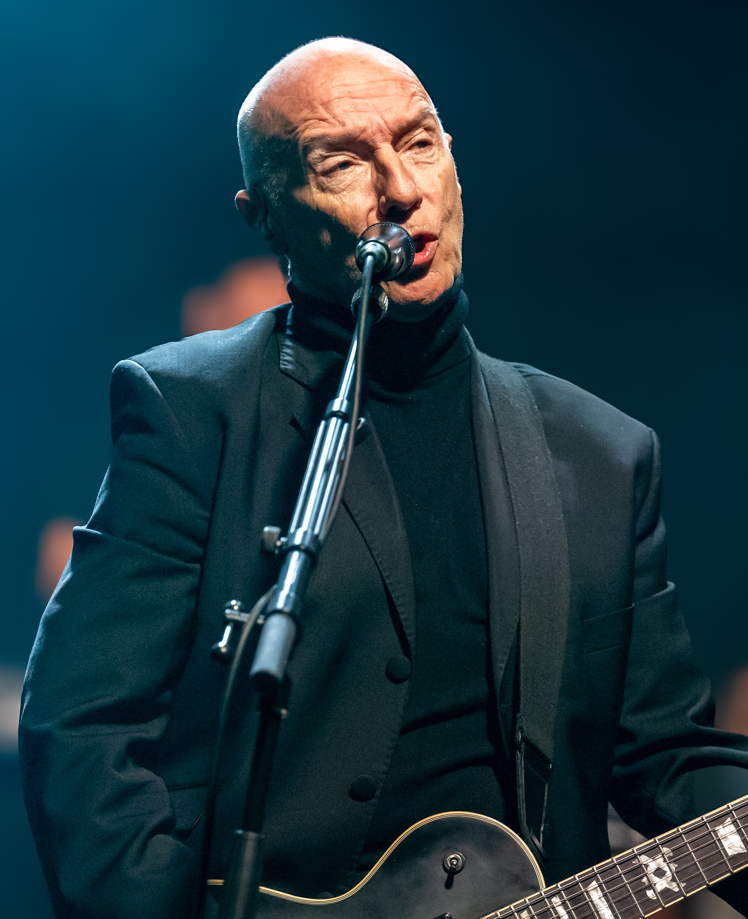
- Ure in 2025

Background information
- Born: James Ure; 10 October 1953 (age 73); Cambuslang, Lanarkshire, Scotland
- Genres: New wave; synth-pop; post-punk; art rock; hard rock
- Occupations: Musician; singer-songwriter; record producer
- Instruments: Vocals; guitar; keyboards; synthesizer
- Years active: 1969–present
- Formerly of: Ultravox; Visage; Slik; Rich Kids; Thin Lizzy
- Website: midgeure.com

James Ure OBE (/jʊər/; born 10 October 1953) is a Scottish singer-songwriter and record producer. His stage name, Midge, is a phonetic reversal of Jim. Ure enjoyed particular success in the 1970s and 1980s in bands including Slik, Thin Lizzy, Rich Kids, Visage, and as the second bandleader of Ultravox after John Foxx had left, carrying the band into high chart positions for the six following years before disbanding it. In 1984, he co-wrote and produced the charity single "Do They Know It's Christmas?" for the supergroup Band Aid, which he organised with Bob Geldof. He acts as a trustee for the charity. The single sold 3.7 million copies in the UK at first release, has become a staple of Christmas song compilations ever since, and is the second-highest-selling single in UK chart history. He also organised the events Live Aid and Live 8 with Geldof, and serves as an ambassador for Save the Children.

Ure is the producer and writer of several synth-pop and new wave hit singles of the 1980s, including "Fade to Grey" (1980) by Visage and the Ultravox signature songs "Vienna" (1980), "Hymn" (1983) and "Dancing with Tears in My Eyes" (1984). He achieved his first UK top 10 solo hit in 1982 with "No Regrets". In 1985, his solo debut studio album The Gift reached number two in the UK Albums Chart and yielded the UK singles chart number-one single "If I Was". He also co-wrote Phil Lynott's "Yellow Pearl", which served as the theme of Top of the Pops for much of the 1980s.

== Early life ==
Born to a working-class family in Cambuslang (on the outskirts of Glasgow), Ure attended Rutherglen Academy until he was 15 years old. For the first 10 years of his life he lived in a one-bedroom tenement flat in Cambuslang with his brother, sister and parents, later moving to a new house in nearby Eastfield.

After leaving school, Ure attended Motherwell Technical College and then began to work as an engineer, training at the National Engineering Laboratory (NEL) in nearby East Kilbride. He started playing music in a Glasgow band called Stumble (c. 1969 – c. 1971).

== Career ==
=== Slik (1972–1977) ===
Ure joined Salvation as a guitarist in 1972. The band had been formed in Glasgow in June 1970 by the brothers Kevin (vocals) and Jim McGinlay (bass guitar). McGinlay decided to turn Ure's name backwards to "Mij" (Midge, as a good-natured mocking hint to Ure's diminutive stature) to avoid any confusion caused by two members of the band having the same first name. Ure has since presented himself in the music scene as Midge Ure. The band performed covers as house band in the Glasgow and Edinburgh Clouds discothèques. The band also comprised Billy McIsaac on keyboards and Kenny Hyslop on drums.

In April 1974, Kevin McGinlay left to pursue a solo career, so Ure assumed vocals in addition to his guitar duties. In November 1974, the band changed its name to Slik, with Bay City Rollers writers Bill Martin and Phil Coulter providing songs. In 1975 Ure turned down an offer to join the Sex Pistols, stating that he felt at the time that Malcolm McLaren had "his priorities completely wrong!", a position he later reversed.

Slik achieved a number one single on the UK singles chart in February 1976 with "Forever and Ever". In early 1977, Jim McGinlay decided to quit the band, being replaced by Russell Webb. Slik terminated their contract with Martin and Coulter, believing that their boy band image was hindering their chances of success during the rising punk rock scene. They changed their name to PVC2 and adopted a more punkish style. Ure's only release with the band under this name was the single "Put You in the Picture".

=== Rich Kids (1977) ===
By October 1977, Ure had left PVC2 to join former Sex Pistol bass guitarist Glen Matlock in Rich Kids. He moved to London and soon found himself immersed in a scene he had previously only read about in the pages of the NME. Musical tensions within the band led to Ure's departure. Having acquired a Yamaha CS50 synthesiser, Ure—alongside bandmate Rusty Egan—wanted to integrate the new instrument into the band's sound. With Glen Matlock and Steve New preferring to remain with the traditional guitars and drums approach, the band broke up.

In January 2010, Rich Kids reformed, for one night only, for a benefit concert for former Rich Kids guitarist Steve New, going then by the name Stella Nova, who was fighting terminal cancer (and who died on 24 May 2010). Although it had been over 30 years since they played together, the press reports praised the gig, which included energetic performances of "Ghosts of Princes in Towers" and "Hung on You". Rich Kids were joined onstage by Mick Jones of the Clash and Gary Kemp of Spandau Ballet. Ure also played an acoustic set of Ultravox and Visage songs.

In February 2016, it was announced that Rich Kids would reform for a joint headline show with the Professionals at London's O2 Shepherd's Bush Empire. The show was later rescheduled (due to building work at the Empire) to the O2 Islington Academy on Thu 23 June 2016, and went ahead as rescheduled, with Ure singing and playing guitar.

=== Visage (1978–1979) ===
In 1978, Egan and Ure formed Visage with lead vocalist Steve Strange, and utilised their new synthesiser when they recorded a cover of the Zager and Evans classic "In the Year 2525" for promotional purposes. The line-up was expanded in 1979 with the addition of Magazine members Dave Formula, John McGeoch and Barry Adamson, and Ultravox keyboardist Billy Currie, and the band signed briefly to Radar Records for the release of their first single "Tar" in November 1979. The single failed to chart, but the band managed to secure a deal with Polydor Records, the following year. In November 1980 their second single, "Fade to Grey", became a hit-single (making the top ten in the UK and topping the chart in several other countries), and was quickly followed by the release of their self-titled debut album which was also a chart success.

In 1982 the second album "The Anvil" went silver in the UK and reached number 6 in the album chart, although the album spawned two further hit singles ("The Damned Don't Cry" and "Night Train"), tensions within the band members were beginning to threaten its musical future. Ure left Visage shortly after the second album was released, citing creative differences with frontman Steve Strange.

Ure already knew Thin Lizzy singer Phil Lynott, and in early 1979 Ure received co-writing credit for "Get Out of Here" on Thin Lizzy's ninth studio album Black Rose (1979). In July 1979 Ure stepped in to help Thin Lizzy complete a US tour following guitarist Gary Moore's abrupt departure. Ure also contributed guitar parts to "Things Ain't Working Out" and "Dublin" for the Thin Lizzy remix compilation album The Continuing Saga of the Ageing Orphans (1979). Thin Lizzy then toured America and Japan. In 1980, during the second part of this tour, Ure switched to keyboards, and was replaced by Dave Flett and then Snowy White as guitarist. At the end of the tour Ure left Thin Lizzy and returned to his primary interest at that time, Ultravox. Ure continued to collaborate with Lynott, co-writing Lynott's biggest solo hit, "Yellow Pearl", and produced the track "Together" on The Philip Lynott Album.

=== Ultravox (1979–1986) ===
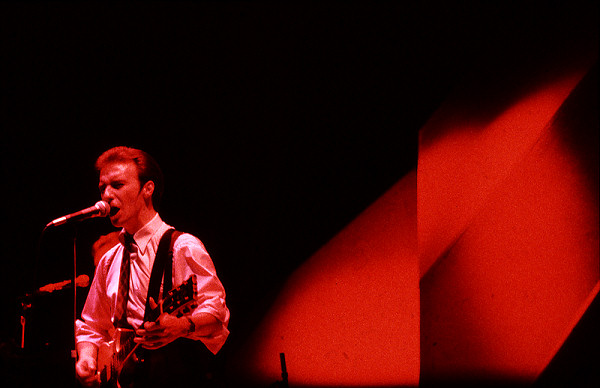
Ure performing with Ultravox in Oslo, Norway, 1981

In 1979, Ure and Billy Currie formed a close bond playing together in Visage. Rusty Egan persuaded Billy Currie to ask Ure if he was interested in joining a revived Ultravox. Ultravox had been presumed defunct since guitarist Robin Simon quit and lead vocalist John Foxx had left to pursue a solo career. In April 1979 Ure regrouped the band and assumed duties as singer, songwriter, guitarist and second keyboardist. This second incarnation would become the classic line-up, with Currie (keyboards, violin), Chris Cross (bass) and Warren Cann (electronic drums). Although Ure had spent the latter half of 1979 on tour with Thin Lizzy, Ultravox found time late in the year to tour in the US. During this time the band wrote a number of songs which were included on their first studio album with Ure.

The album, Vienna, was released in July 1980. Although it was the band's fourth studio album, it was the first with Ure, and the first one to chart, although it was only a minor success on first release. However, when the title track "Vienna" was released as a single in January 1981 it became a huge hit and spent four weeks at no. 2 in the UK singles chart and was the 5th highest selling single in the UK that year. The album itself re-entered the album chart and peaked at no. 3. Inspired by the film noir The Third Man (1949), the music video for "Vienna" was directed by Russell Mulcahy utilising cinematic techniques, and became quite influential. In an interview Ure recalled the way that "music video changed after that. All these things that became video clichés—cropping the top and bottom off the screen, shooting on film as opposed to videotape, making it look like a movie ... we were quite a groundbreaking act for a while." The same year that Ultravox released the Vienna album, Visage also released their self-titled debut studio album which made the UK Top 20 and featured the hit single "Fade to Grey" (co-written by Ure and Currie with Chris Payne), also influential in the direction of the New Romantic electropop music scene. For a while between 1979 and 1980, then, Ure was deeply committed to three different bands, all of them quite successful: Ultravox, Visage and Thin Lizzy.

In September 1981, Ultravox released their second studio album with Ure as frontman, Rage in Eden, which was a Top 5 hit in the UK. This period saw Ure also work as a producer for other artists, amongst them Steve Harley, Peter Godwin, and Strasse. In 1982 Ure had left Visage, and Ultravox released their third studio album with Ure, Quartet, in October 1982, with production by Beatles producer George Martin. The album became their third Top 10 hit and featured four Top 20 singles. After the live album Monument released in October 1983, Ultravox released their fourth studio album with Ure, Lament, in April 1984. The album was another Top 10 success and contained the Top 3 hit "Dancing with Tears in My Eyes". The band released The Collection, their first "greatest hits" album at the end of the year, featuring all the singles from 1980 onwards. The album peaked at no. 2 in the UK and was later certified triple platinum.

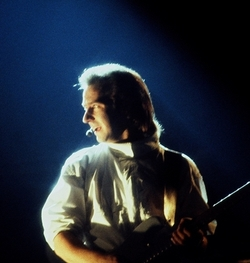
Ure performing live with Ultravox at the Bristol Hippodrome in 1984

After Ure's successful debut solo studio album in 1985, the fifth and final Ultravox studio album with Ure, U-Vox, was released in October 1986. Although another Top 10 hit, the album (and singles) fared less well than their earlier releases. After the end of the U-Vox Tour Ure left Ultravox. He stated in an Extreme Voice Fanzine 1991: "The spark kind of went out of it for me, Live Aid and Band Aid had a lot to do with it, I suppose. We had a long break from each other and when we came back together we were all working in different directions". "I think we went out with a kind of whimper but we chose to do that really, we didn't do the all-singing, all-dancing farewell tour cash-in that a load of bands do. I had decided that I was leaving before we did our last European tour, the U-Vox tour. We were in Italy."

Ure and Currie had met in October 2008 and played an acoustic "Vienna" together on Absolute Radio in UK. In April 2009, Ure and the other members (Cann, Currie and Cross) reformed Ultravox for the Return to Eden tour to celebrate the 30th anniversary of the album Vienna (1980), and in their own words, the "anniversary of their classic line-up". Ure stated in a BBC interview in April 2009, "we are not trying to get our youth back, nor the hair that's fallen off already". After appearing at the Isle of Wight Festival 2009 Ultravox followed up the next year with a second round of the tour. In late 2010, Ultravox started working on their sixth studio album fronted by Ure. This album, titled Brilliant, was released in May 2012. Following this release the band embarked on the 'Brilliant Tour' performing shows in the UK and Europe in late 2012. In November 2013, Ultravox were special guests on a four-date arena tour with Simple Minds. Ure also did backstage photography for Ultravox.

=== Solo career ===
==== Initial and The Gift (1982–1988) ====
In June 1982 Ure released his first solo single, a cover version of the 1968 Tom Rush song "No Regrets" (based on the 1975 hit cover version by the Walker Brothers), which made the UK Top 10. Ure also recorded the David Bowie track "The Man Who Sold the World" for the soundtrack to the British comedy film Party Party (1983). Ure met bassist Mick Karn at the first ever Prince's Trust concert in May 1982. Sir George Martin was the musical director and Pete Townshend of the Who was the band leader. In three days in February 1983 Ure and Karn were at AIR Studios in London and recorded the UK top 40 single "After a Fashion". They also travelled to Cairo to film one of the most expensive music videos that Karn would ever be involved in.

After working on the Band Aid project and during a hiatus from Ultravox, Ure pursued a solo career in 1985. The single "If I Was" released in September was a UK number one single, and his debut studio album, The Gift, reached No. 2. Ure recruited Mick Ronson to play guitar on his upcoming solo tour. They rehearsed, but Ure was not satisfied with Ronson's playing. A rehearsal live recording of "Fade to Grey" with Ronson's guitar is available from 27 September 1985. Zal Cleminson took over in the five-piece band, alongside Craig Armstrong on keyboards and Kenny Hyslop on drums. After returning to Ultravox for what would be their last studio album together until their 2012 reunion album, the band effectively disbanded in 1987 and Ure concentrated solely on his solo career but with less commercial success.

==== Label changes (1988–1996) ====
Ure's second studio album, Answers to Nothing (1988), reached the UK top 30. It featured a duet with Kate Bush called "Sister and Brother", and the single "Dear God", which helped Ure gain his first foothold with American audiences. It reached No. 6 on the US Billboard Mainstream Rock chart and at No. 4 on the US Billboard Alternative Music chart. The following year Ure toured in the US with Howard Jones.

A change of label to Arista-BMG for his third solo studio album Pure (1991) saw him back in the UK Top 40. It contained the single "Cold, Cold Heart" which reached UK Top 20, and "I See Hope in the Morning Light", a song written about the possible release of Nelson Mandela and recorded as a celebration. 11 November 1991, Ure played at the Royal Albert Hall, with a five-piece band featuring drummer Mark Brzezicki, keyboardist Josh Phillips, bass player Jeremy Meehan, and multi-instrumentalists Steven A. Williams and Willie Dowling. From 22 March to 22 April 1992 Ure toured in the US with four songwriters, Don Henry, Chip Taylor, Darden Smith and Rosie Flores. The tour was called "In Their Own Words".

If I Was, a retrospective compilation album of solo and Ultravox hits, was released in February 1993 by Chrysalis. It went as high as number 10 in the UK album chart. To support the release he went on a tour in the UK called "Out Alone" which saw Ure performing on his own, accompanying himself primarily on just an acoustic guitar and a keyboard. Ure also made an appearance at the prestigious Oxford University Union Debating Society.

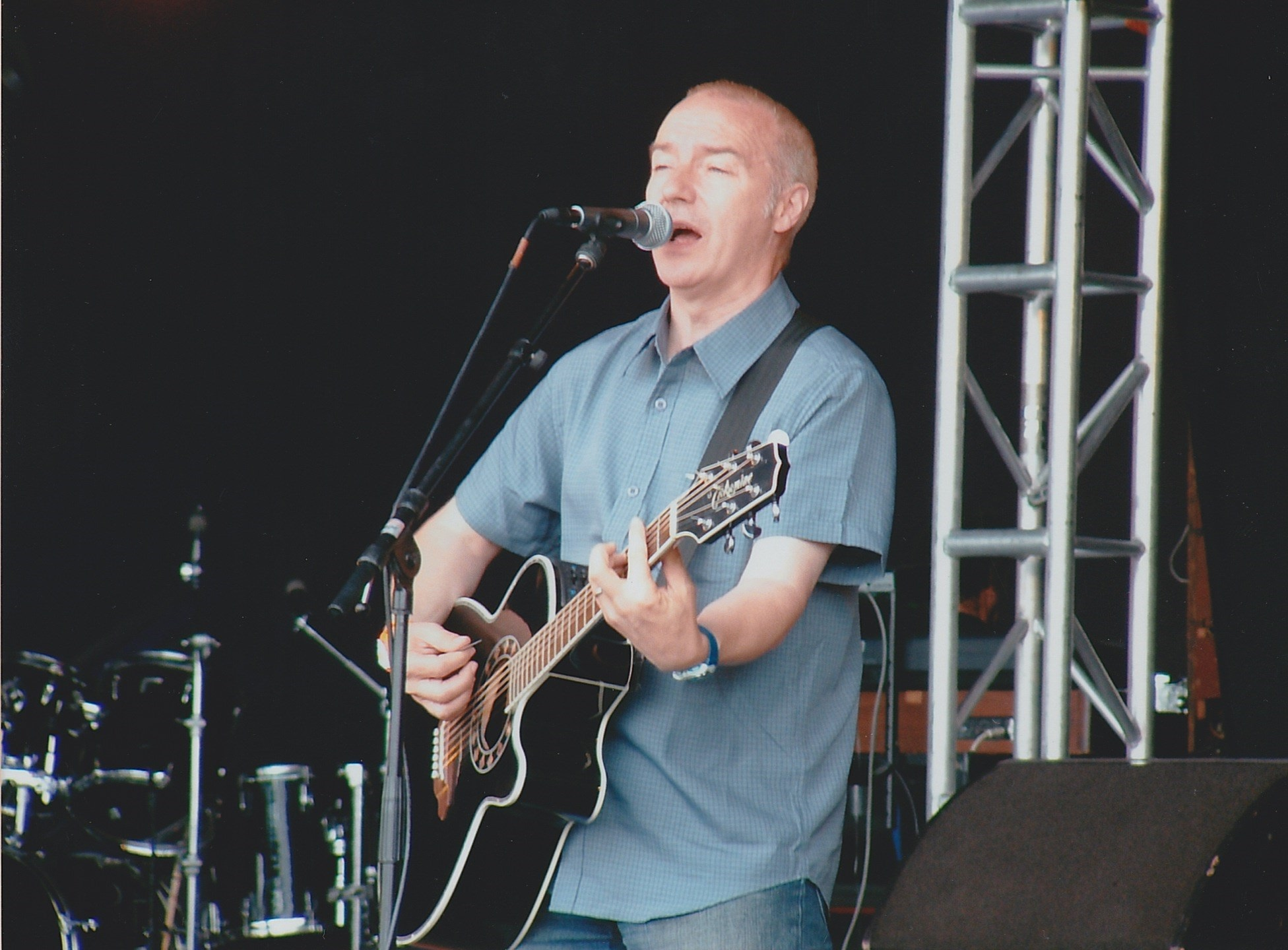
Ure performing at the 2004 Guilfest Festival

==== Breathe and success (1996–2004) ====
His fourth solo studio album, Breathe (1996), was produced by Richard Feldman. This album had a very Celtic feel with a plethora of acoustic instruments from Uilleann pipes to mandolins and accordions. Ure said in an interview 2001: "My lowest point was when my album Breathe came out. I spent two years writing and recording it to find that people weren't taking any notice. As a result all the doors that were normally open to me, such as television, had closed." In 1996 the new Breathe album was followed by further extensive touring, including dates in the US as special guest to the Chieftains.

In 1998 the single "Breathe" became a hit single, in several European countries boosted by its use in a Swatch TV ad campaign, two years after its original release. It entered at No. 1 on both the Italian and the Austrian charts. In 1998 Ure played on a European tour with Troy Donockley, and he also recorded the soundtrack to two American films that year, both directed by Richard Schenkman, October 22, and Went to Coney Island on a Mission from God... Be Back by Five.

Ure's fifth solo studio album, Move Me, was first released September 2000, on Arista label in Germany, later to be released 2001 in the UK on Curb Records. 28 March 2001 Ure was the subject of the This Is Your Life TV show hosted by Michael Aspel on BBC. The same year Ure also released Little Orphans exclusively from his website. A compilation of previously unreleased recordings. It contained "Feel So Good" with Gordon Giltrap, "Heart" with Chip Taylor, "Personal Heaven" with Glenn Gregory of Heaven 17 and two songs recorded with Mick Karn, Steve Jansen and Richard Barbieri of Japan.

==== Autobiography and 10 (2004–2014) ====
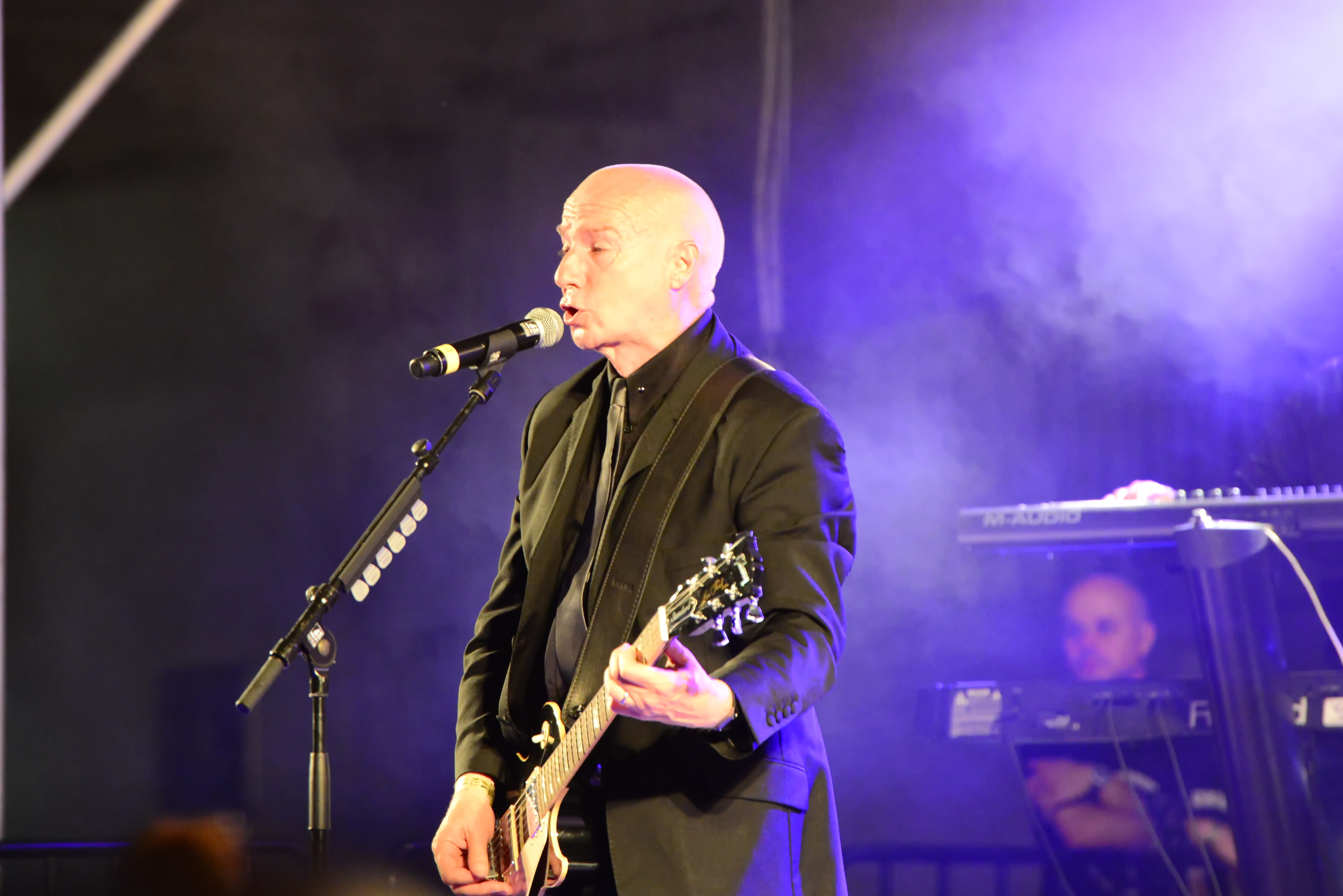
Ure performing at the Amphi Festival, 2014

In November 2004 Ure released his autobiography, If I Was, through Virgin Books. In September 2008 10 was released. The album contains Ure's own interpretations of 10 songs that influenced him and shaped his songwriting. It was recorded in a log cabin in Eastern Canada, near Montreal, during the long snow bound winter of 2007–2008.

==== Fragile and other ventures (2014–2017) ====
Ure worked for over a decade on the next solo studio album, Fragile, which was released on 7 July 2014. The making of Fragile coincided with Ultravox's 2012 reunion album Brilliant. Reuniting with Ultravox inspired him to focus on music again, and ultimately finish the material that would become Fragile. The album featured the song "Dark, Dark Night", a collaboration with Moby.

In August 2014, Ure also returned to the US with the Retro Futura Tour, featuring Howard Jones, Tom Bailey of Thompson Twins, China Crisis and Katrina Leskanich of Katrina and the Waves. In 2015, Ure's recording of "The Man Who Sold the World" was featured in the video game Metal Gear Solid V: The Phantom Pain.

==== Further releases (2017–present) ====
On 1 December 2017, the Orchestrated album was released. It features orchestrated re-recordings of Ultravox and solo career songs arranged by the British composer Ty Unwin, and a new written track called "Ordinary Man". Ure returned to North America in the summer of 2018 on a co-headline tour with Paul Young, called "The Soundtrack of Your Life Tour". In 2019 Ure continued to tour with the Band Electronica (Russell Field, Cole Stacey, Joseph O'Keefe) with "The 1980 Tour", during which they performed Ultravox's album Vienna (1980) in full and also included highlights from Visage's self-titled debut studio album. On 27 September 2019, Chrysalis Records released Soundtrack 1978-2019, a 32-song collection, encompassing four decades of Ure's rich and varied career.

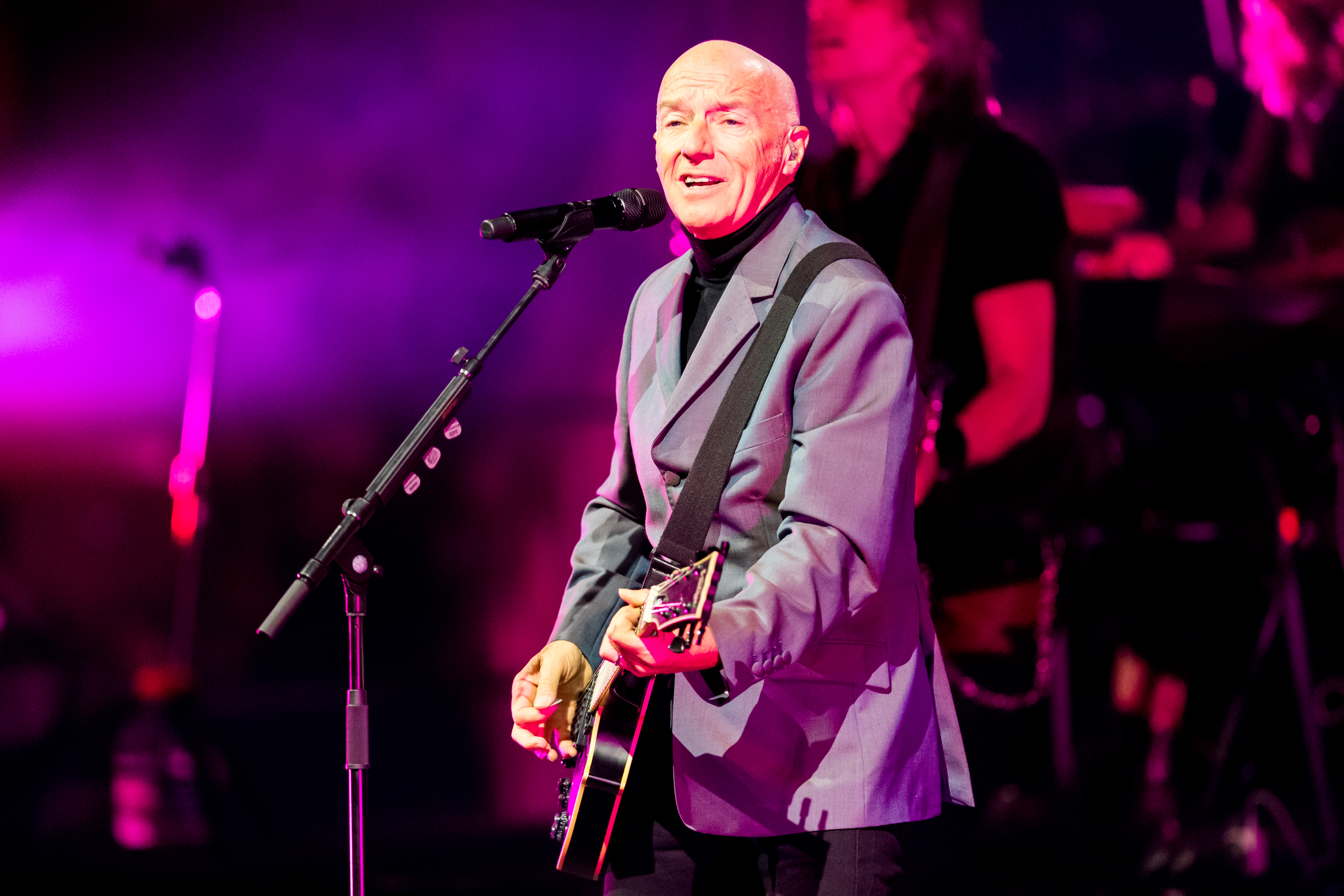
Ure performing at Rock Meets Classic, 2024

In August 2020, Ure was creating his "Backstage Lockdown Club" with livestreamed acoustic songs and Q&A sessions, to members on the Patreon website. Ure also invited other artists, including Mark King of Level 42, Glenn Gregory, Howard Jones, Nik Kershaw, Gary Kemp, and Clare Grogan of Altered Images. From 4 January 2021 Ure was hosting on Scala Radio, on their show The Space. 8 October 2021 Ure released the single "Das Beat" with Band Electronica. The project came about when Ure was performing in Düsseldorf in 2020. Wolfgang Flür of Kraftwerk was in the audience and later asked Ure to join a new project he was working on. A few days later, with thoughts of Flür's electronic drumming, the role Düsseldorf has played in the scene, Ure wrote "Das Beat". Whilst Flür went on to record his own version of the song for his album Magazine 1 released in 2022, Ure laid down "Das Beat" with Band Electronica in its original form.

Following the 2019's 'The 1980 Tour', Ure and the Band Electronica returned in 2022 with the 'Voice & Visions' tour in Europe, celebrating 40 years since the release of Ultravox studio albums Rage in Eden (1981) and Quartet (1982). The much delayed UK leg of the 'Voice & Visions' tour began at Sheffield City Hall in April 2023, and was scheduled to play at 28 venues before concluding in Swindon at the end of May.

To mark his 70th birthday, Ure headlined a one-night-only concert at the Royal Albert Hall on 4 October 2023, subtitled 'Celebrating 7 Decades: A Life In Music'. The concert was recorded and released as the live album Live at The Royal Albert Hall 04.10.23 on 8 November 2024.

On 10 March 2026, Midge Ure surprised fans by announcing the release of a double album of new material entitled A Man Of Two Worlds. The album release date (8 May 2026) coincided with the start of his "A Man of Two Worlds" tour which was announced in 2025.

It is his first new material in 12 years, following up his critically acclaimed solo album Fragile. The album is split into two "worlds". World One: Music, consists of eight instrumental pieces, while the second half, World Two: Songs, features eight vocal songs.

Ure explained that the LP's 'split' concept was partly inspired by the time he spent during lockdown listening to instrumental music, and some of the work he heard whilst presenting "THE SPACE" late night show on Scala Radio (now Magic Classical). Hearing music that rarely finds a home on mainstream radio, he set about making something without lyrics to guide the way, where the melodies had to speak for themselves. He began writing what became a strong selection of instrumental pieces—music shaped by reflection, uncertainty, and a strange kind of quiet. The eight vocal songs which form the second part of the album, came to Midge as the world reopened. A more divided world, in many ways a much harder and less empathetic one. Sharing an atmosphere with the preceding instrumentals, these songs are sparse and meditative, and whilst they are subtle, with some songs dealing with the frailty of the human condition, underlying many songs is a reflection of Ure's concerns for the discord infecting world today.

The lead single from the album "Just Words" was also released to coincide with the album release announcement and is available on all usual streaming sites as well as YouTube.

The album marks Ure's return to Chrysalis Records, which will release it under an exclusive licence. Ure previously recorded for the label during a period of commercial activity in his career.

== Other works ==
=== Band Aid ===
In November 1984, Ure co-wrote the Band Aid hit "Do They Know It's Christmas?" with Bob Geldof. Ure was rehearsing with Ultravox for an episode of the Channel 4 music show The Tube when host Paula Yates handed him the phone. It was her then husband, Geldof, who proceeded, recalls Ure, "to rant on about the Michael Buerk BBC news report on the Ethiopian famine". Geldof provided the initial lyrics, with Ure working the musical theme on a small keyboard in his kitchen. The second half was composed by Ure, with the bridging chorus only assembled in the studio when the artists had gathered. Ure has described the song as not one of the best he has ever written, commenting that "the momentum the artists gave it in the recording studio is what made it".

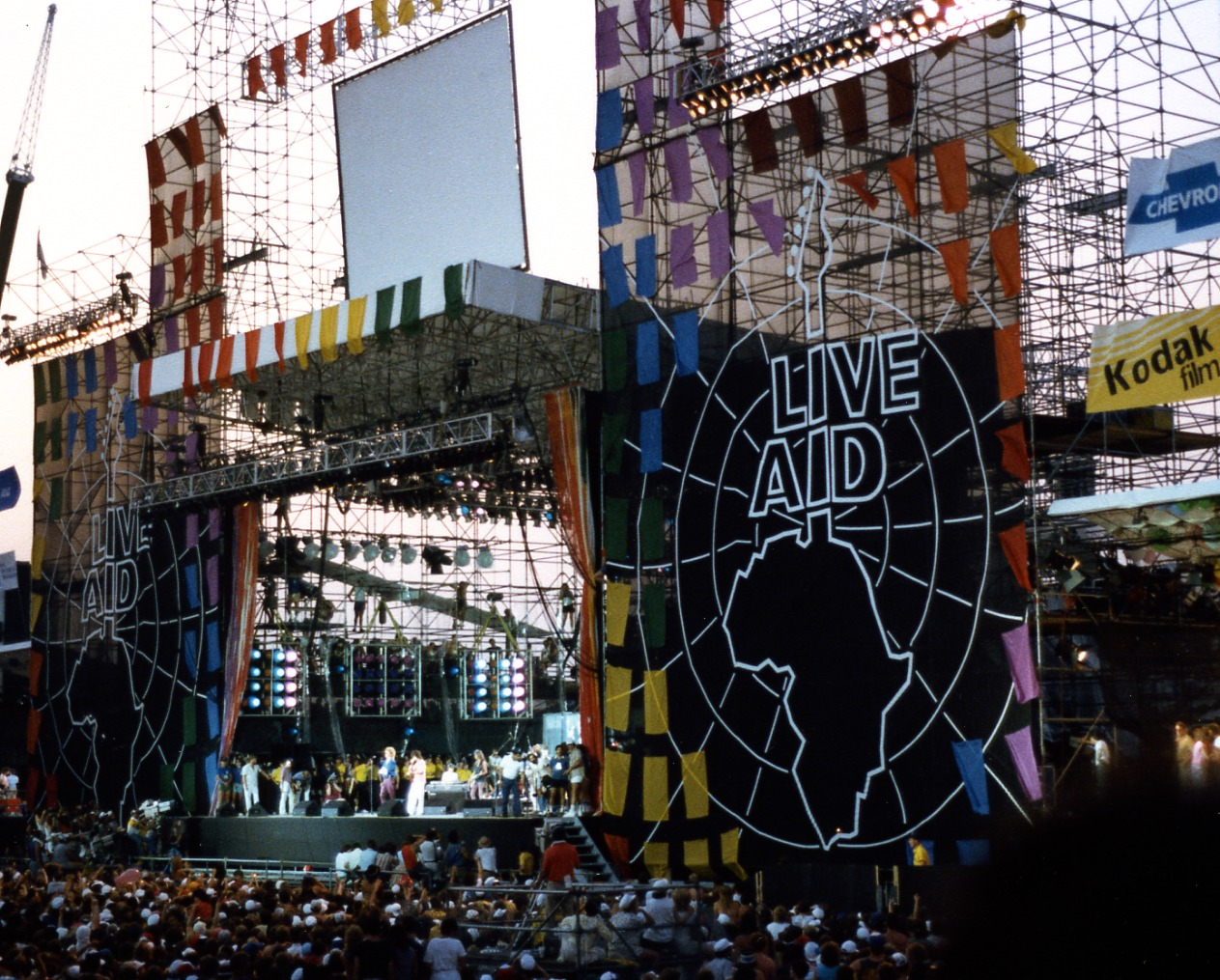
Ure co-organised the Live Aid concerts with Bob Geldof which took place in July 1985.

At the studio recording Ure took on the production duties for the song. Although Trevor Horn had been approached to undertake this role, he needed more time to fulfill other obligations than was available. Ure stepped into the breach, with Horn providing his studio, remixing the track and producing the 12" version. Ure and Geldof jointly set up the Band Aid Trust, and he remains active as a Band Aid Trustee. He also co-organised the Live Aid concert of 1985 along with Geldof and Harvey Goldsmith. Geldof and Ure have been honoured with two Ivor Novello Awards for writing the song.

=== Benefit concerts ===
In 1988, Ure helped to organise the Nelson Mandela 70th Birthday Tribute, at which he also performed. He first performed at The Prince's Trust rock concert 1982, and has also been the musical director at the concerts 1986, 1987, 1988, 2010 and 2011. Ure performed at Music for Montserrat on 15 September 1997 to raise funds for the Caribbean island of Montserrat, which had been devastated by Hurricane Hugo in 1989 and again in 1997, when the island was impacted by volcanic activity. Ure himself lost a house on Montserrat, which was destroyed.

On 24 July 1999, Ure was the musical director of the Wicked Women concert for the Breakthrough Breast Cancer charity held at Hyde Park in London, featuring artists Ronan Keating, Big Country and Lisa Stansfield.

=== Live 8 ===
In 2005, he organised Live 8 concerts with Bob Geldof with the aim of pressing G8 leaders into taking action to end world poverty. Later that year he was appointed an Officer of the Order of the British Empire (OBE) for services to music and charity in the 2005 Birthday Honours.

=== Honorary accolades and charity ===
He has received five honorary degrees and was made an Honorary Doctor of Arts in 2005 by the University of Abertay Dundee for his artistic and charity work over the past 30 years. He was made a Doctor of Music by University of Edinburgh in 2006. In 2007, he received his third honorary doctorate, from the University of Paisley, for his contribution to Scottish culture and charity work. In 2008, Glasgow Caledonian University awarded him his fourth honorary doctorate, for his musical and humanitarian achievements.

Ure was awarded an honorary Doctor of Laws from the University of Bath in December 2010. As an ambassador for Save the Children, Ure returned to Ethiopia in 2004 and 2009 and visited Sierra Leone in 2006.

In August 2020, Ure contributed on ReMission International, Wayne Husseys re-recording of the Mission's "Tower of Strength" called "TOS 2020", to help COVID-19 charities around the world.

== Personal life ==
Midge Ure lives near Bath with his wife, actress and yoga teacher Sheridan Forbes, whom he married in 2003. They have three daughters.

He was first married to television presenter, actress and novelist Annabel Giles in 1985. They divorced in 1989, and had one daughter, Molly Lorenne, who was frontwoman and lead guitarist in The Faders from 2004 to 2006. Giles died on 20 November 2023 from a brain tumour.

Ure appeared on the 2007 Celebrity MasterChef series, winning his heat and progressing to the final on 15 June, alongside Nadia Sawalha and Craig Revel Horwood.

Ure has been a recovering alcoholic since 2005, something he discusses openly and has written about in his 2004 autobiography If I Was, the name of his 1985 hit single.

== Solo discography ==
- The Gift (1985)
- Answers to Nothing (1988)
- Pure (1991)
- Breathe (1996)
- Move Me (2000)
- 10 (2008)
- Fragile (2014)
- Orchestrated (2017)
- A Man of Two Worlds (2026)
