= Acoustic (Simple Minds album) =

Studio album by Simple Minds
- Released: 11 November 2016
- Recorded: June 2016
- Studio: Gorbals Studio, Glasgow, Scotland; Southwest Studios, Battersea, England (additional recording and mixing)
- Genre: Acoustic
- Label: Caroline International
- Producer: Andy Wright; Gavin Goldberg; Simple Minds

Simple Minds chronology
Live – Big Music Tour 2015 (2015)	Acoustic (2016)	Acoustic In Concert (2017)

Simple Minds studio albums chronology
Big Music (2014)	Acoustic (2016)	Walk Between Worlds (2018)

Singles from Acoustic
- 1. "Promised You a Miracle" Released: 28 September 2016

Acoustic is the seventeenth studio album by Scottish rock band Simple Minds, released in November 2016 by Caroline International. The album features acoustic studio recordings of previously released songs. It received mixed reviews.

== Background ==
The genesis of Acoustic can be traced back to a rare live session the band recorded for the BBC Radio Two's Chris Evans Breakfast Show on 26 September 2014, (Note: During the Chris Evans Breakfast Show on 26 September 2014, a minimalist (new) line-up of Simple Minds (reduced to Jim Kerr, Charlie Burchill and Mark Kerr) performed acoustically four songs: "Don't You (Forget About Me)", "Alive and Kicking", "Honest Town" and "Riders on the Storm".) then promoting their 16th studio album, Big Music. To the band's surprise, the reaction was overwhelmingly favourable.

The band performed acoustic sets during some other one-off live appearances (radio sessions or showcase events) including one held on 22 November 2014 in Paris by French radio station RTL notable for a rare outing of "Mandela Day". (Note: During the RTL Show on 22 November 2014, Simple Minds (reduced to Jim Kerr, Charlie Burchill and Mark Kerr) performed acoustically five songs: "Honest Town" (3:50), "Let the Day Begin" (video not available), "Mandela Day" (4:01), "Don't You (Forget About Me)" (4:03) and "Alive and Kicking" (5:33), four of which made available on RTL's website.)

Besides Kerr and Burchill the band consists of Ged Grimes (bass), Sarah Brown (backing vocals), Gordy Goudie (guitars) and Cherisse Osei (drums).

== Singles ==
The acoustic version of "Promised You a Miracle", featuring Scottish singer-songwriter KT Tunstall, was released on 28 September 2016.

== Commercial performance ==
The album debuted at number 16 on the UK Albums Chart, selling 10,427 units, and becoming Simple Minds' 14th top 20 album.

== Critical reception ==
The album received mixed reviews, with Timothy Monger from AllMusic noting that the band "missed out on an opportunity to dramatically shake up their repertoire". Andy Gill in The Independent found it "a welcome spring clean" and noted the folk influences. David Quantick, writing for Classic Rock, described it as "a strange album, seeking as it does to homogenise the Minds’ ever-changing sound" but concluded that it was "a consistent collection", highlighting the Richard Hawley cover "Long Black Train" as "movingly effective".

== Track listing ==
=== Standard edition ===
No.	Title	Writer(s)	Length
1.	"The American"	Jim Kerr, Charlie Burchill, Mick MacNeil, Derek Forbes, Brian McGee	4:30
2.	"Promised You a Miracle" (featuring KT Tunstall)	Kerr, Burchill, MacNeil, Forbes	4:35
3.	"Glittering Prize"	Kerr, Burchill, MacNeil, Forbes	4:07
4.	"See the Lights"	Kerr, Burchill	4:58
5.	"New Gold Dream (81-82-83-84)"	Kerr, Burchill, MacNeil, Forbes	4:58
6.	"Someone Somewhere in Summertime"	Kerr, Burchill, MacNeil, Forbes	4:40
7.	"Waterfront"	Kerr, Burchill, MacNeil, Forbes	5:16
8.	"Sanctify Yourself"	Kerr, Burchill, MacNeil	4:59
9.	"Chelsea Girl"	Kerr, Burchill	4:28
10.	"Alive and Kicking"	Kerr, Burchill, MacNeil	5:53
11.	"Don't You (Forget About Me)"	Keith Forsey, Steve Schiff	5:16
12.	"Long Black Train"	Richard Hawley	4:34

=== Double LP bonus tracks ===
No.	Title	Writer(s)	Length
13.	"Stand by Love"	Kerr, Burchill	4:11
14.	"Speed Your Love to Me"	Kerr, Burchill, MacNeil, Forbes	4:03
15.	"Light Travels"	Kerr, Burchill, Jez Coad, Sean Kelly	4:40

Notes

- Two different formats are released: a single compact-disc version and a double LP version including 3 exclusive extra tracks, the latter released only on 25 November 2016.

== Personnel ==
Simple Minds

- Jim Kerr – vocals
- Charlie Burchill – guitar, accordion, programming, arrangements

Additional personnel

- Ged Grimes – bass, backing vocals
- Gordy Goudie – guitar, harmonica, additional arrangements
- Sarah Brown – backing vocals
- Cherisse Osei – percussion
- KT Tunstall – vocals, guitar, bass, backing vocal arrangement on "Promised You a Miracle"
- Lewis Chapman – additional percussion, programming
- Andy Wright – producer, programming
- Gavin Goldberg – producer, engineer, mixing, programming
- Simple Minds – producer
- Jean-Pierre Chalbos – mastering
- Stuart Crouch Creative – art direction, design
- Ruth Rowland – handlettering
- Alan Wild – photography
- Eric Misko – photography
- Paul Cox – photography
- Paul Khera – photography

== Charts ==
=== Weekly charts ===
Chart (2016)	Peak position
Belgian Albums (Ultratop Flanders)	12
Belgian Albums (Ultratop Wallonia)	11
Dutch Albums (Album Top 100)	27
French Albums (SNEP)	122
German Albums (Offizielle Top 100)	39
Irish Albums (IRMA)	61
Italian Albums (FIMI)	31
Portuguese Albums (AFP)	43
Scottish Albums (OCC)	8
Spanish Albums (PROMUSICAE)	72
Swiss Albums (Schweizer Hitparade)	33
UK Albums (OCC)	16

=== Year-end charts ===
Chart (2016)	Position
Belgian Albums (Ultratop Flanders)	184
Belgian Albums (Ultratop Wallonia)	155

== Certifications ==
Region	Certification	Certified units/sales
United Kingdom (BPI)	Silver	60,000^{‡}
^{‡} Sales+streaming figures based on certification alone.
