= List of Simple Minds concert tours =

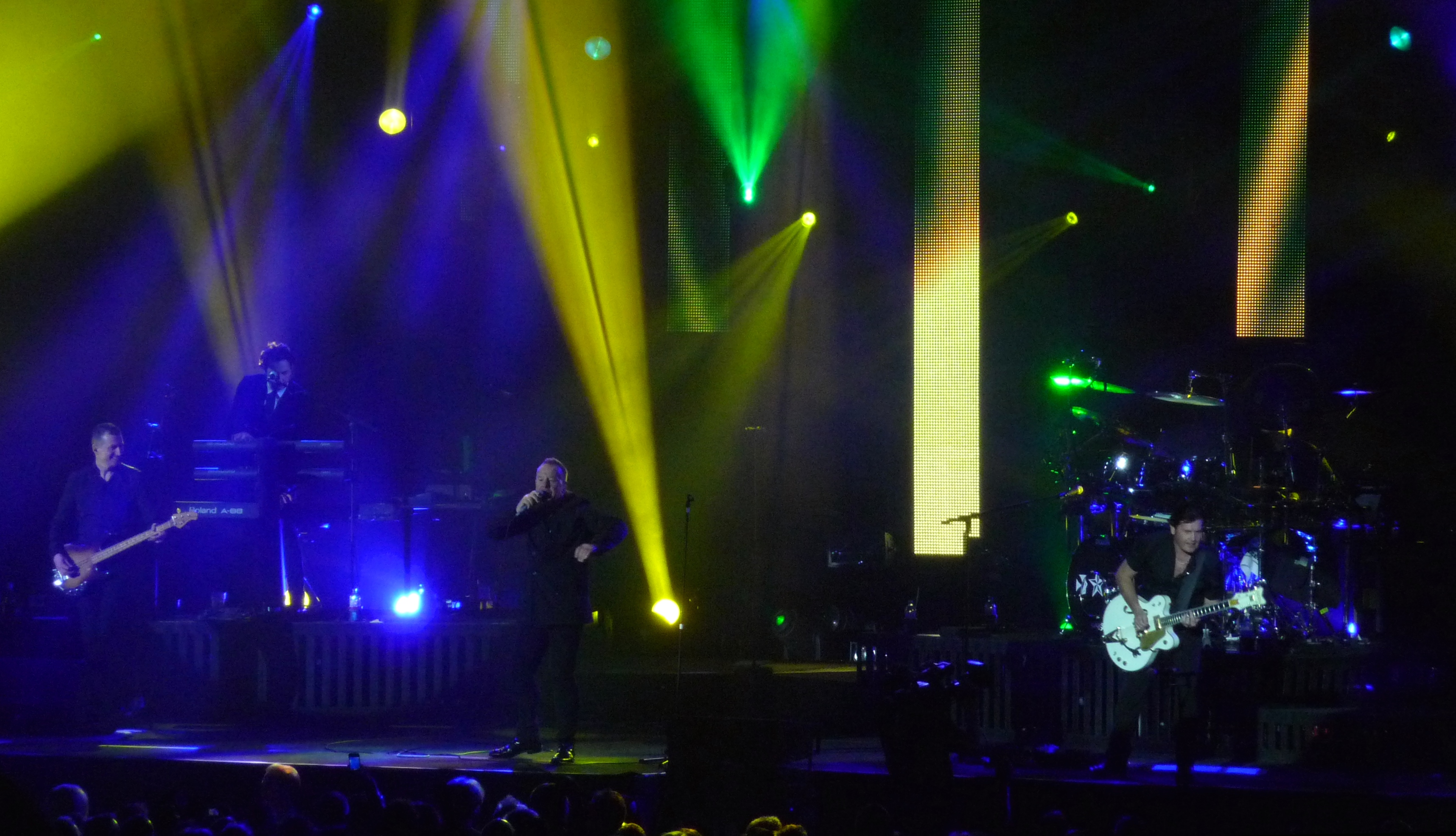
Simple Minds Greatest Hits Tour, London, November 2013

This is the tour history of the Scottish rock band Simple Minds.

Formed in 1977, the band have toured internationally on a semi-regular basis since 1979.

Simple Minds' August 1986 shows in Paris on their Once Upon A Time Tour were recorded and released in May 1987 as the live album Live in the City of Light. The double album set reached number one on the UK Albums Chart.

Simple Minds released in May 1990 on (VHS) home video as Verona their first ever live film featuring (only) parts of their show on 15 September 1989 in Verona, Italy during their Street Fighting Years tour.

24 years later, Simple Minds released in May 2014 on DVD/CD their second ever live film titled Celebrate – Live at the Glasgow SSE Hydro featuring their complete show on 27 November 2013 at the SSE Hydro in Glasgow, Scotland, UK during their Greatest Hits + tour.

On 4 October 2019, Simple Minds released the double live album Live in the City of Angels, mostly recorded on 24 October 2018 at the Orpheum Theatre, Los Angeles, California (i.e. the City of Angels) during their biggest ever (2018) North American tour.

== 1970s tours ==
=== 1977 ===
- "Johnny and the Self Abusers 1977" (11 April – November 1977; Scotland Tour as "Johnny and the Self Abusers") (for the final 1977 gig of this first line-up which took place in November 1977 at the Glasgow Art School, the band was billed as "Simple Minds")

=== 1978 ===
- "Simple Minds 1978" (17 January-28 December 1978; Scotland Tour) (Simple Minds gave "officially" their first gig on 17 January 1978 at Satellite City in Glasgow during which they played (among other tracks) 'Act of Love', 'Pleasantly Disturbed', 'White Light-White Heat', 'Wasteland'; they particularly performed at the Astoria, Edinburgh supporting The Only Ones)

=== 1979 ===
- "Life in a Day Tour" (January–September 1979; UK Tour) (9 January: one-off appearance at Edinburgh University's Pollock Halls of Residence; 28 March-8 September: UK Tour)
- "Real To Real Cacophony Tour" (October 1979-June 1980; mostly Europe Tour) (11–18 October 1979: Europe leg#1; 24&25 October 1979: (2) USA gigs; 29 October-4 November 1979: (Northern) Europe leg#2; 15 November 1979 – 24 February 1980: UK leg)

== 1980s tours ==
=== 1980 ===
- "Real To Real Cacophony Tour" continuation (October 1979-June 1980; mostly Europe Tour) (15 November 1979 – 24 February 1980: UK leg; France gig in Paris on 12 January 1980; 2 March-20 June 1980: Europe leg#3 [including 2–7 March 1980: Germany leg & 14–23 March 1980: The Netherlands leg])
- "Empires And Dance Tour 1980" (August 1980-January 1981: Europe Tour) (26 August 1980: UK gig in London; 30 August-6 September 1980: Europe leg#1; 7–14 September 1980: France leg; 15 September-11 October 1980: Europe leg#2; 17 October 1980 – 2 January 1981: UK leg)

=== 1981 ===
- "Empires And Dance Tour 1981" (March 1981: mostly North-America Tour) (1&3 March: (2) UK gigs; 13 March: France appearance at Studio Gabriel in Paris; 17–27 March: North-America Tour)
- "Sons And Fascination Tour 1981" (August–December 1981; World Tour) (28 August-25 September: UK leg#1; 16 October-9 November: North-America leg (USA & Canada); 13 November-13 December: Australia leg; 20&21 December: (2) Spain shows; 22–29 December: UK leg#2)

=== 1982–1983 ===
- "Sons And Fascination Tour 1982" (February–August 1982; Europe Tour) (16 February-16 June: Europe leg#1; 14–18 July: UK & Ireland leg; 24 July-16 August: Europe leg#2)
- "New Gold Tour" (September 1982-August 1983; World Tour) (3 September 1982: Finland show in Helsinki; 8–17 September 1982: UK leg#1; 27 September-21 October 1982: Australia & New Zealand leg; 24 October-7 November 1982: North-America leg#1 (Canada only); 18 November-21 December 1982: UK (& Ireland) leg#2; 1–29 March 1983: Europe leg#1; 8 April-15 May 1983: North-America leg#2 (USA & Canada); 23 May-16 July 1983: Europe leg#2; 23 July-3 August 1983: North-America leg#3 (only 2 USA gigs & 1 Canada gig); 14 August 1983: Ireland show in Dublin)

=== 1983–1984 ===
- "Tour Du Monde" (November 1983-September 1984; World Tour) (27 November-23 December 1983: UK leg#1; 27 January-9 February 1984: Australia & New Zealand leg; 18–21 February 1984: Ireland leg; 22 February-20 March 1984: UK leg#2; 24 March-27 April 1984: Europe leg#1; 5–19 May 1984: UK leg#3; 25 May-19 June 1984: North-America leg#1; 24 June-8 July 1984 : Europe leg#2; 25 July-5 September 1984: North-America leg#2; 11–15 September 1984: Japan leg)

=== 1985 ===
- "Barrowland 1985" (only 3 UK shows on 3, 4 & 5 January 1985 at the Barrowland Ballroom, Glasgow)
- "Live Aid" (short appearance at the "Live Aid" benefit concert on 13 July 1985 at the JFK Stadium, Philadelphia, Pennsylvania, US with a 3-track set-list: 'Ghostdancing' / 'Don't You (Forget About Me)' / 'Promised You A Miracle')

=== 1986 ===
- "Once Upon A Time Tour" (31 October 1985 – 9 November 1986; World Tour) (31 October-24 November 1985: North-America leg#1; 1 December 1985 – 17 February 1986: Europe leg#1; 23 February-3 March 1986: UK leg; 25 March-28 May 1986: North-America leg#2; 6 June-17 August 1986 : Europe leg#2; 10–15 October 1986: Japan leg; 20 October-9 November 1986 : Australia & New Zealand leg)

=== 1987 ===
- "Cash For Kids" (only 3 UK shows on 14, 15 & 16 December 1987 at Barrowland Ballroom, Glasgow where the band played the rare trio of 'Pleasantly Disturbed', 'Room' and 'Capital City')

=== 1988 ===
- "Brazil 1988" (7 & 14 January 1988; only 2 shows in Rio de Janeiro & São Paulo)
- "Summer 1988 UK shows"(only 2 shows: on 11 June 1988 at Wembley Stadium, London, UK (Nelson Mandela 70th Birthday Tribute during which Simple Minds played 'Mandela Day' live for the first time) & on 14 July 1988 at Wembley, London, UK)

=== 1989 ===
- "Street Fighting Years Tour" (16 May-28 November 1989; Europe & Australia Tours; 16 May-18 July: Europe leg#1; 23 July-26 August: UK (& Ireland) leg; 28 August-30 September: Europe leg#2; 18–28 November: Australia leg)

== 1990s tours ==
=== 1990 ===
- "Nelson Mandela: An International Tribute for a Free South Africa"(short appearance on 16 April 1990 at Wembley Stadium, London, UK; 2-track set-list: 'Mandela Day' / 'Sun City')
- "Germany 1990" (25 August-2 September 1990; Germany Mini-Tour; 4 shows)

=== 1991 ===
- "Real Life Tour" (23 May-23 October 1991; World Tour) (23 May-19 June: North-America leg; 25 June-5 August: Europe leg#1; 7 August-24 August: UK leg; 27 August-23 October: Europe leg#2)

=== 1994 ===
- "US Christmas Shows" (3 – 18 December 1994; US Tour; nine promotional shows sponsored by local radio stations such as HFS Baltimore, WDRE New York and KROQ Los Angeles, featuring a 4/5-track setlist: 'She's A River' / 'Don't You (Forget About Me)' / 'See The Lights' / 'Sanctify Yourself' / 'Alive And Kicking')

=== 1995 ===
- "Good News From The Next World Tour" (9 February-5 November 1995; World Tour) (9 February-2 March: North-America leg; 17–27 March: UK leg#1 & Ireland dates; 30 March-26 August: Europe leg#1; 3–13 September: UK leg#2; 16–21 September: South America leg; 24–30 September: South Africa leg; 3–22 October: Europe leg#2; 23 October-5 November: France leg). Including *"Rock Summer" (14 July 1995; Tallinn Estonia)

=== 1997 ===
- "(Spring/Summer) Festival Tour 1997" (13 June-10 August 1997; European Tour (including UK & Ireland legs))
- "Night of the Proms '97" (31 October-7 December 1997; 32 shows mostly in Belgium, Netherlands & Germany with a 4-track set-list: 'Alive And Kicking' / 'Someone Somewhere (In Summertime)' / 'Belfast Child' / 'Don't You (Forget About Me)')

=== 1998 ===
- "Neapolis Tour" (11 February-21 July 1998; European Tour; 39 shows)

=== 1999 ===
- "Scotland Rocks For Kosovo" (Simple Minds was invited to play at this benefit gig on 31 May 1999 in aid of refugees settling in the country; with a 4-track set-list: 'Waterfront' / 'Someone Somewhere (In Summertime)' / 'Alive And Kicking' / 'Don't You (Forget About Me)')

== 2000s tours ==
=== 2001 ===
- "Grand Prix Night of the Proms" (only 2 low-key Proms gigs on 24 & 26 May 2001 in Belgium & France with a 3-track set-list: 'Don't You (Forget About Me)' / 'Belfast Child' / 'Alive And Kicking')

=== 2002 ===
- "The Floating World Tour" (15 April-18 October 2002; World Tour) (27 February 2002: appearance at Heineken Music Hall in Amsterdam, Netherlands to receive an award from the Edison Awards; 15 April-3 May: UK leg; 5 May-4 June: Europe leg#1 [including 8–18 May : Germany leg (9 shows)]; 13 June-4 July: North-America (USA & Canada) leg (16 shows) [= Simple Minds' first North-America tour in 7 years]; 7 July-17 August: Europe leg#2 [including a Monaco show on 10 August; last show of Europe leg#2 on 17 August in Bilbao, Spain; last show of The Floating World Tour on 18 October at the "Lifestyle Music" Festival, Dubai, United Arab Emirates) (this tour is named after the last track of the new album Cry (2002); the set-list includes only a handful of new tracks from the new album, mostly 'Cry', 'New Sunshine Morning', 'Spaceface' (with the notorious "Fish & Chips" lyrics on 17 August in Bilbao), 'One Step Closer' but also some tracks rarely played such as 'Space' from the delayed Our Secrets are the Same (2004) or (as an encore) 'Theme For Great Cities', 'Changeling' or 'Dead Vandals')
- "Night of the Proms '02" (25 October-22 December 2002; 40 shows)

=== 2003 ===
- "Alive And Kicking Tour" (27 June-20 December 2003; Europe Tour (including a UK leg)) (a sort of continuation of the previous "Floating World" tour with a different set-list including "new" old tracks such as 'Hunter and the Hunted', 'Premonition', 'Book of Brilliant Things', 'Street Fighting Years', the medley 'Ghostdancing / Gloria / Light My Fire' or (as an encore) 'Let It All Come Down' or (of course) 'Alive And Kicking')

=== 2004 ===
- "(Spring/Summer) Festival Tour 2004" (22 May-14 August 2004; Europe Tour (including a UK leg)) (during this tour, Simple Minds followed the tried-and-tested formula of working on the new studio album during the week and playing festivals at the weekends)
- "Prince's Trust 2004" (Jim and Charlie were due to play 2 tracks (Belfast Child / Mandela Day) on 11 November 2004 at the Prince's Trust charity concert celebrating producer Trevor Horn's 25 years as a record producer alongside a line-up of other acts and musicians but due to an ear injury, Simple Minds had to cancel their appearance)

=== 2005 ===
- "Intimate Tour 2005" (19 July-2 December 2005; Europe Tour (including a UK leg)) (this tour was made of (20) intimate showcase events across Europe in which some songs from the forthcoming album Black & White 050505 were played by the band to media along with old ones; many of the shows were promoted and showcased by radio stations with set-lists up to 17 tracks at the very most)

=== 2006 ===
- "Black And White Tour" (30 January-28 August 2006; Europe & Australasia Tours) (many countries visited (including new ones): Ireland, UK (one leg), Belgium, the Netherlands, Norway, Sweden, Denmark, Germany (one leg), Austria, Yugoslavia, Switzerland, France, Spain, Luxembourg, Italy (one leg), Slovakia, Poland, Finland, Russia, Estonia, Lithuania, Slovenija, Croatia, Bosnia-Herzegovina, Macedonia, Greece, Hong Kong, Singapore, Australia & New Zealand (one leg); during the tour, Simple Minds played live every track from his new album Black & White 050505)

=== 2007 ===
- "Australian Tour 2007" (17 March-4 April 2007; Australia & New Zealand Tour) (surprise short tour (only 10 shows with an only 9-track set-list) with INXS and Arrested Development)
- "Lisbon Lions" (short appearance on 25 May 2007 at the Celtic Park, Glasgow, UK (only 5 tracks: 'Waterfront' / 'Don't You (Forget About Me)' / 'Dirty Old Town' / 'Sanctify Yourself' / 'Alive And Kicking') as part of a bigger show in honour of the Lisbon Lions, the Celtic team, on their 40th anniversary)

=== 2008 ===
- "Night of the Proms '08 Spring Dates" (18–26 April 2008)
- "46664 Nelson Mandela 90th Birthday Tribute" (short appearance on 27 June 2008 in Hyde Park, London, UK (only 2 tracks: 'Mandela Day' / 'Don't You (Forget About Me)') as part of a 3h-long show in honour of Nelson Mandela's 90 anniversary - "46664" is Nelson Mandela's AIDS charity)
- "Night of the Proms '08 Winter Dates" (24 October-22 November 2008)
- "Celebrate 30 Years Live (UK) Tour" (November–December 2008; UK Tour)

=== 2009 ===
- "Celebrate 30 Years Live European Tour" (May–September 2009; Europe Tour (including a UK leg))
- "Graffiti Soul Tour" (November–December 2009; Europe Tour (including a UK leg))

== 2010s tours ==
=== 2010 ===
- "Australian Tour 2010" (only 3 shows in March 2010 in Sydney, Melbourne & Auckland)
- "(Spring/Summer) Festival Tour 2010" (June–September 2010; mostly Europe Tour with 4 dates in Brazil in August 2010)
- "Final Shows 2010" (only 2 shows on 2 October 2010 in Glasgow, Scotland, UK & on 10 December 2010 in Bern, Switzerland)

=== 2011 ===
- "Night of the Proms 2011" (only one show on 2 April 2011 in Frederikshavn, Denmark; Simple Minds only played four songs: Sanctify Yourself + Alive And Kicking + Belfast Child + Don't You (Forget About Me))
- "Greatest Hits Forest Tour" (June–July 2011; UK Tour)
- "Greatest Hits +" Tour (June–August 2011; Europe Tour)
- "Australia 2011" (only one show on 22 October 2011 at the "600 Sounds" Festival in Gold Coast, Australia)

=== 2012 ===
- "5X5 Live" Tour (14 February–4 March 2012; Europe Tour; 16 shows)
- "(Spring/Summer) Festival Tour 2012" (30 March-7 September 2012 (26 shows); Europe Tour (including the first-time-ever appearance of Simple Minds at the T in the Park Scottish Festival, Kinross, Scotland, UK))
- "Australia Tour 2012" (29 November-15 December 2012; 9 shows)
- "Edinburgh's Hogmanay 20 years celebrations" (only one show on 31 December 2012: Simple Minds headlining "Concert in the Gardens" is celebrating the first 20 years of Edinburgh's Hogmanay (New Year's Eve) in Edinburgh, Scotland, UK)

=== 2013 ===
- "Greatest Hits + 2013":
  - UK Tour (25 March-4 May 2013; UK + Ireland tour; 30 shows (2 shows in Ireland + 28 shows in UK))
  - "Newmarket Racecourse" Show (only one show on 21 June 2013: Simple Minds opening the "Adnams Newmarket Nights" in Newmarket, Suffolk, England, UK)
  - "BBC Radio 2 Live in Hyde Park (a festival in a day)" (only one show on 8 September 2013 (1:10-2 pm); Simple Minds to play a special concert in Hyde Park, London for the BBC Radio 2)
  - Live in Brazil! (3 shows: on 5 October 2013 in Porto Alegre, on 8 October 2013 in São Paulo and 12 October 2013 in Curitiba, Brazil)
  - US & Canada Tour (15–24 October 2013; 7 shows [= Simple Minds' first North-American tour in more than 11 years])
  - "Private gig in Barcelona, Spain" (only one show on 29 October 2013 in Barcelona, Spain = Simple Minds' first time ever known private gig as a whole band; the band performed a dozen tracks: Main Set: Broken Glass Park / Waterfront + Once Upon A Time + All The Things She Said + See The Lights + Let The Day Begin + Neon Lights + Someone Somewhere in Summertime + Don't You (Forget About Me) + Sanctify Yourself + Alive And Kicking; Encore: Promised You A Miracle)
  - Live in South Africa! (3 shows: on 1 & 2 November 2013 in Johannesburg and 3 November 2013 in Cape Town, South Africa)
  - "Virgin Records 40th Anniversary Celebrations" (one full-length show on 7 November 2013 at Koko, Camden, London, UK)
  - Europe Tour (20–24 November 2013; Europe tour; 5 shows in the Netherlands (2 shows), Belgium (2 shows) and France (one show at Le Zénith, Paris))
  - UK Arena Shows (27–30 November 2013; 4 UK arena shows: in Glasgow (The Hydro), Manchester (Manchester Arena), Birmingham (National Indoor Arena) and London (The O2) with very special guests Ultravox; the complete show at the brand new Glasgow "Hydro" venue was recorded, filmed and released in May 2014 on DVD/CD as Celebrate – Live at the Glasgow SSE Hydro)
  - "Electroset Germany" (only 2 small German radio electroset gigs on 2 December 2013 at Oldie95, Hamburg & on 4 December 2013 at Studio SWR1, Mainz, Germany to promote the "Greatest Hits +" Tour of Germany due to start in February 2014)
  - "Open Air in the Square 2013" (only one show on 31 December 2013: Simple Minds to play a very special New Year's Eve concert at Main Square, Stonehaven, Scotland, UK)

=== 2014 ===
- "Greatest Hits + 2014":
  - Northern Europe (Winter) Tour (5 shows: on 26 January in Riga, Latvia, on 27 January 2014 in Helsinki, Finland, on 29 January at the Cirkus Arena, Stockholm, Sweden, on 30 January at the Sentrum Scene, Oslo, Norway & on 31 January 2014 at Vega, Copenhagen, Denmark)
  - Germany (Winter) Tour (01–23 February 2014 : extensive tour of Germany (16 shows))
  - Europe (Spring) Tour (7 shows: on 25 February 2014 at the Alcatraz, Milan, Italy, on 26 February 2014 at the Festhalle, Bern, Switzerland, on 28 February 2014 at the Incheba Arena, Prague, Czech Republic, on 1 March 2014 at Sala Ziemi, Poznań, Poland, on 2 March 2014 at Stodola, Warsaw, Poland, on 4 March 2014 at Dom Sportova, Zagreb, Croatia & on 6 March 2014 at SRC Kale, Skopje, Macedonia)
  - Europe (Summer) Tour leg#1 (15 shows: on 6 June 2014 at the "Montereau Confluences" Festival, Parc des Noues, Montereau-Fault-Yonne, Île-de-France, France (where two brand new songs, "Imagination" and "Blindfolded", had their live debut), on 7 June 2014 at the Retropop Festival, Emmen, Netherlands, on 9 June 2014 at the KulturPur Festival, Hilchenbach, Germany, on 13 June 2014 at the Bergen Festival, Bergen, Norway, on 20 June 2014 at En Lefko Festival, Athens, Greece, on 25 June 2014 at the "Jardins del Palau Reial de Pedralbes" Festival (Festival de Música de Barcelona), Palacio de Pedralbes, Barcelona, Spain, on 27 June 2014 at the Festival Estival (Free Festival), Parc du Vissoir, Trélazé (near Angers), France, on 28 June 2014 at the TW Classic Festival, Werchter, Belgium (Simple Minds onstage just prior to The Rolling Stones), on 5 July 2014 at the Cornbury Music Festival, Great Tew, Oxfordshire, England, UK, on 11 July 2014 at the Kunst!Rasen, Bonn, Germany, on 12 July 2014 at the Bospop Festival, Weert, Netherlands, on 14 July 2014 at the Place de l'Office du Tourisme, Morzine, France (free show), on 16 July 2014 at the Crazy Week festival, Nice, France, on 18 July 2014 at the Alive at Delapre (open air) Festival, Delapre Abbey, Northampton, UK, on 19 July 2014 at Kew the Music, Royal Botanic Gardens, Kew, London, UK) (the Benedikbeuern Open Air Festival in Germany where Simple Minds were due to play on 10 July 2014 has been cancelled due to unforeseen organisational and technical problems)
  - Italy (Summer) Tour (6 shows: on 24 July in Taormina, Sicily (Teatro Antico), 26 July in Molfetta (Banchina San Domenico), 27 July in Rome (The Cavea), 28 July in Ferrara (Piazza Castello), 29 July in Lignano (near Udine) (Arena Alpe Adria) & 30 July in Turin (Gru Village)
  - Europe (Summer) Tour leg#2 (12 shows: on 1 August 2014 at the Suikerrock Festival, Tienen, Belgium, on 2 August 2014 at Chris Evans' CarFest North at Oulton Park Racetrack, Little Budworth, Cheshire, England, on 7 August 2014 at the Smukfest Festival (Rytmescenen Scene), Skanderborg, Denmark (11:30 pm), on 8 August 2014 at Tivoli Gardens, Copenhagen, Denmark, on 10 August 2014 headlining the "Party at the Palace" Festival, Linlithgow Palace, Linlithgow, Scotland, UK, on 13 August 2014 at the Foire Aux Vins d'Alsace, Colmar, France (8 pm), on 16 August 2014 at Alnwick Castle, Northumberland, UK, on 22 August 2014 at the Parkenfestivalen, Rensåsparken, Bodo, Norway, on 29 August 2014 at the SummerDays Festival, Arbon, Switzerland, on 31 August 2014 at The Electric Picnic, Stradbally, County Laois, Ireland, on 4 September 2014 at the Zelt Festival, Bochum, Germany & on 12 September 2014 at Hardwick Hall hotel, Sedgefield, County Durham, England)

=== 2015 ===
- "Big Music Tour + Greatest Hits 2015":
  - Europe (Winter-Spring) Tour (7 February-4 May 2015; extensive Europe Tour (including two major Germany and UK legs and shows in Portugal, Spain, France, Switzerland, Luxembourg, Denmark, Sweden and Norway); 59 shows; from 4 April 2015 at The Spa, Bridlington, UK till 4 May 2015 at the Regent, Ipswich, UK (except on 22 April 2015 at the Nick Rayns LCR UEA, Norwich, UK), Simple Minds played "White Hot Day" (as the second set opener but only as an instrumental) for the first time since the show on 23 December 1983 at the Barrowland Ballroom, Glasgow, UK during the "Tour Du Monde 1983-1984", more than 31 years earlier)
  - Europe (Summer) Tour (4 shows: on 30 July 2015 at the Sporting Summer Fest, Sporting Club, Monte Carlo, Monaco, MC, on 5 August at the Heitere Open Air Festival, Zofingen, Switzerland, on 15 August at the Espace Marine, Lorient Interceltic Festival, Lorient, France & on 12 September at the Boomerang Festival, Hickstead, West Sussex, UK)
  - Europe (Fall) one-off charity concert (only one show: the "Save The Children's Child Refugee Crisis Appeal" show on 2 November 2015 at the Clyde Auditorium, Glasgow, Scotland, UK – performance only by Jim Kerr and Charlie Burchill)
  - Europe (Fall) Arena Tour (13 shows: on 14 November at the Forest National, Brussels, Belgium, on 15 November at the Lotto Arena, Antwerp, Belgium, on 17 November at the Barclaycard Arena, Hamburg, Germany, on 18 November at the Tempodrome, Berlin, Germany, on 20 November at Le Zénith, Paris, France, on 21 November at the Mediolanum Forum, Milan, Italy and 23 November at the Heineken Music Hall, Amsterdam, Netherlands, on 24 November at HMH, Amsterdam, Netherlands, on 26 November at The O2 Arena, London, UK, on 27 November at the First Direct Arena, Leeds, UK, on 28 November at the SSE Hydro, Glasgow, Scotland, UK, on 29 November at the 3Arena, Dublin, Ireland; on 1 December at the AECC, Aberdeen, Scotland, UK; The Stranglers joined Simple Minds as special guests on the 26, 27, 28, 29 November and 1 December 2015 arena shows)

=== 2016 ===
- "Big Music Tour + Greatest Hits 2016":
  - Middle East (Winter) Show (only 1 show: on 28 January at Duty Free Tennis Stadium, Dubai, United Arab Emirates; Simple Minds were ready to play on 29 January at the Qatar Masters (Doha Golf Club) in Qatar but have been precluded from doing so)
  - "Night of the Proms 2016" (2 shows: on 12 March at Atlas Arena, Łódź, Poland, and on 19 March at Friends Arena, Stockholm, Sweden)
  - Europe (Spring) Show (only 1 show: on 7 April 2016 at the "Zermatt Unplugged" Festival, Kirchplatz, Zermatt, Switzerland, their first unplugged gig ever)
  - Europe (Fall) Show (only 1 show: on 29 October 2016 at the "Zermatt Unplugged" Festival, Kaufleuten Klubsaal, Zürich, Switzerland, their second unplugged gig ever)
  - "Night of the Proms 2016" (17 shows: 24 November–18 December 2016 in Germany and Luxembourg; Jim and Charlie are due to perform a set of classic Simple Minds songs with a full orchestra as part of "Night of the Proms")

=== 2017 ===
- Australia & New Zealand (Winter) Tour (2–16 February 2017; 9 shows (with The B-52's): 7 shows in Australia and 2 shows in New Zealand)
- Acoustic Live '17 UK & Europe (Spring) Tour (8 April – 8 June 2017; 48 shows)

=== 2018 ===
- "Walk Between Worlds Tour":
  - "Europe (Winter) Tour" (13–20 February 2018; 7 shows at which the band performed Walk Between Worlds in its entirety; in Glasgow, UK (on 13 at Barrowland Ball); Manchester, UK (on 14 at Albert Hall); London, UK (on 15 at The Roundhouse); Paris, France (on 17 at Salle Pleyel); Brussels, Belgium (on 18 at Ancienne Belgique); Amsterdam, Netherlands (on 19 at Paradiso); Copenhagen, Denmark (on 20 at Vega))
  - "Europe (Spring–Summer) Tour" (5 May–1 August 2018; 28 shows in Croatia, UK, Montenegro, Switzerland, France, Spain, Italy, Belgium and Germany)
  - "European Grandslam UK (Summer) Tour" (29 July – 9 September 2018; 17 shows in the UK; from 29 July 2018 at Camp Bestival, Lulworth Castle, East Lulworth, Dorset, UK to 9 September 2018 at Slessor Gardens, Dundee, Scotland, UK; joint tour with The Pretenders; each band is due to perform a 90-minute set; support act for all the gigs is due to be KT Tunstall)
  - "US (Fall) Tour" (24 September–11 November 2018; 31 shows; the band played two full sets featuring classic songs spanning their whole career and including tracks from Walk Between Worlds)
  - "Australia (Fall) Show" (24 November 2018; unique Australian show; the band is headlining the Coates Hire Newcastle 500 at the No1 Sports Oval in Newcastle, New South Wales)

== 2020s tours ==
=== 2020 ===
- "40 Years Of Hits" World Tour 2020 (10 shows in total effectively performed (initially 81 shows); 3 countries in total (initially 18 countries); half a month in total (initially 11 months))
  - "Europe & UK (Winter~~–Spring~~) Tour" (28 February–(~~25 April)~~ 10 March; 10 shows (initially 42); Norway (4 shows); Sweden (4 shows); Denmark (2 shows on 10 March in Copenhagen, one at 7 pm and one at 10 pm (Note: Following the COVID-19 pandemic and advice from the Danish Health Authority regarding events with more than 1000 participants, Simple Minds shows in Copenhagen on Tuesday 10 March 2020 and Herning on Wednesday on 11 March 2020 had been rescheduled to 2 shows on each (same) day – one at 7pm and one at 10pm – until the announcement on 11 March of the cancellation of the 2 shows in Herning as the venue had closed until at least the end of March 2020.)) (except for the 2 shows in Herning cancelled but not yet (if ever) rescheduled, the other (30) shows have been cancelled and rescheduled to 2021 then also cancelled and rescheduled to 2022) (Note: The 30 shows cancelled and rescheduled to 2021 following the COVID-19 pandemic are: Switzerland (1 show postponed and rescheduled to March 2021); France (4 shows postponed and rescheduled to March 2021 (Note: Due to the COVID-19 pandemic that forbids in France all events above 1000 people, the 4 shows scheduled for early April in France (on 4 April at La Seine Musicale in Paris, on 6 at Arkéa Arena in Bordeaux, on 7 in at Halle Tony Garnier in Lyon, on 8 in Lille & on 8 in Lille had to be postponed and rescheduled to March 2021).)); the Netherlands (1 show in Amsterdam on 10 April postponed and rescheduled to early February 2021 (Note: Due to the COVID-19 pandemic and the Dutch government banning all events and concerts throughout the Netherlands until 1 June 2020, the show on 10 April 2020 at the Ziggo Dome had to be moved to 5 February 2021.)); Germany (15 dates from 16 March to 2 April postponed and rescheduled to February–March 2021 (Note: Following the COVID-19 pandemic and event cancellations imposed by the local health authorities of several German federal states, Simple Minds announced on 11 March 2020 the cancellation and reschedule in March 2021 of all their 15 shows from 14 March to 2 April 2020 in Germany.)); Belgium, Ireland and the United Kingdom (9 shows in these 3 countries from 11 to 25 April postponed and rescheduled to February 2021))
  - ~~"Europe & UK (Summer) Tour"~~ (~~19 June~~–~~7 August~~) (all the initially scheduled 32 shows have been cancelled: most of them have yet been rescheduled to 2021 (only 3 cancelled shows have not yet (if ever) been rescheduled: 2 shows in Spain (Note: The 2 shows initially scheduled in Spain: on 22 July 2020 in San Sebastian (at Heineken Jazzaldia) (free show) and 24 July 2020 in Valencia (at Jardines del Real).) and 1 show in France (Note: The show initially scheduled in France on 8 August 2020 in Orange (Théatre Antique).)) then also cancelled and rescheduled to 2022) (Note: Following the COVID-19 pandemic, the show on 19 June at Nocturne Live, Blenheim Palace, Oxfordshire, UK has been cancelled and rescheduled to 18 June 2021; the 2 shows in Portugal (in Porto and in Lisbon) due to take place in June 2020 have been rescheduled to June 2021; the show on 25 June 2020 in Madrid (at WiZink Center) has been rescheduled to 24 June 2021; the show on 29 June 2020 in Luxembourg (at Rockhal) has been rescheduled to 28 June 2021; the show on 30 June 2020 at Salle Metropole in Lausanne, Switzerland has been postponed and rescheduled to 29 June 2021; the 5 shows due to take place in Italy in Summer 2020 in Pistoia, Rome, Pescara, Taormina and Verona have been cancelled and rescheduled to summer 2021; the 5 shows due to take place in France in Summer 2020 have been cancelled (in particular, the show on 8 August 2020 in Orange (Théatre Antique) and the 2 festival shows on 4 July in Belfort (Festival Les Eurockéennes) and on 8 July in Argelès-sur-Mer (Festival Les Déferlantes) following the cancellation of the festivals); yet 4 (out of the 5 initial) shows in France (in Tilloloy, Argelès-sur-Mer, Cognac and Belfort) have been rescheduled to Summer 2021; the show in Croatia on 13 July 2020 has been postponed and rescheduled to 6 July 2021; the show on 25 July 2020 in Sant Feliu de Guíxols, Spain (at Festival De Porta Ferrada) has been rescheduled to 24 July 2021; the show on 31 July 2020 in Marbella, Spain (at Starlite Marbella) has been rescheduled on 31 July 2021; the show on 1 August 2020 in Jerez de la Frontera, Spain (at Tio Pepe Festival) has been rescheduled to 30 July 2021; the special dinner show on 7 August 2020 in Monte Carlo, Monaco (at Monte Carlo Summer Sporting Festival) has been cancelled and rescheduled to 23 July 2021; the 7 shows in the United Kingdom from 13 to 23 August 2020 (including on 18 August 2020 at Edinburgh Summer Sessions in Princes Street Gardens, Scotland and on 23 August 2020 at Custom House Square in Belfast, Northern Ireland) have been rescheduled from 12 to 23 August 2021. The ~~(7)~~ 6 new 2021 dates are: ~~12 August in Liverpool at M&S Bank Arena,~~ 15 August in Edinburgh at Summer Sessions, 17 August in Aberdeen at P&J Live, 19 August in Hull at Bonus Arena, 20 August in Newcastle at Utilita Arena, 21 August in Nottingham at Motorpoint Arena, 23 August in Belfast at Custom House Square.)
  - ~~"Australia & New Zealand (Fall) Tour"~~ (~~26 November–12 December~~; 2 countries) (all the initially scheduled 9 shows have been cancelled and rescheduled to December 2021 then also cancelled and rescheduled to 2022)

=== 2021 ===
- "40 Years Of Hits" World Tour 2021 (Rescheduled dates (mostly) – (~~48 shows in total~~) (all shows cancelled and rescheduled to March–August 2022)
  - "Europe & UK (Winter–Summer) Tour" ~~(5 February–23 August replaced with 21 June–5 September 2021~~; ~~39 shows in total~~; ~~13 countries~~; ~~7 months~~ ) ~~(20 rescheduled shows (from 2020) have once again been cancelled and rescheduled, this time to March 2022: the 15 shows in Germany (from 28 February to 20 March 2021), the stand-alone show in Switzerland on 3 March 2021, and the 4 shows in France in March 2021 (Note: 4 shows (from Spring 2020) rescheduled in March 2021: on 22 March in Lille, on 23 March in Paris (at La Seine Musicale), on 24 March in Bordeaux, on 26 March in Lyon.)); (the (rescheduled) show (from 2020) on 18 June 2021 at Nocturne Live festival in Blenheim Palace, UK has also been cancelled and rescheduled, this time to 18 June 2022~~;
    - ~~2 (rescheduled) shows in Portugal on 21 June 2021 in Porto, Coliseum and on 22 June 2021 in Lisbon, Campo Pequeno (from June 2020);~~
    - ~~4 (rescheduled) shows (from Summer 2020) in France in June & July 2021 (from 27 June to 10 July 2021) (Note: 4 (rescheduled) shows (from Summer 2020): on 27 June 2021 (at Rétro C Trop festival) in Tilloloy, on 3 July 2021 (at Les Eurockéennes Festival in Belfort, on 8 July 2021 (Festival Les Déferlantes) in Argelès-sur-Mer and on 10 July 2021 (at Blues Passions Fest) in Cognac.);~~
    - ~~1 (rescheduled) show (from 29 June 2020) in Luxembourg (at Rockhal) on 28 June 2021;~~
    - ~~1 (rescheduled) show (from 30 June 2020) at Salle Metropole in Lausanne, Switzerland on 29 June 2021;~~
    - ~~1 (rescheduled) show (from Summer 2020) on 1 July 2021 in Pistoia, Italy (Pistoia Blues),~~
    - ~~1 show on 9 July 2021 in Aix-les-Bains, France (at Festival Musilac) (Note: Completely new (2021) date and location.);~~
    - ~~1 show on 11 July 2021 in Albi, France (at Pause Guitare Festival) (Note: Completely new (2021) date and location.);~~
    - ~~4 shows in Italy on 13 July in Rome (Auditorium Parco della Musica), on 15 July in Pescara (Teatro D’Annunzio), on 17 July in Taormina (Teatro Antico), on 9 August in Verona, (Arena di Verona);~~
    - ~~1 (rescheduled) show in Croatia (from July 2020) on 6 July 2021;~~
    - ~~2 (rescheduled) shows in Spain (from 25 June & 25 July 2020) on 24 June 2021 in Madrid (at WiZink Center) and 1 show on 24 July 2021 in Sant Feliu de Guíxols (at Festival De Porta Ferrada);~~
    - ~~1 special (rescheduled) dinner show (from 7 August 2020) on 23 July 2021 Monte Carlo, Monaco (at the Sporting Summer Festival);~~
    - ~~1 (rescheduled) show in Spain (from August 2020) on 30 July 2021 in Jerez de la Frontera (at Tio Pepe Festival);~~
    - ~~1 (rescheduled) show in Spain (from July 2020) on 31 July 2021 in Marbella (at Starlite Marbella);~~
    - (~~7~~) 6 shows in the United Kingdom (initially from 13 to 23 August 2020) rescheduled from ~~12~~ 15 to 23 August 2021 (Note: The (~~7~~) 6 new 2021 UK dates are ~~12 August in Liverpool at M&S Bank Arena,~~ 15 August in Edinburgh at Summer Sessions, 17 August in Aberdeen at P&J Live, 19 August in Hull at Bonus Arena, 20 August in Newcastle at Utilita Arena, 21 August in Nottingham at Motorpoint Arena, 23 August in Belfast at Custom House Square.);
    - ~~8 shows in the United Kingdom from 12 August to 2 September (Note: In London (on 12), Cardiff (on 24), Birmingham (on 27), Leeds (on 28), Glasgow (on 29), Liverpool (on 31), Bournemouth (on 1 September), Brighton (on 2 September) (i.e. 7 shows rescheduled from 9 to 20 February 2021 AND an 8th show in Liverpool rescheduled from 12 August 2021).);~~
    - ~~1 show in Dublin, Ireland on 24 August (rescheduled from 22 February);~~
    - ~~1 show in Amsterdam, Netherlands on 4 September at the Ziggo Dome (rescheduled from 5 February 2021);~~
    - ~~1 show in Antwerp, Belgium (at Sportpaleis) on 5 September (rescheduled from 6 February 2021); (Note: 1 show in Amsterdam, Netherlands on 5 February at the Ziggo Dome rescheduled to 4 September; 1 show in Antwerp, Belgium (at Sportpaleis) on 6 February rescheduled to 5 September; 7 shows in the United Kingdom from 9 to 20 February 2021 rescheduled to August and September 2021: from 12 August to 2 September 2021 in London, Cardiff, Birmingham, Leeds, Glasgow, Bournemouth, Brighton... AND a 8th show from 12 August 2021 in Liverpool (at M&S Bank Arena) rescheduled to 31 August 2021; 1 show in Dublin, Ireland on 22 February rescheduled to 24 August) – "The frustration of having to reschedule these live shows a second time is huge. We are determined to make even more effort for you all once these shows can go ahead. In the meantime we ask all of you to keep your tickets - and keep the faith! We guarantee our live shows will be worth the extra wait... Thanks to you all." Jim Kerr.)~~
  - "Australia & New Zealand (Fall) Tour" ~~(2–18 December 2021; 2 countries; 9 shows rescheduled from November–December 2020)~~ (all shows cancelled by promoter after continued uncertainty over travel restrictions)

=== 2022 ===
- "40 Years Of Hits" UK & Europe (Spring–Summer) Tour 2022 (~~4–29 March 2022~~ + 18 June 2022 – 31 March–26 August 2022; (~~21~~) 80 shows; (~~4~~) 16 countries; (~~1~~) 5 months) (The only rescheduled date (from 2020 and 2021) preserved in 2022 was on 18 June 2022 at Nocturne Live festival in Blenheim Palace, UK)
  - ~~20 rescheduled shows (from 2020 and 2021) 4–29 March 2022; 15 shows in Germany (from 4 to 29 March 2022); 4 shows in France (from 7 to 16 March 2022) (Note: 4 (rescheduled) shows (from Spring 2020 & Spring 2021) in March 2022: on 7 March in Lille, on 8 March in Paris (at La Seine Musicale), on 9 March in Bordeaux, on 16 March in Lyon.); a stand-alone show in Switzerland (in Zürich) on 25 March 2022;~~
  - "UK (Spring) Tour" (31 March–16 April 2022; 12 shows; 1 country; half a month)
  - "Europe (Spring–Summer) Tour" (17 April–26 August 2022; 68 shows; 15 countries; 4 months+)

=== 2024 ===
- Global Tour 2024
  - "Australia & New Zealand (Winter) Tour" (12 shows from 27 January to 21 February + a show at Coca-Cola Arena in Dubai on 27 February)
  - "Europe & UK (Spring) Tour" (54 shows from 15 March to 4 August)

=== 2025 ===
- Global Tour 2025 - Summer Live 2025 (51 shows)
  - 5 summer shows in South & North Americas (April 29: Santiago, Chile, Movistar Arena + May 1: Buenos Aires, Argentina, Movistar Arena + May 3: Rio de Janeiro, Brazil, Qualistage + May 4: São Paulo, Brazil, Espaco Unimed + May 7: Mexico City, Mexico, Arena Ciudad de Mexico)
  - 24 shows in North America re-titled Alive & Kicking Tour: North America 2025 (with special guests Soft Cell and Modern English)
    - May 2025 (16: Ridgefield, WA + 17: Seattle, WA + 20: Concord, CA + 22: Los Angeles, CA + 23: Greater Palm Springs, CA + 24: Chula Vista, CA + 25: Phoenix, AZ + 27: Denver, CO + 30: Austin, TX + 31: Houston, TX)
    - June 2025 (1: Dallas, TX + 4: Rogers, AR + 5: St. Louis, MO + 7: Atlanta, GA + 10: Columbia, MD + 11: Holmdel, NJ + 13: Wantagh, NY + 14: Philadelphia, PA + 15: Boston, MA + 17: Montreal, QC + 18: Toronto, ON + 20: Chicago, IL + 21: Detroit, MI + 22: Noblesville, IN)
  - 8 summer shows in the UK & Ireland
    - June 2025 (Friday 27: Glasgow, UK, Bellahouston Park + Saturday 28: Lincoln, UK, Lincoln Castle + Sunday 29: Southampton, UK, Southampton Summer Sessions)
    - July 2025 (Tuesday 1: Dublin, Ireland, Trinity Summer Series + Thursday 3: Bedford, UK, Bedford Summer Sessions + Sunday 6: Lytham St Annes, UK, Lytham Festival + Monday 7: Halifax, UK, Live At The Piece Hall + Tuesday 8: Derby, UK, Derby Summer Sessions)
  - 14 summer shows in Europe
    - July 2025 (4: Rotselaar, Belgium, Rock Werchter + 11: Mönchengladbach, Germany, SparkassenPark + 12: Weert, The Netherlands, Bospop + 13: St. Goarshausen, Germany, Loreley Open Air + 15: Verona, Italy, Arena di Verona + 16: Saint Julien en Genevoix, France, Guitare en Scène + 18: Calella de Palafrugell, Spain, Cap Roig Festival + 19: Murcia, Spain, Murcia On Festival + 20: Valencia, Spain, Conciertos de Viveros + 22: Nyon, Switzerland, Paléo Festival + 23: Toulon, France, Festival Le Son by Toulon + 24: Lucca, Italy, Summer Festival Lucca + 26&27: Taormina, Italy, Teatro Antico di Taormina)

=== 2026 ===
- US One-night event – 2026 (1 show)
  - North America (November 14, 2026 – Dark Waves festival in Huntington Beach, California)

=== 2027 ===
- V Tour 2027 (subtitled Celebrating 5 decades of music) (37 shows)
  - Australia & New Zealand (8 shows featuring very special guest Gary Numan) (13 February-1 March) (13 February – Perth, RAC Arena; 16 February – Adelaide, AEC Arena; 18 February – Melbourne, Rod Laver Arena; 20 February – Sydney, Qudos Bank Arena; 21 February – Brisbane, Brisbane Entertainment Centre; 25 February – Auckland, Spark Arena; 27 February – Wellington, TSB Arena; 1 March – Christchurch, Wolfbrook Arena)
  - UK, Ireland & Europe (29 shows featuring very special guests Level 42 in Europe and Gary Numan in the UK and Ireland) (5 April-17 May) (5 April – Porto, Super Bock Arena, Portugal; 6 April – Lisbon, Sagres Campo Pequeno, Portugal; 7 April – Madrid, Movistar Arena, Spain; 9 April – Lyon, LDLC Arena, France; 10 April – Paris, Accor Arena, France; 11 April – Amnéville, Le Galaxie, France; 13 April – Nantes, Zénith, France; 14 April – Bordeaux, Arkea Arena, France; 16 April – Milan, Unipol Forum, Italy; 17 April – Bologna, Unipol Arena, Italy; 19 April – Zurich, Hallenstadion, Switzerland; 20 April – Munich, Olympiahalle, Germany; 21 April – Berlin, Uber Arena, Germany; 23 April – Oslo, Spektrum, Norway; 24 April – Copenhagen, Royal Arena, Denmark; 25 April – Stockholm, Avicii Arena, Sweden; 27 April – Hamburg, Barclays Arena, Germany; 28 April – Cologne, Lanxess Arena, Germany; 30 April & 01 May – Amsterdam, Ziggo Dome, Netherlands; 06 May – London, The O2 Arena, UK; 07 May – Manchester, Co-op Live Arena, UK; 08 May – Birmingham, Utilita Arena, UK; 10 May – Nottingham, Motorpoint Arena, UK; 11 May – Leeds, First Direct Arena, UK; 13 May – Newcastle upon Tyne, Utilita Arena, UK; 14 & 15 May – Glasgow, OVO Hydro, UK; 17 May – Dublin, 3Arena, Ireland)
  - USA (tour dates to be announced soon)
