= The Best of Simple Minds =

Greatest hits album by Simple Minds
- Released: 5 November 2001
- Label: Virgin

Simple Minds chronology
Neon Lights (2001)	The Best of Simple Minds (2001)	Cry (2002)

Night of the Proms edition
- Cover of the Night of the Proms edition

Professional ratings
Review scores
Source	Rating
AllMusic	4/5 stars
Martin C. Strong	8/10
Q	3/5 stars
Uncut	3.5/5 stars

The Best of Simple Minds is the second greatest hits album by Simple Minds, released in 2001. New versions of the "Theme for Great Cities" were released, and some copies (such as the US version), included the remixes by Raven Maize.

A new edition was released in November 2007 with an extra DVD of the Verona concert film.

Raven Maize's track "The Real Life"—which samples both Simple Minds' "Theme for Great Cities" and Queen's "Bohemian Rhapsody"—was a hit single in 2001 and was included on this album, at the end of the second disc.

== Track listing ==
Disc one

1. "Don't You (Forget About Me)" – 4:20
2. "Promised You a Miracle" (edit) – 3:59
3. "Waterfront" – 4:49
4. "Alive and Kicking" – 5:24
5. "Glittering Prize" (edit) – 3:58
6. "All the Things She Said" – 4:16
7. "Sanctify Yourself" – 5:00
8. "Someone Somewhere in Summertime" – 4:38
9. "Ghost Dancing" – 4:46
10. "Up on the Catwalk" (edit) – 4:04
11. "Speed Your Love to Me" (edit) – 3:59
12. "Theme for Great Cities" – 5:50
13. "Love Song" (edit) – 3:54
14. "The American" (edit) – 3:32
15. "Sweat in Bullet" – 4:30
16. "Life in a Day" – 4:00
17. "I Travel" – 3:56

Disc two

1. "Let There Be Love" (extended album mix) – 5:14
2. "This Is Your Land" (DJ version) – 5:05
3. "Kick It In" (edit) – 4:20
4. "Let It All Come Down" (edit) – 3:37
5. "See the Lights" – 4:22
6. "Stand by Love" – 4:04
7. "Real Life" (video mix) – 4:53
8. "She's a River" (edit) – 4:29
9. "Hypnotised" (edit) – 4:46
10. "Glitterball" (edit) – 4:25
11. "War Babies" (edit) – 4:24
12. "Mandela Day" – 5:41
13. "Biko" – 7:32
14. "Belfast Child" – 6:40
15. "The Real Life" (Raven Maize remix) – 2:55

=== Night of the Proms edition ===
Virgin Records released this compilation on 1 October 2002; it is identical to The Best of Simple Minds except it deletes "The Real Life" remix and replaces it with "Cry" (3:55) and "Spaceface" (3:52).

=== Special edition DVD: Live in Verona ===
1. "Theme for Great Cities '90"
2. "When Spirits Rise"
3. "Street Fighting Years"
4. "Let It All Come Down" (promotional video)
5. "Mandela Day"
6. "Waterfront"
7. "This Is Your Land" (instrumental segue)
8. "Don't You Forget About Me"
9. "Gaelic Melody" (instrumental segue)
10. "Kick It In"
11. "Ghost Dancing"
12. "Soul Crying Out" (instrumental segue)
13. "Belfast Child"
14. "Sanctify Yourself"
15. "East at Easter"
16. "Alive & Kicking"
17. "Let It All Come Down" (instrumental end titles)
18. "Hunter & the Hunted" (recorded live at the Newcastle City Hall, 20.11.82)
19. "Glittering Prize" (recorded live at the Newcastle City Hall, 20.11.82)
20. "Someone Somewhere in Summertime" (recorded live at the Newcastle City Hall, 20.11.82)
21. "The American" [Recorded Live at the Newcastle City Hall, 20.11.82]
22. "Big Sleep" [Recorded Live at the Newcastle City Hall, 20.11.82]
23. "New Gold Dream" [Recorded Live at the Newcastle City Hall, 20.11.82]

== Charts ==
=== Weekly charts ===
Chart (2001–2002)	Peak position
Belgian Albums (Ultratop Flanders)	19
Belgian Albums (Ultratop Wallonia)	39
Danish Albums (Hitlisten)	9
Dutch Albums (Album Top 100)	11
French Albums (SNEP)	10
German Albums (Offizielle Top 100)	67
Irish Albums (IRMA)	40
Italian Albums (FIMI)	44
New Zealand Albums (RMNZ)	39
Scottish Albums (Official Charts)	13
Swiss Albums (Schweizer Hitparade)	64
UK Albums (Official Charts)	34

=== Year-end charts ===
Chart (2002)	Position
Belgian Albums (Ultratop Flanders)	92
Dutch Albums (Album Top 100)	77

== Certifications ==
Region	Certification	Certified units/sales
Belgium (BRMA)	Platinum	50,000^{*}
Italy (FIMI)	Gold	30,000^{*}
Netherlands (NVPI)	Gold	40,000^{^}
United Kingdom (BPI)	Gold	100,000^{^}
^{*} Sales figures based on certification alone.^{^} Shipments figures based on certification alone.
