= Floating World =

Floating World may refer to:

- Ukiyo ("floating, fleeting, or transient world"), the urban lifestyle, especially the pleasure-seeking aspects, of Edo-period Japan (1600–1867)
- Floating World (Anathallo album), 2006
- Floating World (Jade Warrior album), 1974
- "The Floating World", a song by Soft Machine, from the album Bundles
- "The Floating World", an instrumental by Simple Minds, from the album Cry
- The Floating World Tour, a 2002 music tour by Simple Minds

== See also ==
- An Artist of the Floating World, a 1986 novel by Kazuo Ishiguro
