= Silver Box =

Box set by Simple Minds
- Released: 18 October 2004
- Recorded: 1979–1995, 1999
- Genre: Rock
- Length: 5:18:29
- Label: Virgin

Simple Minds chronology
| Cry (2002) | Silver Box (2004) | Black & White 050505 (2005) |

Simple Minds alternate chronology
| Real Live 91 (1998) | Our Secrets Are the Same (2000/2004) | Neon Lights (2001) |

Simple Minds studio albums chronology
| Néapolis (1998) | Our Secrets Are the Same (2000/2004) | Cry (2002) |

Our Secrets Are the Same
- Unused cover artwork

Professional ratings
Review scores
| Source | Rating |
|---|---|
| The Guardian | 4/5 stars |
| Martin C. Strong | (6/10) |
| NME | (mixed) |
| Uncut | 3/5 stars |

Silver Box is a 5-CD box set of demos, radio sessions and live recordings by the Scottish rock band Simple Minds, released in October 2004, which also includes Our Secrets Are the Same (as disc 5), the band's long-delayed studio album which would have been their twelfth studio album of original material, had it been released in 1999/2000.

== Overview ==
The 5-CD box set Silver Box is mostly made up of previously unreleased demos, BBC sessions and various live recordings from 1979 to 1995. As a final bonus disc, it also includes Our Secrets Are the Same, a genuine studio album of original material. Recorded between April and June 1999 and originally planned to be released on its own in late 1999 / early 2000, Our Secrets Are the Same was delayed many times and ultimately cancelled until its final inclusion in the box set.

== Critical reception ==
The few professional reviews the compilation received commented on the previously elusive album Our Secrets Are The Same positively. Adam Sweeting, writing for The Guardian newspaper, opined, "The album, dating from 1999, was scuppered by legal wranglings, but it's some of the best music the band have made in 20 years. Tracks such as "Death by Chocolate" or "Happy Is the Man" recall something of their old pioneering spirit, and show a fascination with the process of recording rather than with prancing about in front of a sea of cigarette lighters." He dismissed most of the third and fourth discs as evidence of the band's progression into "overblown" stadium rock, but admitted: "If you chucked out most of discs three and four from this beefy five-disc box, you'd be left with some fascinating insights and lost nuggets from the past and near-present of Simple Minds. Rob Fitzpatrick writing for the NME agreed, saying, "By CD3, "Waterfront" – a neat throb of a single – is bloated into ten-plus minutes of pointless noodling and "Ghost Dancing" is so clearly similar in sound to U2's "The Unforgettable Fire" it's embarrassing. By CD4 it's time for "Belfast Child". God no! Miraculously, though, CD5 the band's 1999 'lost' album has some really good music on it in fact it's a lost gem that some fans have never heard or even know about.

Uncut meanwhile admitted that the new album would be the main source of interest, but thought that the music still owed much to U2, writing, "It finds Kerr and Burchill still a bit in the slipstream of '90s U2 – tastefully epic, techno-fringed and extravagantly exasperated ("Death By Chocolate" and "Neon Cowboys") with the wickedness of a world gone wrong." Martin C. Strong meanwhile, in The Essential Rock Discography, complimented the band's new music: "The album's savvy pop smarts harked back to their early 80s purple period, only underlining the shortcomings of Néapolis, while the sassy momentum of "Jeweller to the Stars" could've easily regenerated Kerr and Co's contemporary credibility."

== Track listing ==
Adapted from the box set liner notes.

Silver Box (November/2004. Virgin Records)

=== Disc 1 ===
| No. | Title | Writer(s) | Length |
|---|---|---|---|
| 1. | "Life in a Day" (BBC in Concert, live at Paris Theatre, London, 8 August 1979) | Jim Kerr, Charlie Burchill | 4:09 |
| 2. | "Chelsea Girl" (BBC in Concert, live at Paris Theatre, London, 8 August 1979) | Kerr, Burchill | 5:08 |
| 3. | "Here Comes the Fool" (BBC in Concert, live at Paris Theatre, London, 8 August 1979) | Kerr, Burchill, Mick MacNeil, Derek Forbes, Brian McGee | 4:45 |
| 4. | "Changeling" (John Peel Session, Maida Vale Studios, London, 19 December 1979) | Kerr, Burchill, MacNeil, Forbes, McGee | 4:00 |
| 5. | "Premonition" (John Peel Session, Maida Vale Studios, London, 19 December 1979) | Kerr, Burchill, MacNeil, Forbes, McGee | 5:34 |
| 6. | "Citizen (Dance of Youth)" (John Peel Session, Maida Vale Studios, London, 19 December 1979) | Kerr, Burchill, MacNeil, Forbes, McGee | 2:57 |
| 7. | "Room" (John Peel Session, Maida Vale Studios, London, 19 December 1979) | Kerr, Burchill, MacNeil, Forbes, McGee | 4:22 |
| 8. | "I Travel" (Demo, early/mid 1980) | Kerr, Burchill, MacNeil, Forbes, McGee | 3:49 |
| 9. | "Celebrate" (Demo, early/mid 1980) | Kerr, Burchill, MacNeil, Forbes, McGee | 4:24 |
| 10. | "Thirty Frames a Second" (Demo, early/mid 1980) | Kerr, Burchill, MacNeil, Forbes, McGee | 5:24 |
| 11. | "Twist/Run/Repulsion" (Demo, early/mid 1980) | Kerr, Burchill, MacNeil, Forbes, McGee | 4:08 |
| 12. | "Capital City" (Demo, early/mid 1980) | Kerr, Burchill, MacNeil, Forbes, McGee | 5:33 |
| 13. | "New Warm Skin" (Demo, early/mid 1980) | Kerr, Burchill, MacNeil, Forbes, McGee | 4:19 |
| 14. | "Constantinople Line" (Demo, early/mid 1980) | Kerr, Burchill, MacNeil, Forbes, McGee | 4:40 |
| 15. | "Careful in Career" (Demo, January 1981) | Kerr, Burchill, MacNeil, Forbes, McGee | 6:33 |

=== Disc 2 ===
| No. | Title | Writer(s) | Length |
|---|---|---|---|
| 1. | "The American" (Demo, January 1981) | Kerr, Burchill, MacNeil, Forbes, McGee | 3:59 |
| 2. | "Life in Oils" (Demo, January 1981) | Kerr, Burchill, MacNeil, Forbes, McGee | 4:13 |
| 3. | "Sweat in Bullet" (Demo, January 1981) | Kerr, Burchill, MacNeil, Forbes, McGee | 4:28 |
| 4. | "Love Song" (Demo, January 1981) | Kerr, Burchill, MacNeil, Forbes, McGee | 4:59 |
| 5. | "Promised You a Miracle" (David Jensen Session, Maida Vale Studios, London, 11 February 1982) | Kerr, Burchill, MacNeil, Forbes | 4:25 |
| 6. | "In Trance as Mission" (David Jensen Session, Maida Vale Studios, London, 11 February 1982) | Kerr, Burchill, MacNeil, Forbes, McGee | 4:30 |
| 7. | "Someone Somewhere in Summertime" (David Jensen Session, Maida Vale Studios, London, 26 August 1982) | Kerr, Burchill, MacNeil, Forbes | 5:10 |
| 8. | "Glittering Prize" (David Jensen Session, Maida Vale Studios, London, 26 August 1982) | Kerr, Burchill, MacNeil, Forbes | 4:21 |
| 9. | "Hunter & the Hunted" (David Jensen Session, Maida Vale Studios, London, 26 August 1982) | Kerr, Burchill, MacNeil, Forbes | 5:53 |
| 10. | "The Kick Inside of Me" (David Jensen Session, Maida Vale Studios, London, 11 September 1983) | Kerr, Burchill, MacNeil, Forbes, Mel Gaynor | 5:36 |
| 11. | "New Gold Dream" (Includes excerpts from "Take Me to the River" and "Light My Fire") (Live at Barrowlands Ballroom, Glasgow, 5 January 1985) | Kerr, Burchill, MacNeil, Forbes / Al Green, Mabon Hodges / Jim Morrison, Robby Krieger, John Densmore, Ray Manzarek | 12:33 |
| 12. | "Don't You (Forget about Me)" (Live Aid rehearsal, Philadelphia, Pennsylvania, 10 July 1985) | Keith Forsey, Steve Schiff | 7:14 |

=== Disc 3 ===
| No. | Title | Writer(s) | Length |
|---|---|---|---|
| 1. | "Waterfront" (Live at The Ahoy, Rotterdam, 3 December 1985) | Kerr, Burchill, MacNeil, Forbes, Gaynor | 10:34 |
| 2. | "Ghost Dancing" (Live at The Ahoy, Rotterdam, 3 December 1985) | Kerr, Burchill, MacNeil | 7:32 |
| 3. | "Book of Brilliant Things" (Live at The Ahoy, Rotterdam, 3 December 1985) | Kerr, Burchill, MacNeil, Forbes, Gaynor | 6:44 |
| 4. | "Once Upon a Time" (Live at The Ahoy, Rotterdam, 3 December 1985) | Kerr, Burchill, MacNeil | 7:13 |
| 5. | "All the Things She Said" (Live at The Ahoy, Rotterdam, 3 December 1985) | Kerr, Burchill, MacNeil | 5:28 |
| 6. | "Alive and Kicking" (Live at The Ahoy, Rotterdam, 3 December 1985) | Kerr, Burchill, MacNeil | 7:24 |
| 7. | "Sanctify Yourself" (Live at The Ahoy, Rotterdam, 3 December 1985) | Kerr, Burchill, MacNeil | 5:30 |
| 8. | "Mandela Day" (Live at Wembley Stadium, London, 11 June 1988) | Kerr, Burchill, MacNeil | 6:06 |
| 9. | "Real Life" (Live at Barrowlands Ballroom, Glasgow, 13 August 1991) | Kerr, Burchill | 6:44 |
| 10. | "See the Lights" (Live at Barrowlands Ballroom, Glasgow, 13 August 1991) | Kerr, Burchill | 5:29 |

=== Disc 4 ===
| No. | Title | Writer(s) | Length |
|---|---|---|---|
| 1. | "Travelling Man" (Live at Barrowlands Ballroom, Glasgow, 13 August 1991) | Kerr, Burchill, Stephen Lipson | 5:18 |
| 2. | "East at Easter" (Live at Barrowlands Ballroom, Glasgow, 13 August 1991) | Kerr, Burchill, MacNeil, Forbes, Gaynor | 4:15 |
| 3. | "Banging on the Door" (Live at Barrowlands Ballroom, Glasgow, 13 August 1991) | Kerr, Burchill | 5:45 |
| 4. | "Stand by Love" (Live at Barrowlands Ballroom, Glasgow, 13 August 1991) | Kerr, Burchill | 4:28 |
| 5. | "Oh Jungleland" (Live at Barrowlands Ballroom, Glasgow, 13 August 1991) | Kerr, Burchill, MacNeil | 6:44 |
| 6. | "King Is White & in the Crowd" (Live at Barrowlands Ballroom, Glasgow, 13 August 1991) | Kerr, Burchill, MacNeil, Forbes | 4:17 |
| 7. | "Big Sleep" (Live at Barrowlands Ballroom, Glasgow, 13 August 1991) | Kerr, Burchill, MacNeil, Forbes | 5:18 |
| 8. | "Let There Be Love" (Live at Barrowlands Ballroom, Glasgow, 13 August 1991) | Kerr, Burchill | 5:38 |
| 9. | "Ghostrider" (Live at Barrowlands Ballroom, Glasgow, 13 August 1991) | Kerr, Burchill | 4:05 |
| 10. | "Belfast Child" (Live at Barrowlands Ballroom, Glasgow, 13 August 1991) | Traditional, Kerr, Burchill, MacNeil | 9:02 |
| 11. | "She's a River" (Live at the Royal Concert Hall, Glasgow, 10 September 1995) | Kerr, Burchill | 6:11 |
| 12. | "Up on the Catwalk" (Live at the Royal Concert Hall, Glasgow, 10 September 1995) | Kerr, Burchill, MacNeil, Forbes, Gaynor | 4:46 |
| 13. | "Hypnotised" (Live at the Royal Concert Hall, Glasgow, 10 September 1995) | Kerr, Burchill | 7:00 |

=== Disc 5: Our Secrets Are the Same ===
(planned twelfth studio album of original material)
| No. | Title | Writer(s) | Length |
|---|---|---|---|
| 1. | "Swimming Towards the Sun" | Kevin Hunter, Kathleen Stevens | 4:33 |
| 2. | "Jeweller to the Stars" | Kerr, Burchill, Hunter | 3:28 |
| 3. | "Space" | Kerr, Burchill, Hunter | 4:16 |
| 4. | "Death by Chocolate" | Kerr, Burchill, Hunter | 3:36 |
| 5. | "Waiting at the End of the World" | Kerr, Burchill, Hunter | 3:26 |
| 6. | "Neon Cowboys" | Kerr, Burchill, Hunter | 3:52 |
| 7. | "She Knows" | Kerr, Burchill, Hunter | 4:07 |
| 8. | "Hello" | Kerr, Burchill, Hunter | 3:23 |
| 9. | "Happy Is the Man" | Mark Kerr | 4:23 |
| 10. | "Sleeping" | Kerr, Burchill, Hunter | 4:32 |

== Personnel ==
Credits adapted from the box set liner notes, except where noted.

Musicians

- Jim Kerr – vocals
- Charlie Burchill – guitar
- Mick MacNeil – keyboards (disc 1; disc 2; disc 3: 1–8)
- Derek Forbes – bass (disc 1; disc 2: 1–11)
- Brian McGee – drums (disc 1; disc 2: 1–4)
- Kenny Hyslop – drums (disc 2: 5, 6)
- Mike Ogletree – drums (disc 2: 7–9)
- Mel Gaynor – drums (disc 2: 10–12; disc 3: disc 4: 1–10)
- John Giblin – bass (disc 2: 12; disc 3: 1–8)
- Robin Clark – vocals (disc 3: 4–7)
- Sue Hadjopoulos – percussion (disc 3: 1–7)
- Malcolm Foster – bass (disc 3: 9,10; disc 4)
- Mark Taylor – keyboards (disc 3: 9,10; disc 4)
- Mark Schulman – drums (disc 4: 11–13)
- Bono – vocals (disc 2: 11)

Technical

- Trevor Dann – producer (disc 1: 4–7)
- John Owen Williams – producer (disc 2: 5,6)
- John Sparrow – producer (disc 2: 7–10)
- Nick Gomm – engineer (disc 1: 4–7)
- Mike Robinson – engineer (disc 2: 5–10)
- Simon Heyworth – mastering (disc 1–5)

Our Secrets Are the Same

- Jim Kerr – vocals
- Charlie Burchill – guitar, keyboards, producer, mixing
- Kevin Hunter – guitar, backing vocals, producer
- Eddie Duffy – bass, additional percussion
- Mark Kerr – drums, backing vocals
- Chris Fudurich – additional keyboards, engineer, mixing
- Recorded April–June 1999 at CaVa Studios in Glasgow and Jim Kerr's house.
