= Somebody Up There Likes Me =

Somebody Up There Likes Me may refer to:

== Music ==
=== Songs ===
- "Somebody Up There Likes You", a song by Simple Minds, released in 1982 on their studio album New Gold Dream (81–82–83–84)
- "Somebody Up There Likes Me" (song), a song by David Bowie, released in 1975 on his studio album Young Americans

== Cinema ==
- Somebody Up There Likes Me (1956 film), a 1956 film starring Paul Newman and Pier Angeli
- Somebody Up There Likes Me (1996 film), a 1996 film starring Aaron Kwok, Sammo Hung
- Somebody Up There Likes Me (2012 film), a 2012 independent film directed by Bob Byington
