= Acoustic in Concert =

Live album by Simple Minds
- Released: June 2017
- Recorded: 10 November 2016
- Venue: Hackney Empire, London
- Genre: Rock
- Length: 79:00
- Label: Eagle Rock Entertainment (EAGDV085)
- Producer: Simple Minds

Simple Minds chronology
| Acoustic (2016) | Acoustic in Concert (2017) | Walk Between Worlds (2018) |

Acoustic in Concert is the sixth live album by Scottish rock band Simple Minds, released in June 2017 in three different formats including a Blu-ray, DVD and double DVD-CD package.

== Overview ==
On the eve of the Acoustic album release on 11 November 2016, Simple Minds took to the stage at London's Hackney Empire to perform a special show for the BBC's Radio 2 In Concert series. The show comprised acoustic versions of some of their greatest hits and best-loved tracks along with cover versions of some of the songs that shaped them. The Hackney Empire show was recorded and broadcast by the BBC in association with Eagle Vision to be released in its own right as Acoustic in Concert several months later (in June 2017) on CD, DVD and Blu-ray formats.

== Release ==
The album release date in June 2017 was set to coincide with the UK leg of the Acoustic Live '17 tour (May–June 2017). Three formats carried the entire gig, including a Blu-ray, DVD and double DVD-CD package (the CD and the DVD are housed in a slimline jewel case with eight-page booklet).

== Track listing ==
| No. | Title | Length |
|---|---|---|
| 1. | "New Gold Dream (81-82-83-84)" | 7:05 |
| 2. | "See the Lights" | 4:52 |
| 3. | "Glittering Prize" | 4:14 |
| 4. | "Stand by Love" | 4:26 |
| 5. | "Waterfront" | 5:47 |
| 6. | "Andy Warhol" (David Bowie cover) | 3:26 |
| 7. | "Chelsea Girl" | 4:23 |
| 8. | "Someone Somewhere in Summertime" | 5:30 |
| 9. | "Dancing Barefoot" (Patti Smith cover) | 4:01 |
| 10. | "Speed Your Love to Me" | 3:47 |
| 11. | "Promised You a Miracle" | 4:49 |
| 12. | "Don't You (Forget About Me)" | 5:57 |
| 13. | "Sanctify Yourself" | 5:49 |
| 14. | "Long Black Train" (Richard Hawley cover) | 3:19 |
| 15. | "Alive and Kicking" | 6:36 |
| 16. | "Make Me Smile (Come Up and See Me)" (Steve Harley & Cockney Rebel cover) | 4:59 |

== Personnel ==
=== Simple Minds ===
- Jim Kerr – vocals
- Charlie Burchill – guitar

=== Additional musicians ===
- Ged Grimes – bass and backing vocals
- Gordy Goudie – guitar, harmonica and backing vocals
- Cherisse Osei – percussion
- Sarah Brown – backing vocals
- Catherine Davies a.k.a. The Anchoress – backing vocals
- Steve Harley – special guest
