= Direction of the Heart =

Studio album by Simple Minds
- Released: 21 October 2022
- Recorded: (up to 24 October) 2020
- Studios: Chameleon Studios, Hamburg; London (drums and backing vocals)
- Length: 38:10 47:59 (with 2 bonus tracks) 56:59 (with 4 bonus tracks)
- Label: BMG
- Producers: Simple Minds; Andy Wright; Gavin Goldberg

Simple Minds chronology
| Live in the City of Angels (2019) | Direction of the Heart (2022) | Live in the City of Diamonds (2025) |

Singles from Direction of the Heart
- 1. "Vision Thing" Released: 14 June 2022; 2. "First You Jump" Released: 5 September 2022; 3. "Human Traffic" Released: 9 December 2022; 4. "Solstice Kiss" Released: 6 October 2023

Direction of the Heart is the nineteenth studio album by Scottish rock band Simple Minds, released on 21 October 2022 by BMG.

== Background ==
On 24 October 2020, Simple Minds finished the recording of a new studio album in Germany.

On 14 June 2022, Simple Minds announced the forthcoming release on 21 October 2022 of their new studio album entitled Direction of the Heart via BMG. Most of the new album's tracks were written, created and demoed in Sicily (where both Jim Kerr and guitarist Charlie Burchill live). Unable to come to the UK because of COVID-19 quarantine rules, Simple Minds recorded the album at Hamburg's Chameleon Studios. According to the album liner notes, Direction of the Heart features fewer musicians than any previous Simple Minds album, with Burchill performing guitars, most keyboards, and most bass guitars, as well as programming much of the drumming.

Speaking of the new album, Kerr stated:

How to make a feel-good "Electro-rock" record, during the very worst of times? Direction Of The Heart is the result of that challenge. Who would have thought we'd have so much fun creating it?

== Album's name ==
The album takes its name not from a track from its standard edition (as it is most commonly the case) but from "Direction of the Heart (Taormina 2022)", the first bonus track from its digital and deluxe editions, which is the new re-recorded 2022 version of the original track which had already been released on 4 January 2018 (and physically on 2 February 2018) as the B-side of the "Magic" 7" vinyl single, the lead single from Walk Between Worlds, the band's previous studio album.

== Songs ==
Sources

- The album's opening track "Vision Thing" was released for free on 14 June 2022 on YouTube as the album's lead single
- "First You Jump" was co-written by bassist Ged Grimes
- "Human Traffic" features a guest appearance from Sparks' frontman Russell Mael (this might be a reworking of the song "Human Trafficking" written in Hamburg during Summer 2009, first mentioned by Jim Kerr in February 2010, "not to be finished quite yet" as Jim Kerr stated on 25 November 2010)
- "Solstice Kiss" is a song first written (by Grimes) during the Big Music sessions and mentioned several times during the recordings; re-recorded at the Sphere Recording Studio during the Walk Between Worlds sessions, it was (then) announced as a future contender for the next Simple Minds album
- "Act of Love" is a reimagining of one of the earliest songs written in 1978 by Kerr and Burchill, coinciding with the group's first live performance ever which occurred at Glasgow's Satellite City on 17 January 1978. Simple Minds had already shared this track for free in January 2022.
- "Planet Zero" (lyrics by Kerr, music by Burchill) was described by Kerr as "an insanely catchy and thundering 'space-rock' track with music written by Burchill and featuring arguably one of his best ever guitar melodies", a song "that conjures up Prince set to the background of Hawkwind" and "sounds like pure Simple Minds, albeit remade and remodelled"; original recording started in late August 2011 during the Greatest Hits + Europe Tour and completed in London at the start of September 2011 with Steve Hillage producing
- "The Walls Came Down" is a cover of the Call's 1983 single
- A previous version of "Direction of the Heart" had already been released on 4 January 2018 (and physically on 2 February 2018) as the B-side of the "Magic" 7" vinyl single

== Singles ==
On 14 June 2022, Simple Minds released for free on YouTube the lead single "Vision Thing". On 9 July 2022, Simple Minds released on YouTube a lyric video for "Vision Thing".

On 2 September 2022, it was announced that the world premiere of the new Simple Minds single "First You Jump" would occur on 5 September 2022.

On 7 December 2022, Simple Minds announced the forthcoming release on 9 December 2022 of "Traffic", the JG Ballard-inspired new single featuring Russell Mael of Sparks. This is a new edit of the track "Human Traffic" accompanied by a brand new acoustic version.

Jim Kerr stated about the song:

I ended up writing about a game called 'Human Traffic', where people get so immersed they can no longer tell the difference between reality and the game. And to bring some humour to the song, we asked Russell Mael [of Sparks] to sing on it.

On 22 June 2023, it was announced the forthcoming release on 6 October 2023 of "Solstice Kiss", the fourth and final single taken from the album. It was a chart success in the UK, reaching number 2 on the UK Vinyl Singles Chart and entering the top 40 on the UK Singles Chart for one week at number 31.

== Reception ==
Professional ratings
Aggregate scores
| Source | Rating |
|---|---|
| Metacritic | 75/100 |
Review scores
| Source | Rating |
| AllMusic | 4/5 stars |

Direction of the Heart received generally positive reviews from critics. On the review aggregation website Metacritic, the album has a weighted average score of 75 out of 100 based on 6 reviews, indicating "generally favourable reviews". Mojo wrote "Up-tempo and poppy, Simple Minds' energy remains undiminished on Direction Of The Heart." On AllMusic, reviewer Thom Jurek concluded "Whether taken whole or as the sum of its parts, Direction of the Heart is an album by a band that still has something to prove. They deliver big. Without forsaking their core sound, they offer listeners energized, anthemic, poignant, electro-charged rock & roll." Less positively, Uncut found that "The album largely struggles to match the buzz and momentum of its tone-setting opener."

== Chart performance ==
On 28 October 2022, one week after its release, Direction of the Heart reached #4 in the UK Albums charts, #3 in the Scottish Albums charts and #2 (its highest peak so far) in the UK Independent Albums charts.

== Track listing ==
All tracks are written by Charlie Burchill and Jim Kerr, except where noted.

Direction of the Heart – Standard edition
| No. | Title | Writer(s) | Length |
|---|---|---|---|
| 1. | "Vision Thing" | | 4:39 |
| 2. | "First You Jump" | Burchill; Kerr; Ged Grimes | 4:23 |
| 3. | "Human Traffic" | | 4:17 |
| 4. | "Who Killed Truth?" | | 3:58 |
| 5. | "Solstice Kiss" | Burchill; Kerr; Grimes | 5:23 |
| 6. | "Act of Love" | | 4:00 |
| 7. | "Natural" | | 3:26 |
| 8. | "Planet Zero" | | 4:10 |
| 9. | "The Walls Came Down" | Michael Been | 3:54 |
| Total length: | | | 38:10 |

Direction of the Heart – Digital and deluxe editions
| No. | Title | Length |
|---|---|---|
| 10. | "Direction of the Heart (Taormina 2022)" | 4:55 |
| 11. | "Wondertimes" | 4:54 |
| Total length: | | 47:59 |

Direction of the Heart – Super deluxe edition
| No. | Title | Writer(s) | Length |
|---|---|---|---|
| 12. | "Vision Thing (Exclusive Rehearsal Session)" | | 4:34 |
| 13. | "First You Jump (Exclusive Rehearsal Session)" | Burchill; Kerr; Grimes | 4:26 |
| Total length: | | | 56:59 |

== Personnel ==
Simple Minds

- Jim Kerr – vocals, backing vocals
- Charlie Burchill – guitars, keyboards (all tracks); programming (1–4, 6–11), bass guitar (1, 4, 7–10)

Additional musicians

- Ged Grimes – bass guitar (2, 5, 11); keyboards, programming (2); drum programming, gong, synthesizer (5)
- Cherisse Osei – drums (1, 7, 9)
- Sarah Brown – backing vocals (4, 5, 7, 8, 10)
- Andy Wright – programming (all tracks), backing vocals (1–10)
- Gavin Goldberg – programming (all tracks), backing vocals (2)
- Gary Clark – backing vocals (1, 2, 7)
- Kathleen MacInnes – backing vocals (2)
- Russell Mael – vocals (3)
- Andrew Gillespie – synthesizer (5)

Technical

- Simple Minds – production (all tracks), engineering (1–5, 7–11)
- Andy Wright – additional production
- Gavin Goldberg – additional production (all tracks), engineering (1–5, 7–11)
- Jean-Pierre Chalbos – mastering
- Alan Moulder – mixing
- Caesar Edmunds – mix engineering (1–5, 7–11)
- Tom Herbert – mix engineering (1–9)
- Eike Freese – engineering
- Kevin Burleigh – engineering (2)

Artwork

- Stuart Crouch Creative – art direction / design
- Anthony Lamb – cover illustration
- Christie Goodwin – photography
- Thorsten Samesch – photography

== Charts ==
=== Weekly charts ===
Chart performance for Direction of the Heart
| Chart (2022) | Peak position |
|---|---|
| Austrian Albums (Ö3 Austria) | 22 |
| Belgian Albums (Ultratop Flanders) | 3 |
| Belgian Albums (Ultratop Wallonia) | 3 |
| Dutch Albums (Album Top 100) | 7 |
| French Albums (SNEP) | 51 |
| German Albums (Offizielle Top 100) | 7 |
| Irish Albums (Official Charts) | 50 |
| Italian Albums (FIMI) | 21 |
| Scottish Albums (Official Charts) | 3 |
| Spanish Albums (Promusicae) | 23 |
| Swedish Albums (Sverigetopplistan) | 38 |
| Swiss Albums (Schweizer Hitparade) | 7 |
| UK Albums (Official Charts) | 4 |
| UK Independent Albums (Official Charts) | 2 |
| US Top Album Sales (Billboard) | 63 |

=== Year-end charts ===
2022 year-end chart performance for Direction of the Heart
| Chart (2022) | Position |
|---|---|
| Belgian Albums (Ultratop Wallonia) | 171 |
