= Walk Between Worlds =

Studio album by Simple Minds
- Released: 2 February 2018
- Studios: Sphere Recording, Battersea, central London
- Genres: Pop rock, synth-pop
- Length: 41:25
- Label: BMG
- Producers: Simple Minds; Andy Wright; Gavin Goldberg

Simple Minds chronology
Acoustic in Concert (2017)	Walk Between Worlds (2018)	Live in the City of Angels (2019)

Singles from Walk Between Worlds
- 1. "Magic" Released: 4 January 2018 (physically: 2 February 2018 (Note: b/w "Direction Of The Heart" (non-album track).)); 2. "The Signal and The Noise" Released: 11 January 2018; 3. "Sense of Discovery" Released: 25 January 2018; 4. "Summer" Released: 3 May 2018

Walk Between Worlds is the eighteenth studio album by Scottish rock band Simple Minds, released in February 2018 by BMG.

== Background ==
Walk Between Worlds heralded major lineup changes for Simple Minds. After a period of relative stability since the early 2000s, only vocalist Jim Kerr, guitarist Charlie Burchill and bassist Ged Grimes remained from the previous studio album, Big Music (2014). It was the first album since 2002's Cry without keyboardist Andy Gillespie, who left the band in early 2017. Longtime drummer Mel Gaynor performed on nine of the album's tracks, but left prior to the band's 2018 tour.

Longtime associate Gordon Goudie played acoustic guitar on four songs. Goudie also appeared on the following Simple Minds albums: 2001's Neon Lights, 2002's Cry, 2005's Black & White 050505, 2009's Graffiti Soul, 2016's Acoustic and 2017's Acoustic in Concert. Sarah Brown remains the primary backing vocalist of the band.

Percussionist Cherisse Osei played on three songs and is the official drummer for the 2018 tour. Catherine AD, aka The Anchoress, provided backing vocals on two songs and played keyboards on tour but abruptly left the band during the 2018 tour.

Also returning on the album was Peter-John Vettese, who played piano on two tracks and arranged string orchestra on one song. (Vettese also appeared on the album Real Life in 1991).

Walk Between Worlds was performed in its entirety in February 2018 during seven concerts throughout Europe.

== Artwork ==
The album cover image is by Brazilian visual artist Heitor Magno. Art direction and design by Stuart Crouch Creative

== Critical reception ==
Professional ratings
Aggregate scores
Source	Rating
Metacritic	70/100
Review scores
Source	Rating
AllMusic	4/5 stars
Uncut	3.5/5 stars

Walk Between Worlds received generally positive reviews from music critics. On the review aggregator website Metacritic, the album has a weighted average score of 70 out of 100 based on 9 reviews, indicating "generally favorable reviews". Writing in Uncut, Graeme Thompson described it as, "an expansive, atmospheric reboot of the muscular melancholy of 1985's Once Upon a Time, and "as strangely compelling as anything they've done over the past 35 years." Q magazine wrote "At times, it teeters between nostalgia and self-parody. .... But you can forgive the odd-slip-up, because the whole thing sounds so joyous."

On 28 January 2018, a few days before its release, Walk Between Worlds was awarded "Album of the Week" by The Times.

== Track listing ==
All tracks written by Jim Kerr and Charlie Burchill except where noted.

=== Standard edition ===
1. "Magic" – 4:35
2. "Summer" – 4:57 (Kerr, Burchill, Owen Parker)
3. "Utopia" – 4:15
4. "The Signal and the Noise" – 5:18
5. "In Dreams" – 4:16
6. "Barrowland Star" – 6:23
7. "Walk Between Worlds" – 5:13
8. "Sense of Discovery" – 6:27 (Kerr, Burchill, Parker)

=== Deluxe edition bonus tracks ===
9. "Silent Kiss" – 4:57
10. "Angel Underneath My Skin" – 3:43 (Mark Kerr / Erikah Karst)
11. "Dirty Old Town" (live) – 4:53 (Ewan McColl)

=== B-sides ===
1. "Direction of the Heart" – 4:23 (B-side of the Magic 7" vinyl single) (Note: The "Taormina 2022" version of "Direction Of The Heart" is due to be released on 21 October 2022 as one of two bonus tracks of the forthcoming new studio album Direction of the Heart.)

Durations:

- 50:02 with the first 2 (studio) bonus tracks
- 54:55 with the 3 bonus tracks

== Personnel ==
Simple Minds

- Jim Kerr – lead vocals
- Charlie Burchill – guitars, keyboards, programming, music composition
- Mel Gaynor – drums, percussion (on "Walk Between Worlds")

with:

- Ged Grimes – bass guitar
- Cherisse Osei – drums (on "Sense of Discovery"), percussion (on "Sense of Discovery" and "Dirty Old Town")
- Sarah Brown – additional lead vocals (on "In Dreams"), backing vocals (on "Magic", "The Signal and the Noise", "Barrowland Star", "Walk Between Worlds", "Sense of Discovery", "Angel Underneath My Skin" and "Dirty Old Town")
- Gordy Goudie – acoustic guitar (on "Summer", "Utopia", "Barrowland Star" and "Dirty Old Town")
- Catherine AD aka The Anchoress – backing vocals (on "Utopia" and "Angel Underneath My Skin")
- Peter-John Vettese – piano and string arrangements (on "Barrowland Star")
- Owen Parker – keyboards, programming, music composition (on "Summer" and "Sense Of Discovery")
- Andy Wright – backing vocals (on "Summer", "Sense Of Discovery" and "Angel Underneath My Skin"), production (on all songs)
- Hatty Parker and Emily Parker – additional backing vocals (on "Sense of Discovery")

== Charts ==
=== Weekly charts ===
Weekly chart performance for Walk Between Worlds
Chart (2018)	Peak position
Australian Albums (ARIA)	82
Austrian Albums (Ö3 Austria)	36
Belgian Albums (Ultratop Flanders)	4
Belgian Albums (Ultratop Wallonia)	12
Czech Albums (ČNS IFPI)	52
Dutch Albums (Album Top 100)	23
German Albums (Offizielle Top 100)	7
Irish Albums (IRMA)	22
Italian Albums (FIMI)	14
Scottish Albums (Official Charts)	2
Spanish Albums (Promusicae)	29
Swedish Albums (Sverigetopplistan)	41
Swiss Albums (Schweizer Hitparade)	5
UK Albums (Official Charts)	4
US Independent Albums (Billboard)	25

=== Year-end charts ===
Year-end chart performance for Walk Between Worlds
Chart (2018)	Position
Belgian Albums (Ultratop Flanders)	146
Belgian Albums (Ultratop Wallonia)	185
