= Neon Lights (album) =

Studio album by Simple Minds
- Released: 8 October 2001
- Recorded: Glasgow, Scotland; Dublin, Ireland; Taormina, Sicily, Italy
- Genre: Pop rock
- Length: 41:35
- Label: Eagle - EAGCD 194
- Producers: Simple Minds; Gordy Goudie; Phunk Investigation with D. Tignino and E. Pat Legato

Simple Minds chronology
Our Secrets Are the Same (1999/2004)	Neon Lights (2001)	The Best of Simple Minds (2001)

Simple Minds studio albums chronology
Our Secrets Are the Same (1999/2004)	Neon Lights (2001)	Cry (2002)

Professional ratings
Review scores
Source	Rating
Allmusic	1.5/5 stars
Q	(unfavourable)
Toronto Sun	(favourable)

Neon Lights is a covers studio album and the twelfth studio album by Scottish rock band Simple Minds, released in October 2001.

== Overview ==
Neon Lights is a collection of cover versions put together as a warm up for what would be the next album Cry (2002). As Jim Kerr stated at the time of the album release: «"Neon Lights is the first time Simple Minds have put together a collection of non-original material. We thought it was appropriate at a period of looking back that we go to the very foundations of Simple Minds, which of course is the music and the bands who influenced us."»

== Background ==
After the band's previous album, Our Secrets Are the Same, was leaked by a DJ in Spain, and Simple Minds were fired from EMI, they went into partial retirement. Frontman Jim Kerr moved to Italy to start a hotel. There a number of young Italian artists came to him for advice or input in recording. This finally coaxed the band out of retirement.

They signed a limited contract with Eagle Records. To help the band gain momentum, it was decided that they should record an album of covers to boost awareness of Simple Minds again. Thus Neon Lights was conceived.

== Track listing ==
No.	Title	Writer(s)	Original artist	Length
1.	"Gloria"	Van Morrison	Them	3:45
2.	"The Man Who Sold the World"	David Bowie	David Bowie	4:07
3.	"Homosapien"	Pete Shelley	Pete Shelley	4:20
4.	"Dancing Barefoot"	Patti Smith, Ivan Kral	Patti Smith Group	3:48
5.	"Neon Lights"	Ralf Hütter, Florian Schneider, Karl Bartos	Kraftwerk	4:16
6.	"Hello, I Love You"	Jim Morrison, Robby Krieger, Ray Manzarek, John Densmore	The Doors	3:32
7.	"Bring on the Dancing Horses"	Will Sergeant, Ian McCulloch, Les Pattinson, Pete de Freitas	Echo & the Bunnymen	5:15
8.	"The Needle and the Damage Done"	Neil Young	Neil Young	4:15
9.	"For Your Pleasure"	Bryan Ferry	Roxy Music	4:08
10.	"All Tomorrow's Parties"	Lou Reed	The Velvet Underground	3:35

US release bonus tracks
No.	Title	Writer(s)	Original artist	Length
11.	"Being Boiled"	Philip Oakey, Martyn Ware, Ian Craig Marsh	The Human League	3:51
12.	"Love Will Tear Us Apart"	Ian Curtis, Peter Hook, Stephen Morris, Bernard Sumner	Joy Division	4:48

== Other releases ==
A promo version was also pressed which was titled Original Versions of Songs Covered on "Neon Lights", which comprised all the original versions of the songs covered, making this the only Simple Minds release to be devoid of Simple Minds music. However, Eagle Records encountered some problems with copyrights for a couple of songs, so fewer than 25 of these promos were pressed, making this extremely hard to find.

Two singles were released from the album: the Dancing Barefoot EP, and a number of remixes of "Homosapien".

== Personnel ==
Simple Minds

- Jim Kerr – vocals, producer (except "Gloria")
- Charlie Burchill – guitar, keyboards, bass, programmed rhythms, arrangements, producer (except "Gloria")

with:

- Gordy Goudie – guitar, keyboards, bass, drums, vocals, programmed rhythms, arrangements, producer (except "Gloria")
- Dee Miller – additional vocals
- Kevin Burleigh – additional vocals, engineer, mixing

Technical

- Phunk Investigation – producer on "Gloria"
- Daniele Tignino – producer on "Gloria"
- Emiliano Patrik Legato – producer on "Gloria"
- Simon Heyworth – mastering
- Fabrique – design
- Martin Hunter – photography
