= Sunday Express – Live (Volumes 1 & 2) =

Sunday Express – Live (Vol. 1 & 2)

Live album by Simple Minds
- Released: 15 & 22 April 2007
- Recorded: 2006 at various locations
- Genre: Rock
- Length: 2:20:30; 1:14:47 (live material)
- Label: Sunday Express with Sanctuary Records' authorization
- Producer: Simple Minds

Simple Minds chronology
Black & White 050505 (2005)	Sunday Express – Live (Vol. 1 & 2) (2007)	Themes – Volume 5: March 91–September 92 (2008)

Sunday Express – Live is the third (double) live album by Scottish rock band Simple Minds, released in April 2007.

== History ==
Simple Minds arranged to release two promotional exclusive free live CDs in April 2007 through the UK newspaper The Sunday Express, making it only the band's second official double live release in its entire career, the first one being Live in the City of Light released in May 1987.

This first CD Live Volume 1 was released on 15 April 2007 and the second one Live Volume 2 a week later on 22 April 2007.

The 2-CD live album features live songs from a variety of sources recorded during the 2006 Black and White Tour.

Although no recording dates were given for any of the songs, it is known that "Sanctify Yourself" was recorded on 28 August 2006 at the T on the Fringe music festival in Edinburgh.

Each CD includes three ten-minute bonus tracks of ambient music credited to Austin Stuart Hanlin.

== Track listing ==
CD Sunday Express NN-10344 Volume 1: 1:11:00; live material: 37:49

1. "Alive and Kicking" – 4:56
2. "New Gold Dream (81,82,83,84)" – 3:54
3. "Mandela Day" – 6:52
4. "Up on the Catwalk" – 4:37
5. "Different World" [TAORMINA.ME] – 4:12
6. "Let There Be Love" – 4:38
7. "Hypnotised" – 5:00
8. "A Life Shot in Black and White" – 3:35
9. "Move on One Minute Departure" – 10:33 (studio bonus track)
10. "Waves of Glass" – 10:58 (studio bonus track)
11. "Moroccan Pipes" – 11:40 (studio bonus track)

CD Sunday Express NN-10340 Volume 2: 1:09:30; live material: 36:58

1. "Waterfront" – 4:22
2. "Glittering Prize" – 3:45
3. "Sanctify Yourself" – 5:21
4. "Don't You (Forget About Me)" – 4:20
5. "All the Things She Said" – 4:00
6. "Ghost Dancing" – 4:22
7. "See the Lights" – 4:48
8. "Dolphins" – 6:00
9. "Voices in Our Heads" – 10:39 (studio bonus track)
10. "One Two Three More Things" – 11:22 (studio bonus track)
11. "Shaft of Light" – 10:31 (studio bonus track)

== Credits ==
- Live recordings mixed by Jez Coad
- Photography: www.sarahcresswell.com
