= Black & White 050505 =

Studio album by Simple Minds
- Released: 12 September 2005
- Recorded: 2004–5 May 2005
- Studios: Wisseloord Studios, Hilversum, Netherlands
- Genres: Pop rock, synth-pop
- Length: 40:57
- Label: Sanctuary
- Producers: Simple Minds, Jez Coad

Simple Minds chronology
Silver Box (2004)	Black & White 050505 (2005)	Sunday Express – Live (Vol. 1 & 2) (2007)

Simple Minds studio albums chronology
Cry (2002)	Black & White 050505 (2005)	Graffiti Soul (2009)

Singles from Black & White 050505
- 1. "Home" Released: 5 September 2005; 2. "Stranger" Released: 14 November 2005

Professional ratings
Review scores
Source	Rating
AllMusic	3/5 stars
BBC	very positive
Daily Express	4/5 stars
PopMatters	8/10
Q	2/5 stars
Record Collector	5/5 stars
The Times	3/5 stars

Black & White 050505 is the fourteenth studio album (of original material) by Scottish rock band Simple Minds, released in the UK in September 2005. The album was not officially released in the US.

== Overview ==
Work on this follow-up to Cry started in 2002 and was heavily influenced by the band's live work from that period. At the time of the album release, Jim Kerr stated about the new album: "Having delivered Black and White 050505, an album that we believe is classic Simple Minds, albeit with a whole new energy. We can honestly say that we are delighted with the results and look forward with a totally revitalised outlook to this next phase of our ongoing creativity."

== Recording ==
The sessions for Black and White 050505 yielded an album and a half of material. The tracks "Light Travels" and "Fortune Teller" were left off the album because Jim Kerr did not want to compromise the album's structure or overall feel.

Demoed for Black and White 050505, "Light Travels" was later rerecorded and released on Graffiti Soul (2009).

After initially appearing as an idea of a melody during the recording sessions for Good News from the Next World (1995) and recorded for Black and White 050505 as "Fortune Teller", the song was then considered for Graffiti Soul but, again, not released until it was finally rerecorded (and retitled) as "Magic" for Walk Between Worlds (2018).

The recording sessions for the album ended on 5 May 2005 (05/05/05), hence the number in the album's title.

== Track listing ==
=== Standard edition ===
No.	Title	Lyrics	Music	Length
1.	"Stay Visible"	Jim Kerr	Jez Coad	5:19
2.	"Home"	Kerr	Charlie Burchill, Gordy Goudie	4:23
3.	"Stranger"	Kerr, Daniele Tignino	Tignino, Pat Legato	4:07
4.	"Different World (Taormina.Me)"	Kerr, Coad	Burchill	4:37
5.	"Underneath the Ice"	Kerr	Burchill, Coad	4:45
6.	"The Jeweller Part 2"	Kerr	Burchill	4:18
7.	"A Life Shot in Black and White"	Kerr	Coad, Burchill	3:35
8.	"Kiss the Ground"	Kerr	Burchill	4:06
9.	"Dolphins"	Kerr	Burchill	5:57

=== 2019 Deluxe Edition and Rejuvenation 2001–2014 box set bonus tracks ===
No.	Title	Lyrics	Music	Origin	Length
10.	"Too Much Television"	Sean Kelly	Kelly	iTunes download; B-side to "Stranger"; Japanese edition bonus track	4:20
11.	"Bird on a Wire"	Kerr	Burchill, Kevin Hunter	B-side to "Stranger"	3:54
12.	"Mighty Joe Moon"	Grant Lee Phillips	Phillips	B-side to "Home"	3:42

== Left-overs ==
At least, another track was demoed for Black & White 050505: "Angel Under My Skin" written by Mark Kerr and Erikah Karst during the Cry period (2002). The song was later worked on for Graffiti Soul (2009) before it was finally recorded and released on Walk Between Worlds (2018).

== Live performances ==
All the songs have been played live:

1. "Stay Visible" during the 2005 "Intimate", 2006 "Black And White", 2009 "30 Years Live European" & 2009 "Graffiti Soul" tours
2. "Home" during the 2005 "Intimate", 2006 "Black And White", 2008 "Celebrate 30 Years Live", 2009 "30 Years Live European" & 2009 "Graffiti Soul", 2010 "Festival Show", 2010 "Final Shows" tours
3. "Stranger" during the 2005 "Intimate" & 2006 "Black And White" tours
4. "Different World [taormina.me]" during the 2005 "Intimate", 2006 "Black And White" & 2009 "30 Years Live European" tours
5. "Underneath The Ice" only during the 2006 "Black And White" tour
6. "The Jeweller Part 2" during the 2005 "Intimate" & 2006 "Black And White" tours
7. "A Life Shot in Black & White" only during the 2006 "Black And White" tour
8. "Kiss The Ground" only one time (in Copenhagen, Denmark) during the 2006 "Black And White" tour
9. "Dolphins" during the 2006 "Black And White" & 2009 "30 Years Live European" tours

== Personnel ==
Adapted from the album's liner notes, except where noted.

Simple Minds

- Jim Kerr — vocals
- Charlie Burchill — guitars, keyboards, programming on "Bird on a Wire"
- Mel Gaynor — drums, percussion

Additional musicians

- Eddie Duffy — bass guitar, percussion
- Andy Gillespie — keyboards
- Jez Coad — additional guitars and keyboards
- Daniele Tignino — backing vocals on "Stranger"
- John Biancale — backing vocals on "Stranger"
- Sean Kelly — guest vocals on "Too Much Television"

Technical

- Simple Minds — producer, arrangements
- Jez Coad — producer, arrangements
- Kevin Hunter — producer on "Bird on a Wire"
- Arjen Mensinga — engineer
- Michiel Hoogenboezem — engineer
- Chris Fuderich — engineer on "Bird on a Wire"
- Bob Clearmountain — mixing
- Brandon Duncan — mixing assistant
- Kevin Harp — mixing on "Bird on a Wire"
- Bob Ludwig — mastering
- Daniele Tignino — pre-production in Taormina, Sicily
- Ottavio Leo — pre-production in Taormina, Sicily
- Gordy Goudie — pre-production in Glasgow, Scotland
- Kevin Burleigh — pre-production in Glasgow, Scotland
- Andy Gillespie — pre-production in Glasgow, Scotland
- Fabrique — design
- Chris van Diemen — art direction, design, photography
- Jeroen van Erp — art direction, design
- Arjan van den Berg — band photography
- Chantal Wouters — photography

== Certifications ==
Region	Certification	Certified units/sales
Italy (FIMI)	Gold	40,000^{*}
^{*} Sales figures based on certification alone.

== Sources ==
- Official Simple Minds web site
