= Cry (Simple Minds album) =

Studio album by Simple Minds
- Released: 1 April 2002
- Recorded: 2001; Sicily and Glasgow, Scotland
- Genre: Pop rock; synth-pop
- Length: 47:44
- Label: Eagle
- Producer: Jim Kerr; Gordy Goudie; Charlie Burchill; Planet Funk

Simple Minds chronology
The Best of Simple Minds (2001)	Cry (2002)	Silver Box (2004)

Simple Minds studio albums chronology
Neon Lights (2001)	Cry (2002)	Black & White 050505 (2005)

Singles from Cry
- 1. "Cry" Released: March 2002; 2. "Spaceface" Released: June 2002

Professional ratings
Review scores
Source	Rating
Allmusic	2.5/5 stars
Canoe.ca	(favourable)
Q	2/5 stars
Uncut	(mixed)

Cry is the thirteenth studio album (of original material) by Scottish rock band Simple Minds, officially released in April 2002. (Note: ... despite the fact that it had already circulated on the Internet weeks before.)

== Overview ==
Cry was Simple Minds first album in several years after the hiatus that followed the release of Neapolis and the withdrawn Our Secrets Are the Same. As a comeback, they decided to make a focused pop album with songs focused on melody and tight arrangements.

As Jim Kerr stated at the time of the album release: «"I like the idea of very focused melodies, tight arrangements, commercial stuff. I said to Charlie: This is the only kind of music I want to make just now. Let's try and go on the edge and do some real pop stuff."»

== Recording ==
Cry was recorded in the last six months of 2001 in Sicily and Glasgow in Scotland. It was the most collaborative Simple Minds album written. Jim Kerr worked with several Italian musicians, multi-instrumentalist Gordon Goudie and others, while Charlie Burchill's input was down to two tracks. Included as the last track on the album was also the instrumental "The Floating World", written by Vince Clarke.

The lead single from the album, "Cry", heavily samples "Indestructible" by Matthew Good Band.

== Critical reception ==
The album received mixed reviews. While James McNair in Q magazine called it "a disappointing concoction of half-baked ideas and style ingredients" it also received some more favourable reviews. Jane Stevenson in the Toronto Sun wrote: "The epic-sounding numbers Spaceface, New Sunshine Morning, One Step Closer, Sugar and Sleeping Girl are particularly dance-floor-worthy, while the more stripped-down Lazy Lately and Cry Again are definitely worth a listen. Not nearly as well executed are the acoustic guitar number Face In The Sun, the disjointed Disconnected and Slave Nation, and the album-ending throwaway instrumental The Floating World." Uncut reviewer David Stubbs noted the band's attempt to rejuvenate their sound: "while it's heartening that Simple Minds have abandoned their windier stadium rock tendencies, this lacks the magesterial lightness of a New Gold Dream or Sons and Fascination."

== Track listing ==
=== Standard edition ===
No.	Title	Writer(s)	Length
1.	"Cry"	Jim Kerr, Dino Maggiorana, Nello Nicita, Daniele Tignino, Pat Legato	3:57
2.	"Spaceface"	J. Kerr, Sean Kelly	3:54
3.	"New Sunshine Morning"	J. Kerr, Maggiorana, Nicita, Tignino, Legato	3:37
4.	"One Step Closer"	J. Kerr, Marco Baroni, Domenico Canu, Sergio Della Monica, Alex Neri	6:07
5.	"Face in the Sun"	Mark Kerr	3:58
6.	"Disconnected"	J. Kerr, Kevin Hunter, Gordy Goudie	3:38
7.	"Lazy Lately"	Charlie Burchill, M. Kerr	4:03
8.	"Sugar"	Burchill, M. Kerr	3:14
9.	"Sleeping Girl"	J. Kerr, Maggiorana, Nicita	4:12
10.	"Cry Again"	J. Kerr, Maggiorana, Nicita, Tignino, Legato	3:36
11.	"Slave Nation"	J. Kerr, Hunter, Goudie	3:02
12.	"The Floating World"	Vince Clarke	4:26
Total length:			47:44

=== 2019 Deluxe edition and Rejuvenation 2001–2014 7CD+DVD box set bonus tracks ===
No.	Title	Writer(s)	Origin	Length
13.	"Lead the Blind"	Burchill, M. Kerr	B-side to "Cry", 2002	3:58
14.	"For What It's Worth"	Stephen Stills	B-side to "Cry"	3.43
15.	"The Garden"	J. Kerr, Burchill, Hunter	B-side to "Cry"	3:15
16.	"New Sunrise"	J. Kerr, Maggiorana, Nicita, Tignino, Legato	B-side to "Spaceface", 2002; "New Sunshine Morning" acoustic version	4:17
17.	"Where Is the Max?"	J. Kerr, Baroni, Canu, Della Monica, Neri	Non Zero Sumness, 2002; "One Step Closer" alternate (instrumental) version	4.40
Total length:				1:07:37

== Left-overs ==
At least, another track was written (by Mark Kerr and Erikah Karst) during the Cry period: "Angel Under My Skin". The song was later worked on for Black & White 050505 (2005) and Graffiti Soul (2009) before it was finally recorded and released as a Deluxe edition bonus track on Walk Between Worlds (2018).

== Live performances ==
Many of the songs have been played live:

- "Cry" during both 2002 "Floating World" & 2003 "Alive And Kicking" tours
- "Spaceface" during the 2002 "Floating World", 2003 "Alive And Kicking" & 2004 "Festival" tours (& during Lostboy! AKA's October–November 2010 "Electroset" tour) (Jim Kerr notably sung the infamous "Fish & Chips" lyrics on 17 August 2002 in Bilbao, Spain)
- "New Sunshine Morning" only during the 2002 "Floating World" tour & 2004 "Festival" tour
- "One Step Closer" during a number of tours: 2002 "Floating World", 2003 "Alive And Kicking", 2004 "Festival", 2009 "Graffiti Soul", 2010 "Australian", 2010 "Festival Show" tours & 2010 Final Shows
- "Face in the Sun" only four times (in the UK & France) during the 2002 "Floating World" tour
- "Disconnected" only one time (in Aberdeen, Scotland, UK) during the 2002 "Floating World" tour
- "Sugar" only three times (in Germany) during the 2002 "Floating World" tour
- "Sleeping Girl" only during the 2006 "Black And White" tour (& during Lostboy! AKA's October–November 2010 "Electroset" tour)
- "New Sunrise" only one time during a session of the Billy Sloan show on Radio Clyde, broadcast on 14 April 2002
- "For What It's Worth" during the "Acoustic Live '17" tour in UK & Europe (8 April – 8 June 2017).

== Personnel ==
Adapted from the album liner notes, except where noted.

Simple Minds

- Jim Kerr – vocals, arrangements
- Charlie Burchill – guitar, bass, keyboards, drums, effects, programming

Additional musicians

- Gordy Goudie – guitar, bass, keyboards, drums, effects, programming, additional vocals, arrangements
- E Pat Lego – keyboards, drums, effects, programming
- Dino Maggiorana – keyboards, drums, effects, programming
- Planet Funk – instruments (4, 17)
- Mark Kerr – acoustic guitar (5), additional vocals
- Daniele Tignino – additional vocals

Technical

- Jim Kerr – producer (1–3, 5, 6, 9–12)
- Charlie Burchill – producer (7, 8, 13, 15)
- Gordy Goudie – assistant producer (1–3, 5, 6, 9–12), producer (14, 16)
- Planet Funk – producer (4, 17)
- Kevin Hunter – producer (15)
- Kevin Burleigh – engineer
- Ren Swan – mixing
- Simon Heyworth – mastering
- 2Fluid_Creative – design
- Martin Hunter – photography
- Mick Hutson – photography
- Toorkwaz Design – photography

== Sources ==
- Official Simple Minds web site
- Dream Giver Redux
