= Someone Somewhere in Summertime =

"Someone Somewhere In Summertime"

Single by Simple Minds

from the album New Gold Dream (81–82–83–84)
- B-side: "King Is White and in the Crowd"
- Released: 5 November 1982
- Genre: New wave
- Length: 4:35
- Label: Virgin
- Songwriters: Charlie Burchill; Derek Forbes; Jim Kerr; Michael MacNeil
- Producer: Peter Walsh

Simple Minds singles chronology
"Glittering Prize" (1982)	"Someone Somewhere In Summertime" (1982)	"I Travel (2nd reissue)" (1982)

"Someone Somewhere In Summertime" is a song by Scottish rock band Simple Minds which was released as the third single from their fifth studio album New Gold Dream (81–82–83–84) (1982). Written by the members of Simple Minds, it was released on 5 November 1982 by Virgin Records.

== Background and recording ==
There are minor historical discrepancies regarding the song's exact title. The original album version of New Gold Dream (81–82–83–84) in 1982 lists the opening track as "Someone Somewhere in Summertime", whereas the single release titled the song as "Someone Somewhere (In Summertime)" on the front cover. The 2001 compilation album The Best of Simple Minds uses this exact title, while the 2003 DVD release "Seen The Lights: A Visual History" lists the song as "Someone, Somewhere (In Summertime)".

Mel Gaynor was the drummer for the song, with Kenny Hyslop and Mike Ogletree being the other session drummers for New Gold Dream (81–82–83–84). No promotional video was made for the song's release, as the band were preparing for a forthcoming tour of the UK.

In a 2008 interview Jim Kerr said of the song: "I think the Someone Somewhere (In Summertime) songwriting craft (...) gives the feeling that we'd arrived - that we'd reached some kind of maturity."

== Composition ==
Although a new wave track in the same genre as the band's previous two singles, "Someone Somewhere In Summertime" is noticeably different in terms of melodic effect. Described by AllMusic's Dave Thompson as an "introspective" track with a "dreamy atmosphere", the song is generally seen as taking a gentler and more delicate turn that, as the title suggests, evokes a yearning nature. This can be seen where the song demonstrates imagining blissful or ecstatic scenes in the line: "Moments burn, slow burning golden nights, once more see city lights".

== Critical reception ==
Similarly to "Promised You a Miracle" and "Glittering Prize", "Someone Somewhere in Summertime" has received positive acclaim, praised by AllMusic's MacKenzie Wilson for its ability for "tapping into internal emotion". A Rolling Stone review in 2003 described the "lush" and "erotic" song as one of the album's strongest and more "tuneful" tracks. A Q magazine special in January 2005 stated the song as opening New Gold Dream (81–82–83–84) in "magisterial fashion. Charlie Burchill's Edge-like guitar descended across Mick McNeil's textured keyboards, creating a ravishing sense of wonder." Cash Box praised the way the music and the words fit together, with the "barren mood mirrored by stark guitar work and synthesizers" supporting the lyrics about the singer looking for someone with whom "to share his solitary psychic state."

More recent reviews of the song, especially live, also have been positive. The Independent's Simon Price describes "Someone Somewhere in Summertime" as "an unimpeachable highlight, starting 100ft above the ground and never coming down to earth." The Guardian's Dave Simpson also complimented the track, labelling it as "a waltz through a mythical August haze" and describing its parent album as a "shimmering masterpiece".

== Commercial performance ==
Its performance in the UK Singles Chart was significantly poorer than the band's two previous hits, peaking at no. 36 and charting for 5 weeks. Nonetheless, it has become a live favourite. and acclaimed as one of the album's most popular tracks.

The song also charted in Ireland, peaking at number 19.

== Influence and legacy ==
"Someone Somewhere in Summertime" has been sampled on the song "The World Is Mine" by French producer David Guetta.

Irish singer and musician Bono, the lead singer of the Irish rock band U2 chose "Someone Somewhere in Summertime" as one of his chosen records on his broadcast of Desert Island Discs on BBC Radio 4 which was first broadcast on 26 June 2022.

The band re–recorded the song as part of their performance on the Sky Arts Greatest Albums Live series. The set was performed at the Paisley Abbey in Paisley, Renfrewshire in Scotland, with the recordings later released by the band on a live album release entitled New Gold Dream – Live from Paisley Abbey in recognition of the New Gold Dream album having celebrated its 40th year of release.

== Charts ==
Chart (1982)	Peak position
Australia (Kent Music Report)	51
Ireland (IRMA)	19
UK Singles (Official Charts)	36
