= New Gold Dream (81/82/83/84) =

Studio album by Simple Minds
- Released: 13 September 1982
- Recorded: February–August 1982
- Studios: Townhouse (London); The Manor (Shipton-on-Cherwell)
- Genres: New wave; art pop; synth-pop
- Length: 46:02
- Labels: Virgin (UK); A&M (US)
- Producer: Peter Walsh

Simple Minds chronology
Celebration (1982)	New Gold Dream (81/82/83/84) (1982)	Sparkle in the Rain (1984)

Simple Minds studio albums chronology
Sons and Fascination/Sister Feelings Call (1981)	New Gold Dream (81/82/83/84) (1982)	Sparkle in the Rain (1984)

Singles from New Gold Dream (81/82/83/84)
- 1. "Promised You a Miracle" Released: 2 April 1982; 2. "Glittering Prize" Released: 20 August 1982; 3. "Someone Somewhere in Summertime" Released: 5 November 1982

New Gold Dream (81/82/83/84) is the fifth studio album by the Scottish band Simple Minds. The album was released in September 1982 by record label Virgin. It is considered one of the defining albums of the new pop movement of the early 1980s. It spawned the commercially successful singles "Promised You a Miracle" released in April 1982, "Glittering Prize" released in August 1982, and “Someone Somewhere in Summertime" released in November 1982. The album's title track, "New Gold Dream (81/82/83/84)", saw a limited release in Italy in March 1983 following the band's Italian leg of their supporting tour.

The release of New Gold Dream (81/82/83/84) was considered a turning point for the band, whose previous studio albums did not gain significant commercial success. Lead singer Jim Kerr said that "every band or artist with a history has an album that's their Holy Grail, I suppose New Gold Dream was ours", and that the recording of the album was "a special time because we were really beginning to break through with that record, both commercially and critically. The people that liked that record connected with it in a special way".

The album has been praised as some of the band's finest work, and was included in the book 1001 Albums You Must Hear Before You Die.

== Background and recording ==
New Gold Dream originated in Simple Minds' unexpected popular and commercial success during an Australian tour with Icehouse following the release of Sons and Fascination/Sister Feelings Call. The band was prompted by this experience to write "Promised You a Miracle" upon their return to Europe. In a 2012 interview, singer Jim Kerr recalled the production of the album as a wonderful time during the late spring and early summer of 1982 in which "everything we tried worked", adding: "There were no arguments. We were in love with what we were doing, playing it, listening to it. You don't get many periods in your life when it all goes your way."

The album was recorded over a five-month period at Rockfield Studios, The Townhouse and Oxford Manor, with preproduction at The Old Mill in Fife. During a short tour rehearsal in January 1982, the band wrote what would become the songs "King Is White and in the Crowd", "Hunter and the Hunted" and "Promised You a Miracle", a song that proved pivotal to the musical direction of the album. It was unveiled in a Kid Jensen session for Radio 1 and released as a single in April 1982. Producer Peter Walsh was hired on the recommendation of guitarist Charlie Burchill, who had been impressed by Walsh's work on the remix of the band's previous single "Sweat in Bullet".

This was the band's first album without their original line-up, following the departure of drummer Brian McGee. New drummer Kenny Hyslop was with the band for the initial sessions, when "Promised You a Miracle" was recorded, but was replaced by Mike Ogletree. However, partway through the sessions, Walsh became dissatisfied with Ogletree's drumming, so he recruited session drummer Mel Gaynor to complete the album. Ogletree returned for the subsequent tour, during which he was fired and Gaynor joined as the band's official drummer.

Jazz keyboardist Herbie Hancock guested on the album and plays a synthesizer solo on the song "Hunter and the Hunted".

== Release and performance ==
Released in September 1982, the album entered the UK Albums Chart at number six and reached its peak position of number three the following week. It would spend a total of 53 weeks on the UK charts. In the United States, A&M issued some limited-edition translucent gold with maroon-coloured marble vinyl pressings of the album.

The album spawned a total of three singles which all reached the top forty of the UK Singles Charts – "Promised You a Miracle" (released in April 1982) became the band's first top 20 hit, reaching no.13 on the UK Singles Chart during an 11 week chart run. "Glittering Prize" (August 1982) was almost equally successful, peaking at no.16 and "Someone Somewhere in Summertime" (November 1982) reached no.36. The title track saw a limited release in Italy when the band visited in March 1983. Virgin Records reissued the album as a remastered edition in 2002 (cardboard vinyl replica edition) and early 2003 (jewel case). On the 2002/2003 edition, the gaps between the tracks on the album are slightly shorter. Virgin also reissued the album on SACD in 2003.

In 2005, Virgin released a DVD-Audio version that was remixed by Ronald Prent. All of the tracks except "Colours Fly and Catherine Wheel" and "Promised You a Miracle" (for which the multitrack tapes were lost) were remixed in 5.1 surround sound, and a downmixed 2.0 stereo version was created for DVD-Audio setups without surround sound. The DVD-Audio version contains the bonus track "In Every Heaven," which had previously been lost as it was not labelled properly on the master tape. An instrumental version of the song titled "Soundtrack for Every Heaven" had been the B-side of the "Someone, Somewhere (In Summertime)" 12-inch single and was also included in the Methods of Dance Volume 2 compilation on Virgin. An alternative version of "In Every Heaven" from the same sessions appears in the X5 box set.

In 2016, Virgin Records issued a six-disc deluxe box set including the original album, single versions, alternative takes and demos, B-sides, 1982 radio sessions and a DVD with the 2005 5.1 mix of the album and performances on Top of the Pops. Virgin also reissued the album as a digital download, a two-CD set, a single CD and a vinyl LP.

== Reception ==
Professional ratings
Review scores
Source	Rating
AllMusic	4.5/5 stars
Encyclopedia of Popular Music	4/5 stars
The Great Rock Discography	8/10
Mojo	4/5 stars
Q	4/5 stars
Record Collector	5/5 stars
Rolling Stone	3/5 stars
Smash Hits	8/10
Uncut	5/5 stars
The Village Voice	C+

The album received several positive reviews. In NME, Paul Morley wrote: "My loyalty towards Simple Minds is known to be considerable, yet even I am jarred by the constant beauty of this music. New Gold Dream robs me of my breath." In Record Mirror, Mark Cooper wrote: "They have stunned and impressed me but they have rarely moved me. Suddenly, in New Gold Dream, they’ve conquered their fear of feeling and come out shining.”

Journalist David Stubbs places New Gold Dream (81/82/83/84) alongside ABC's The Lexicon of Love and the Associates' Sulk in a group of albums that he describes as the "zenith" of pop music. In a 2016 review in Record Collector, journalist Tom Byford wrote: "New Gold Dream (81/82/83/84) stands shining and singular in the Simple Minds canon... Now it not only takes its place among the greatest future-pop albums of the 80s (Dare, The Lexicon Of Love), it sits comfortably among the greatest pop albums of all time."

The album was included in the book 1001 Albums You Must Hear Before You Die.

Dave Gahan of Depeche Mode named it the best album of 1982. When creating their 1984 album The Unforgettable Fire, the Irish rock band U2 saw New Gold Dream as an influence.

In 1998, Jim Kerr said: "Every band or artist with a history has an album that's their Holy Grail. I suppose New Gold Dream was ours. It was a special time because we were really beginning to break through with that record, both commercially and critically. The people that liked that record connected with it in a special way. There was a depth to it: it created its own mythology. It stood out. It was our most successful record to date and, critically, the Paul Morleys of this world were writing very nice things about it."

== Track listing ==
All tracks are written by Simple Minds (Charlie Burchill, Derek Forbes, Jim Kerr, Michael MacNeil), except where noted.

Side A
No.	Title	Length
1.	"Someone Somewhere in Summertime"	4:36
2.	"Colours Fly and Catherine Wheel"	3:49
3.	"Promised You a Miracle"	4:28
4.	"Big Sleep"	5:00
5.	"Somebody Up There Likes You" (instrumental)	5:02

Side B
No.	Title	Length
6.	"New Gold Dream (81/82/83/84)"	5:39
7.	"Glittering Prize"	4:33
8.	"Hunter and the Hunted"	5:55
9.	"King Is White and in the Crowd"	7:00

2005 DVDA bonus track
No.	Title	Length
10.	"In Every Heaven"	4:50

Deluxe edition disc 2: Extended Versions
No.	Title	Writer(s)	Length
1.	"Promised You a Miracle" (extended)		4:51
2.	"Seeing Out the Angel" (instrumental remix)	Brian McGee, Charlie Burchill, Derek Forbes, Jim Kerr, Michael MacNeil	6:32
3.	"Promised You a Miracle" (US remix)		6:00
4.	"Promised You a Miracle" (US dub)		5:28
5.	"Promised You a Miracle" (US special extended remix)		6:11
6.	"Glittering Prize" (club mix)		4:57
7.	"Glittering Prize" (extended theme)		4:57
8.	"Someone Somewhere in Summertime" (extended)		6:06
9.	"New Gold Dream (81/82/83/84)" (German 12" mix)		6:53
10.	"King Is White and in the Crowd" (instrumental)		8:46
11.	"New Gold Dream (81/82/83/84)" (German 12" remix with drums)		6:56
12.	"In Every Heaven"		4:24

Deluxe edition disc 3: Edits and B-Sides
No.	Title	Writer(s)	Length
1.	"Promised You a Miracle" (edit)		3:59
2.	"Theme for Great Cities"	Brian McGee, Charlie Burchill, Derek Forbes, Jim Kerr, Michael MacNeil	5:42
3.	"Glittering Prize" (edit)		3:58
4.	"Glittering Prize" (theme)		4:06
5.	"Someone Somewhere in Summertime" (edit)		3:55
6.	"Soundtrack for Every Heaven"		4:56
7.	"New Gold Dream (81/82/83/84)" (7" mix)		4:46

Deluxe edition disc 4: Radio Sessions
No.	Title	Writer(s)	Length
1.	"Promised You a Miracle" (David Jensen Session: 11 February 1982)		4:27
2.	"In Trance as Mission" (David Jensen Session: 11 February 1982)	Brian McGee, Charlie Burchill, Derek Forbes, Jim Kerr, Michael MacNeil	4:30
3.	"King Is White and in the Crowd" (David Jensen Session: 11 February 1982)		5:18
4.	"Promised You a Miracle" (John Peel Session: 15 February 1982)		4:38
5.	"Love Song" (John Peel Session: 15 February 1982)	Brian McGee, Charlie Burchill, Derek Forbes, Jim Kerr, Michael MacNeil	5:48
6.	"Sons and Fascination" (John Peel Session: 15 February 1982)	Brian McGee, Charlie Burchill, Derek Forbes, Jim Kerr, Michael MacNeil	6:42
7.	"King Is White and in the Crowd" (John Peel Session: 15 February 1982)		6:05
8.	"Someone Somewhere in Summertime" (David Jensen Session: 13 August 1982)		5:09
9.	"Glittering Prize" (David Jensen Session: 13 August 1982)		4:19
10.	"Hunter and the Hunted" (David Jensen Session: 13 August 1982)		5:55

Deluxe edition disc 5: Alternative Mixes, Roughs and Demos
No.	Title	Length
1.	"Someone Somewhere in Summertime" (full duration)	5:43
2.	"Colours Fly and Catherine Wheel" (full duration instrumental)	4:37
3.	"Promised You a Miracle" (remix for album: long)	4:50
4.	"Big Sleep" (instrumental)	5:09
5.	"In Every Heaven" (full duration)	5:37
6.	"Somebody Up There Likes You" (full duration instrumental)	5:11
7.	"New Gold Dream (81/82/83/84)" (full duration)	7:01
8.	"Hunter and the Hunted" (alternative take)	5:14
9.	"King Is White and in the Crowd" (monitor mix)	7:13
10.	"In Every Heaven" (early version)	4:35

Deluxe edition disc 6 (DVD): New Gold Dream (5.1 Mix & Videos)
No.	Title	Length
1.	"Someone Somewhere in Summertime" (5.1 mix)	5:22
2.	"Colours Fly and Catherine Wheel" (5.1 mix)	3:49
3.	"Promised You a Miracle" (5.1 mix)	4:28
4.	"Big Sleep" (5.1 mix)	5:27
5.	"Somebody Up There Likes You" (5.1 mix)	5:45
6.	"New Gold Dream (81/82/83/84)" (5.1 mix)	6:08
7.	"Glittering Prize" (5.1 mix)	4:40
8.	"Hunter and the Hunted" (5.1 mix)	6:09
9.	"King Is White and in the Crowd" (5.1 mix)	7:31
10.	"In Every Heaven" (5.1 mix)	4:46
11.	"Promised You a Miracle" (promo video)	4:03
12.	"Glittering Prize" (promo video)	4:03
13.	"Promised You a Miracle" (Top of the Pops performance 17 April 1982)	3:33
14.	"Glittering Prize" (Top of the Pops performance 2 September 1982)	3:39

Notes

- The deluxe edition consists of disc 1 (The Original Album) and disc 2 (Extended Versions).
- The super deluxe edition contains all six discs.
- The original continental European CD release features an extended remix of the title track in place of the album version, clocking in at 6:53, while the original US release features an edited version of the song that shortens it down to 4:46.

== Personnel ==
Adapted from the album's liner notes.

Simple Minds

- Jim Kerr – lead vocals
- Charlie Burchill – guitars and effects
- Michael MacNeil – keyboards and effects
- Derek Forbes – bass guitar
- Mel Gaynor – drums (tracks: 1, 4, 6–9)
- Mike Ogletree – drums (tracks: 2, 5, 6), percussion
- Kenny Hyslop – drums (track: 3)

Additional musicians

- Sharon Campbell – girl's voice (tracks: 2, 7)
- Herbie Hancock – keyboard solo (track: 8)

Technical

- Peter Walsh – producer, engineer, arrangements
- Keith 'Richard' Nixon – tape operator
- George Chambers – tape operator
- Francis Xavier Gallagher – tape operator
- Malcolm Garrett, Assorted iMaGes – album sleeve
- Jamie Morgan – photography

== Charts ==
=== Weekly charts ===
Chart (1982–83)	Peak position
Australian Albums (Kent Music Report)	8
Canadian Albums (RPM)	57
Dutch Albums (Album Top 100)	31
New Zealand Albums (RMNZ)	2
Norwegian Albums (VG-lista)	17
Swedish Albums (Sverigetopplistan)	9
UK Albums (Official Charts)	3
US Billboard 200	69

Chart (2016)	Peak position
Belgian Albums (Ultratop Flanders)	40
Belgian Albums (Ultratop Wallonia)	21
Dutch Albums (Album Top 100)	65
German Albums (Offizielle Top 100)	47
New Zealand Heatseekers Albums (RMNZ)	10
Scottish Albums (Official Charts)	10
UK Albums (Official Charts)	47

=== Year-end charts ===
Chart (1982)	Position
New Zealand Albums (RMNZ)	13
UK Albums (OCC)	54

Chart (1983)	Position
New Zealand Albums (RMNZ)	50

== Certifications ==
Region	Certification	Certified units/sales
Belgium (BRMA)	Gold	25,000^{*}
Canada (Music Canada)	Gold	50,000^{^}
France (SNEP)	Gold	100,000^{*}
Netherlands (NVPI)	Platinum	100,000^{^}
New Zealand (RMNZ)	Platinum	15,000^{^}
Sweden (GLF)	Gold	50,000^{^}
United Kingdom (BPI)	Platinum	300,000^{^}
Yugoslavia	—	10,060
^{*} Sales figures based on certification alone.^{^} Shipments figures based on certification alone.
