= Cherisse Osei =

English drummer (born 1986)

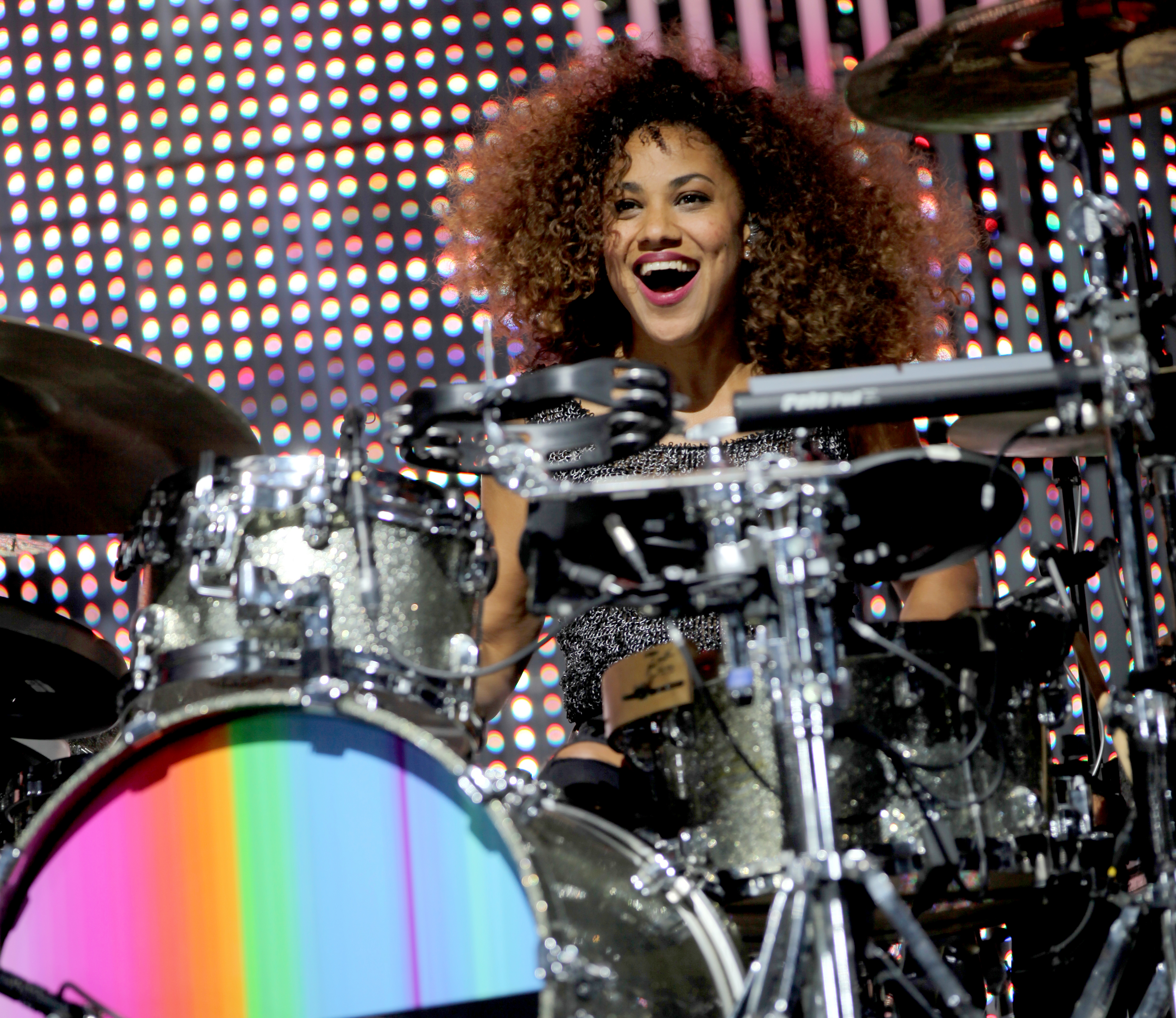
- Osei playing with Simple Minds in 2018

Background information
- Born: 23 December 1986 (age 39)
- Origin: London, England
- Genres: New wave; rock; pop; heavy metal
- Occupation: Musician
- Instruments: Drums, percussion, vocals
- Website: www.cherisseosei.com

Cherisse Osei (born 23 December 1986) is an English drummer. She has been the drummer for the band Simple Minds since 2017. Osei has also played with Mantas, The Faders, Paloma Faith, Bryan Ferry, Kelly Jones, and Mika. In 2018, Osei won first place in the ‘Live Session Drummer’ category for Rhythm magazine's Music Radar polls. As a member of The Faders, Osei appeared on the series Veronica Mars. She cites John Bonham, Sheila E., Steve Gadd, Levon Helm, Tony Williams, and James Gadson as influences.

== Early life ==
Osei grew up interested in becoming an actress or dancer but her parents' interest in music exposed her to "funk, jazz, hip hop and soul" and cultivated an interest in music. At the age of five she received a "pink Mickey Mouse drum kit" from her uncle: although it was her first exposure to drumming, it would only resonate later, at the age of 11, when a drum club was organized in her school and she felt compelled to permanently take the instrument up. By the age of 12, Osei had started playing in bands. When Osei was 15, she worked at a local music store in Wembley, which she credits with giving her exposure to drummers she "looked up to."

== Musical career ==
Osei was the drummer for The Faders from 2004 through 2006. The band was signed to Polydor and released the singles "No Sleep Tonight" and "Jump", reaching numbers 13 and 21 in the UK Singles Chart, respectively. The Faders appeared on Veronica Mars and their music was featured on the show's soundtrack.

In 2004, she recorded the drums on former Venom guitarist Jeffrey "Mantas" Dunn's album Zero Tolerance.

From 2006 through 2012 Osei played drums on Mika's studio work and tours. Her work with Mika led to appearances on Good Morning America, The Tonight Show with Jay Leno, Jimmy Kimmel Live, South by South West, Coachella Valley Music and Arts Festival, Fuji Rock Festival, Glastonbury Festival, and V Festival. During this period, she played drums in the 2008 Beijing Paralympics closing ceremony, performing a commissioned piece by composer Philip Sheppard in the Beijing National Stadium, an event that reached 1.5 billion TV viewers.

In 2012, Osei began working with Bryan Ferry and Paloma Faith. She was featured with these artists on Late Night with David Letterman and The Tonight Show with Jay Leno.

In 2016, Osei joined the band Simple Minds for their "acoustic phase" and recorded the album Acoustic with the band. In early 2017 Simple Minds embarked on a full production tour in Australia and New Zealand, drummer Mel Gaynor's last tour with the band before Osei rejoined and replaced him for a stripped down, acoustic tour the remainder of the year. Osei appeared on three tracks of the 2018 album Walk Between Worlds (the album was recorded before, during, and after the acoustic tours and the Acoustic album release) and joined the band as their full-time drummer for the promotional tour. The tour, which launched in Glasgow, Scotland, and included the first North American shows for the band in five years, was met with praise: The Guardian credited the band with sounding "less blokey," "modern and impressively energised." As of 2019, Simple Minds has been recording material for a new album with Osei, aiming for a 2021 release. That became the album Direction of the Heart, released in October 2022, three tracks on which Osei played.

In 2019, Osei joined Kelly Jones on his third solo tour. Her first performances with Jones took place on 1 June at Usher Hall, in Edinburgh, Scotland.
