= Jez Coad =

British record producer and musician

Jez Coad (born London, England) is an English record producer and musician. He has played and toured with his band, The Surfing Brides.

Coad produced the 2005 album, Black & White 050505, by the Scottish rock group Simple Minds. Coad wrote and arranged parts of the album, and worked with Bob Clearmountain in the mixing. Coad then went on to produce their following album Graffiti Soul.

He continued working with the Simple Minds singer Jim Kerr, on the Lostboy! AKA Jim Kerr project in which he produced, wrote, and played. This culminated in a 2010 European tour where Coad played guitar.

He also produced the Andrew Strong album, Gypsy's Kiss. Coad worked extensively with the Gutter Brothers, producing: Isometric Boogie, Gone to the Dogs, The Failsafe, Already Dead, and recently El Krusho. They also worked together on the soundtrack for the Christmas episode of Only Fools and Horses, "Miami Twice" for BBC Television. In addition, Coad produced the album, Sparky's Dinner, by The Surfing Brides for I.R.S. Records.

Coad has had tracks in various films such as Austin Powers, The Match, and Staggered (with Martin Clunes) in which he appeared with The Surfing Brides.
