= Ti.Pi.Cal. =

- Origin: Gela, Italy
- Genres: Eurodance
- Years active: 1993–1999, 2001–2006, 2011–present
- Labels: EMI; Universal Music Group; Do It Yourself

Ti.Pi.Cal. is an Italian Eurodance project founded in 1993. The group's name derives from the initials of the last names of the three founding members, the Sicilian producers and DJs Daniele Tignino (Ti.), Riccardo Piparo (Pi.) and Vincenzo Callea (Cal.). Their major hits were the songs "Round and Round" and "The Colour Inside", which both ranked number one on the Italian singles hit parade, respectively in February and between July and August 1995. In 1996, the members of the group started a side project called Kasto.

== Discography ==
=== Albums ===
- 1996 - Colourful (EMI)
- 2011 - Stars (Universal)

=== Singles ===
- 1993 - "I Know"
- 1993 - "Illusion"
- 1995 - "Round and Around"
- 1995 - "The Colour Inside"
- 1996 - "It Hurts"
- 1996 - "I Would Like"
- 1996 - "Why Me?"
- 1996 - "Gimme Love" (as Kasto)
- 1997 - "Hidden Passion"
- 1997 - "Live for Today"
- 1998 - "Follow Your Heart"
- 1999 - "Music Is My Life"
- 2001 - "Is This the Love"
- 2006 - "What I Like"
- 2011 - "Round and Around"
- 2011 - "Stars"
- 2011 - "Where Is the World"
- 2012 - "Could Be You"
- 2013 - "Tomorrow"
- 2015 - "The Colour Inside (20th Anniversary)"
