= Glittering Prize =

Single by Simple Minds

from the album New Gold Dream (81–82–83–84)
- B-side: "Glittering Prize Theme"
- Released: 20 August 1982
- Recorded: April 1982 – July 1982
- Genre: Pop rock; sophisti-pop
- Length: 4:02
- Label: Virgin
- Songwriters: Jim Kerr, Charlie Burchill, Derek Forbes and Mick MacNeil
- Producer: Peter Walsh

Simple Minds singles chronology
| "Promised You A Miracle" (1982) | "Glittering Prize" (1982) | "Someone Somewhere in Summertime" (1982) |

"Glittering Prize" is a 1982 single released by the Scottish rock band Simple Minds, as the second single from their fifth studio album New Gold Dream (81–82–83–84) (1982). The song reached number 16 in the United Kingdom, however it was more successful in Australia, New Zealand and Norway, where it reached the top 10.

A compilation album, released by Simple Minds in 1992, is named after the song, and is entitled Glittering Prize 81/92.

== Background ==
In an interview with Smash Hits magazine in 1982, lead singer Jim Kerr explained that the meaning behind "Glittering Prize", stating that the song is "about getting a glimpse of something and going out on a chase for it against all the odds. If you're after something, or something's really beckoning, just go for it. The glittering prize could be a girl, or a dream". The band are known to have claimed that they were not particularly favourable of the song when initially recorded and released, however, later claimed that the song had "grown on them".

Speaking to the Sunday Herald in 2008, Jim Kerr explained that following turning up late to one of the bands rehearsals, the band began playing "Glittering Prize" without him. Kerr explained that he "just heard the track in a way I'd never heard it before and it sounded fantastic. And it struck me that it was a much better pop song than I ever knew it was. And I was really, really delighted".

== Composition and legacy ==
Musically, "Glittering Prize" has been described as "bass groove with keyboard flourishes" which combine together to create "an evocative love song".

"Glittering Prize" was recorded by Peter Walsh at The Townhouse and Manor Studios along with the rest of the New Gold Dream album. The song also features on a live album release entitled New Gold Dream – Live From Paisley Abbey, broadcast on Sky Arts Greatest Albums Live series in honour of the albums 40th year of release.

== Critical reception ==
Classic Rock History claims that James Morrison influences are evident on "Glittering Prize", stating that the bass line featured throughout the song was a highlight. In a ranking of the top eleven Simple Minds songs, they ranked "Glittering Prize" as number sixth.

== Music video ==
The video continuously alternates between two main stages. The first one is set in a golden room where three of the band members - Jim Kerr, Charlie Burchill, and Mick MacNeil, all dressed in black - perform the song. The other stage is set in a dark, museum-like room, under the surveillance of a napping security guard, and featuring hanging portraits of the band members' faces made of gold. For unknown reasons, bassist Derek Forbes does not appear in the video.

A story unfolds in this latter stage as a young woman in a bikini and whose body is all painted in gold, stealthily penetrating the room and reaching out to a sarcophagus within which lies a pharaoh version of Kerr. After having touched his face and brought the other band members back to life she then drives away with them in a car. As the guard realises the burglary, the woman, now in the golden room, rests in a long chair and sips on a cocktail before the video ends.

== Track listing ==
=== UK 7" vinyl ===
A – "Glittering Prize" – 3:58
B – "Glittering Prize" (Theme) – 4:03

=== Europe 12", 45 RPM, Single ===
A – "Glittering Prize (Club Mix)" – 4:57
B1 – "Glittering Prize" (Theme) (Instrumental) – 4:57
B2 – "Promised You A Miracle" – 3:59

== Chart performance ==
| Chart (1982) | Peak position |
|---|---|
| Australia (Kent Music Report) | 9 |
| Ireland (IRMA) | 11 |
| New Zealand (Recorded Music NZ) | 4 |
| Norway (VG-lista) | 8 |
| Sweden (Sverigetopplistan) | 11 |
| United Kingdom (CIN) | 16 |
