= Promised You a Miracle =

Single by Simple Minds

from the album New Gold Dream (81–82–83–84)
- B-side: "Theme for Great Cities"
- Released: April 2, 1982
- Recorded: February 12-14, 1982
- Studio: The Town House, London
- Genre: Pop rock; sophisti-pop
- Length: 3:59
- Label: Virgin
- Songwriters: Jim Kerr; Charlie Burchill; Derek Forbes; Mick MacNeil
- Producer: Peter Walsh

Simple Minds singles chronology
"I Travel (reissue)" (1982)	"Promised You a Miracle" (1982)	"Glittering Prize" (1982)

"Promised You a Miracle" is a 1982 song by Scottish band Simple Minds and was released as the first single from their fifth studio album New Gold Dream (81–82–83–84). It was the band's first chart hit in the UK, reaching #13 in the UK singles chart and charting for 11 weeks. Their previous nine UK singles yielded no Top 40 hits in that country although some had sold well in Scotland.

== Background ==
It was the only song on the album that included Kenny Hyslop as the studio session drummer. Mike Ogletree and Mel Gaynor contributed for the other eight tracks. The song triggered a prolonged period of commercial success for the band, during which they yielded 21 original UK hit singles in a row, up to and including 1998's "Glitterball" from the album Neapolis. It also enabled them to make their debut on the British music television show Top of the Pops.

The music video, directed by Steve Barron, features the band members playing amidst colour television imagery, interspersed with an uncredited female model passing through an airport X-ray and sunbathing. A live version from the album Live in the City of Light was released in 1987. The video was a simulated live performance filmed in London's east end. Directed by John Scarlett-Davis and produced by Nick Verden.

== Style ==
"Promised You a Miracle" is a dance track which is driven by a combination of "deep electronic beats" from the keyboards of Mick MacNeil and a "deft hook line and riff" courtesy of Charlie Burchill's guitar play. The song was inspired by a funk band that drummer Kenny Hyslop had recorded from an American radio station on a tape. The band became fascinated by a brass riff they heard and worked on the idea that eventually became the riff on "Promised You a Miracle", and, inspired to summon up the positive feel of the music, Jim Kerr wrote the lyrics to the song. It was considered by Kerr to be the first "pure pop" song written by the band, as their first attempt to craft a song specifically for radio listeners.

The song is considered to be a bridging point between the atmospheric and "echo-laden" prog-pop sound of their previous album Sons and Fascination and the stadium pop-rock of the band's later years, due to the clean, crisp production of the band's new producer Peter Walsh, which AllMusic notes gives it a "brash pop edge".

== Release ==
"Promised You a Miracle" was released as a single in April 1982 during the second leg of the band's Sons and Fascination Tour, where the song was performed live. As the band at that point had not recorded any other new material, the instrumental track "Theme for Great Cities" was lifted from their 1981 album Sister Feelings Call as the b-side of the single. The 12" release also featured an instrumental remix of "Seeing Out the Angel" from the Sons and Fascination album. The cover, designed by Malcolm Garrett, featured a still from the "Sweat in Bullet" video.

== Critical reception ==
"Promised You a Miracle" has been praised by many critics as one of Simple Minds' strongest songs. Cashbox called it "a cute attempt by this English outfit (sic) to boogie with the best of them." Dave Thompson of AllMusic noted its "funky bass line", "bright melody", and "splashy keyboard hook". Dave Simpson in The Guardian referred to the song as a "showcase of early-80s optimism" with a "wistful edge".

A feature in a 2002 edition of Uncut by David Stubbs said: "What's so great about this track, and indeed 'Big Sleep', isn't just its combination of stinging riff with delicate mosaic musical colouring, but its subtle rhythmical patterns, which are a feature of the whole album". A later Uncut review described the song as a "teetering moment of pop promise they could never surpass".

== Charts ==
=== Weekly charts ===
Chart (1982)	Peak position
Australia (Kent Music Report)	10
Belgium (Ultratop 50 Flanders)	31
Irish Singles Chart	25
Netherlands (Dutch Top 40)	24
Netherlands (Single Top 100)	25
New Zealand (Recorded Music NZ)	9
Sweden (Sverigetopplistan)	17
UK (Official Charts Company)	13
U.S. Billboard Hot Dance Club Play	65

Chart (1987)	Peak position
France (SNEP)	62
Irish Singles Chart	8
Italy Airplay (Music & Media)	17
Netherlands (GfK Dutch Chart)	55
UK (Official Charts Company)	19

=== Year-end charts ===
Chart (1982)	Position
Australia (Kent Music Report)	89

== Track listing ==
=== 7" single ===
- Virgin VS 448
1. "Promised You a Miracle" – 3:59
2. "Theme for Great Cities" – 5:50

=== 12" single ===
- Virgin VS 488-12
1. "Promised You a Miracle" (Extended) – 4:49
2. "Themes for Great Cities" – 5:50
3. "Seeing Out the Angel" (Instrumental) – 6:32
