= 1859 in Belgium =

- Decades: 1830s; 1840s; 1850s; 1860s; 1870s
- See also: Other events of 1859; List of years in Belgium

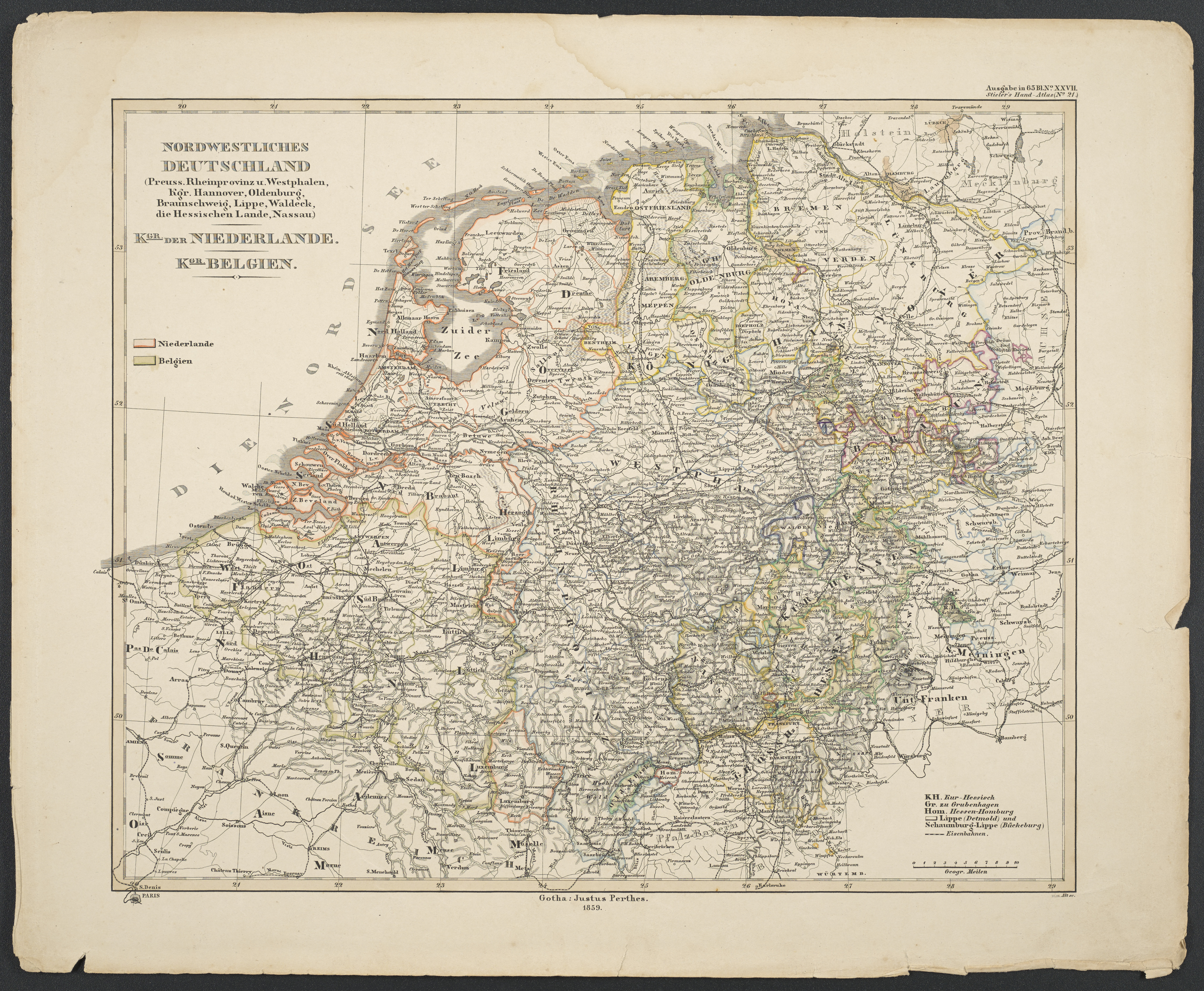
Map of north-western Germany with Belgium and the Netherlands (1859)

Events in the year 1859 in Belgium.

== Incumbents ==
Monarch: Leopold I
Head of government: Charles Rogier

== Events ==
- Fabrique d'armes Émile et Léon Nagant established in Liège
- Railway line from Namur to Arlon completed
- 18 April – Five-year commercial treaty with France (1854) extended for two more years.
- 14 June – Partial legislative elections
- 19 July – Auguste Orts replaces Pierre-Théodore Verhaegen as speaker of the Chamber of Representatives.
- 9 August – Modeste Decroix (in religion Fr François) and Louis-Joseph Miroux (in religion Br François), both of Scourmont Priory, condemned to twenty years and ten years hard labour respectively on multiple counts of sexual assault.
- 31 August – Belgian Chamber of Representatives votes to fortify Antwerp as a National Redoubt.
- 3 November – Celebration of the 25th anniversary of the founding of the Catholic University of Leuven.
- 24 November – Breve of Pope Pius IX congratulating the Catholic University of Leuven on its twenty-fifth anniversary.

== Art and architecture ==
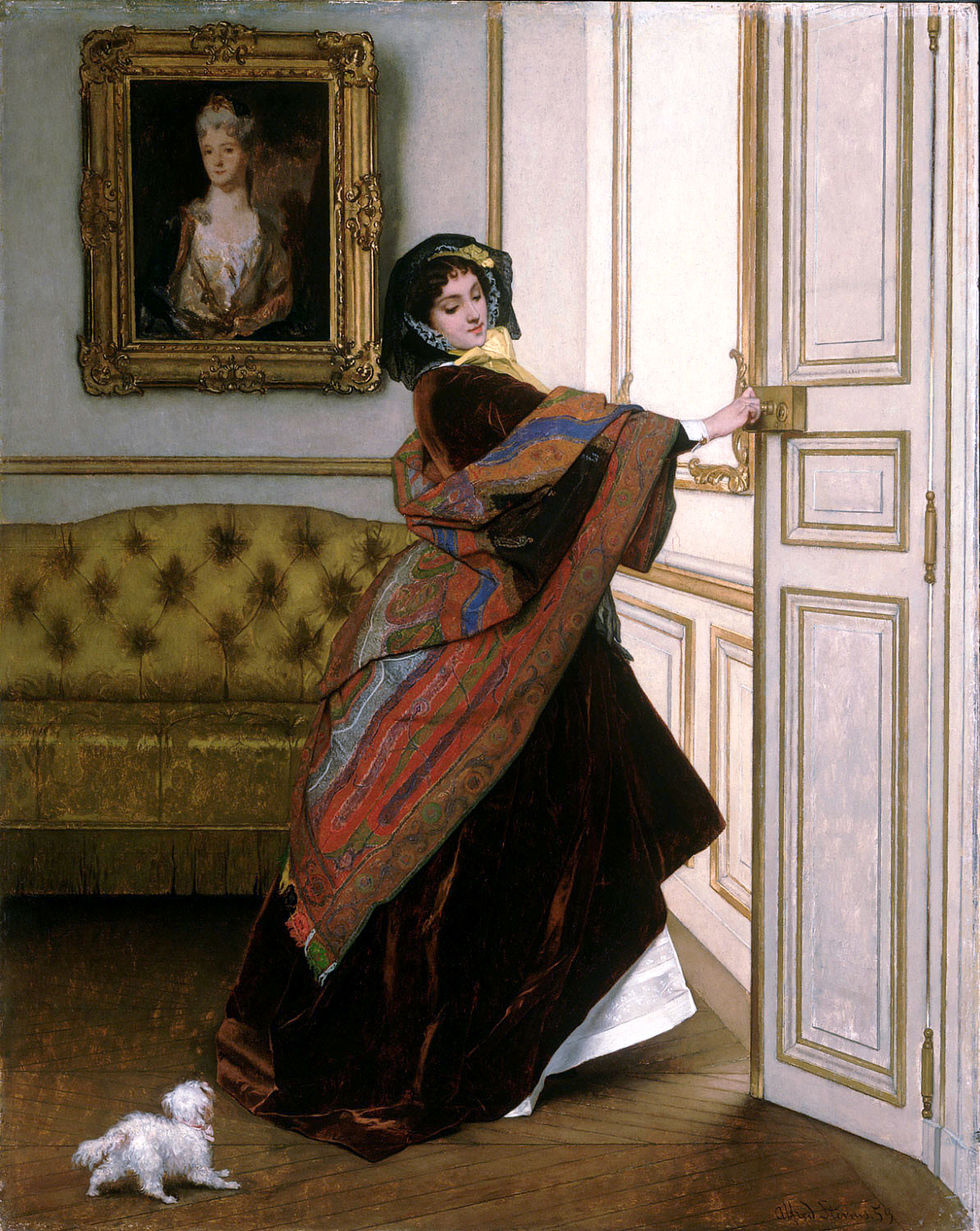
Alfred Stevens, Will you come out with me, Fido? (1859)

Paintings

- Alfred Stevens, Will you come out with me, Fido?

== Publications ==
Periodicals

- Almanach de poche de Bruxelles (Brussels, Tircher)
- Annales de pomologie belge et étrangère, vol. 7.
- Annuaire de l'Académie royale de Belgique, vol. 25
- Annuaire de la noblesse de Belgique, vol. 13, edited by Isidore de Stein d'Altenstein
- Annuaire statistique et historique belge, vol. 6, edited by Auguste Scheler
- La Belgique, 8
- La Belgique Horticole, vol. 9.
- Bibliographie de la Belgique, ou Catalogue général de l'imprimerie et de la librairie belges, vol. 22 (Brussels, Charles Muquardt)
- Bulletins de l'Académie royale des sciences et belles-lettres de Bruxelles (Brussels, Hayez).
- Bulletin et annales de l'Académie d'archéologie de Belgique, vol. 6
- Collection de précis historiques, vol. 8, edited by Edouard Terwecoren S.J.
- Journal de l'armée belge, vol. 17
- Journal d'horticulture pratique de la Belgique
- Le Moniteur Belge
- Recueil consulaire contenant les rapports commerciaux
- Recueil des lois et arrêtés royaux de la Belgique, vol. 11

Reports and monographs

- XIVe exposition nationale et triennale de Gand. Salon de 1859. Notice sur les tableaux et objets d'arts, exposés à l'ancienne église des PP. Dominicains (Ghent, Vanderhaeghen)
- Charles Bormann, The Shrapnel Shell in England and in Belgium with Some Reflections on the Use of this Projectile in the Late Crimean War; a Historico-technical Sketch (Brussels, Librarie européenne)
- Jules Malou, La question monétaire (Brussels, 1859)
- Edmond Speelman, Belgium Marianum: Histoire du culte de Marie en Belgique y compris l'ancien territoire de Lille, de Douai, de Cambrai, etc.: calendrier belge de la Sainte Vierge (Pairs and Tournai, Casterman)
- Jean Stecher, Flamands et Wallons (Liège, F. Renard)

Literature

- Frans de Cort, Liederen, tweede reeks (Antwerp)

== Births ==
- 10 January – Léon Du Bois, organist (died 1935)
- 19 January – Marie Nizet, writer (died 1922)
- 2 April – Léon Rom, colonial officer (died 1924)
- 17 April – Charles van den Eycken, painter (died 1923)
- 19 May – Célestin Demblon, politician (died 1924)
- 25 May – Renée de Merode, noblewoman (died 1941)
- 12 June – Prince Leopold, Duke of Brabant (died 1869)
- 19 August – Hippolyte Delehaye, Bollandist (died 1941)
- 20 September – Cyriel Buysse, playwright (died 1932)
- 7 October – Georgette Meunier, painter (died 1951)
- 4 November – Jules Feller, academician (died 1940)
- 7 November – Paul de Smeth, philatelist (died 1940)
- 11 December – Paul Hankar, architect (died 1901)
- 25 December – Jean-François Heymans, pharmacologist (died 1932)

== Deaths ==
- 3 March – Cornelis Cels (born 1778), painter
- 20 March – Jozef Geirnaert (born 1790), artist
- 22 July – Louis de Potter (born 1786), journalist
- 13 November – Prudens van Duyse (born 1804), writer
