= Celebration =

Celebration or Celebrations may refer to:

== Film, television and theatre ==
- Celebration (musical), by Harvey Schmidt and Tom Jones, 1969
- Celebration (play), by Harold Pinter, 2000
- Celebration (TV series), a Canadian music TV series
- Celebration at Big Sur, or Celebration, a 1969 concert film
- The Celebration, or Festen, a 1998 Danish film
- "Celebration" (Succession), the first episode of the television show Succession

== Music ==
- Celebration (2000s band), a Baltimore-based band
  - Celebration (2006 album), 2006
- Celebration (1970s band), an American band fronted by Mike Love
  - Celebration (1979 album)

=== Albums ===
- Celebration (Bheki Mseleku album), 1991
- Celebration (Deuter album), 1976
- Celebration (DJ BoBo album), 2002
- Celebration (Eric Kloss album), 1979
- Celebration (Irène Schweizer and Hamid Drake album), 2021
- Celebration (Janie Frickie album), 1987
- Celebration (Julian Lloyd Webber album), 2001
- Celebration (Madonna album), or the song title, 2009
  - Celebration: The Video Collection
- Celebration (Simple Minds album), 1982
- Celebration (Smokie album), 1994
- Celebration (United DJ's vs. Pandora album), 2007
- Celebration, by Ilegales, 2011
- Celebration, by Olsen Brothers, 2005
- Celebration, by Osibisa, 1980
- Celebration, by Roger Whittaker, 1993
- Celebration!, by The Wiggles, 2012
- Celebration – Forty Years of Rock, by Uriah Heep, 2009
- Celebration – The Anniversary Album, by Johnny Mathis, 1981
- Celebrations, by Bob Degen, 1968
- Celebration (Andrew Cyrille album), 1975

=== Songs ===
- "Celebration" (AnnaGrace song), 2010
- "Celebration" (Kool & the Gang song), 1980, also covered by Kylie Minogue
- "Celebration" (Madonna song), 2009
- "Celebration" (The Game song), 2012
- "Celebration", by Dareysteel, 2014
- "Celebration" (Fun Factory song), 1995
- "Celebration" (Forrest Frank song), 2025
- "Celebration" (Le Sserafim song), 2026
- "Celebration", by Hafdis Huld, from Dirty Paper Cup, 2006
- "Celebration", by Kanye West, from Late Registration, 2005
- "Celebration", by Kendrick Lamar, from Kendrick Lamar, 2009
- "Celebration", by Krokus, from Hardware, 1981
- "Celebration", by Kendrick Lamar from Kendrick Lamar, 2009
- "Celebration", by Lil Gotit, from Hood Baby, 2018
- "Celebration", by Paul McCartney, from Standing Stone, 1997
- "Celebration", by Radwimps, from Weathering with You, 2019
- "Celebration", by They Might Be Giants, from Join Us, 2011
- "Celebration", by Tommy James, 1972
- "Celebration", by Tyga, from Careless World: Rise of the Last King, 2012
- "Celebrations", by Brothers Johnson, from Light Up the Night, 1980
- "A Celebration", by U2, 1982
- "A Celebration", by Joe Satriani from Unstoppable Momentum, 2013
- "Celebration", by Wet Wet Wet, from High on the Happy Side, 1992

=== Concert tours ===
- "Celebration Tour", by No Angels, 2022
- "The Celebration Tour", by Madonna, 2023

== Other uses ==
- Celebration, Florida, a place in the United States
- Celebration High School, a public high school located in Celebration, Florida, United States.
- Celebration (Alaska festival), a biennial Tlingit, Haida and Tsimshian cultural event
- Celebration (ship), a cruise ship, now MS Grand Celebration
- Celebration (Tyeb Mehta), a triptych painting
- 'Celebration', a variety of barley
- Celebration series of art works by Jeff Koons
- Celebration, a type of public performance event created by the American choreographer Marilyn Wood
- Celebrations (confectionery), a miniature chocolate bar collection by Mars
- Celebrations Group, a chain of British greeting cards stores
- McDowell's No.1 Celebration, or Celebration Rum, a rum by United Spirits Limited of India

== See also ==
- Celebrate (disambiguation)
- Celebration of life (disambiguation)
