= Funeral (disambiguation) =

A funeral is a ceremony marking a person's death.

Funeral may also refer to:

== Film ==
- The Funeral (1984 film), a film by Juzo Itami
- The Funeral (1996 film), a film by Abel Ferrara

== Television ==
- "The Funeral" (Brooklyn Nine-Nine), a television episode
- "Funeral" (Glee), a television episode
- "Funeral" (Peep Show), a television episode
- "Funeral" (Starstruck), a television episode
- "The Funeral", an episode of One Day at a Time

== Music ==
- Funeral (band), a Norwegian doom metal band
- Funeral (Arcade Fire album), a 2004 album by Arcade Fire
- Funeral (Lil Wayne album), a 2020 album by Lil Wayne
- "Funeral" (Phoebe Bridgers song), 2017
- "The Funeral" (Band of Horses song), 2006
- "The Funeral" (Hank Williams song), 1950
- "The Funeral" (Yungblud song), 2022
- "Funeral", a song on Iced Earth's 1990 album Iced Earth
- "Funeral", a song on The Mekon's 1991 album The Curse of the Mekons
- "Funeral", a song on Devin Townsend's 1997 album Ocean Machine: Biomech
- "Funeral", a song on Lukas Graham's 2015 album Lukas Graham
- "Funeral", a song on Phoebe Bridgers' 2017 album Stranger in the Alps
- "Funeral", a song on Zara Larsson's 2017 album So Good
- "funeral", a 2025 Ayesha Erotica song
- "The Funeral", a song on King Gizzard & the Lizard Wizard's 2022 album Omnium Gatherum
- "The Funeral", a song on The Staple Singers 1965 album Freedom Highway
- "The Funeral", a song on Staind's 1996 album Tormented

== Literature ==
- "The Funeral", a 1939 short story by William March in the Some Like Them Short collection
- "The Funeral", a 1972 short story by Kate Wilhelm in the Again, Dangerous Visions anthology

== Other uses ==
- The Funeral (painting), an 1867–1870 painting by Édouard Manet
- The Funeral (Grosz), a 1917–1918 painting by George Grosz

== See also ==
- Celebration of life (disambiguation)
- Funeral Games (disambiguation)
- Funeral party (disambiguation)
- Funeral Song (disambiguation)
