= Chant funèbre =

Chant funèbre may refer to:

- Chant funèbre for cello and orchestra, by Albert Huybrechts, 1926
- Chant funèbre, Op. 9 by Albéric Magnard, 1895
- Chant funèbre, by Jacques Stehman (1912–1975)
- Chant funèbre (Stravinsky) (Погребальная песня; 'Funeral Song'), by Igor Stravinsky, 1908
- Chant funèbre à la mémoire de Féraud, Étienne Méhul (1763–1817)
- Chant funèbre a la memoire des jeunes femmes defuntes, Op.37 by Charles Koechlin

== See also ==
- Funeral Song (disambiguation)
- Grande symphonie funèbre et triomphale, by Berlioz
- Chant funèbre d'une mère..., French revolutionary song
