= Deathmatch =

Deathmatch commonly refers to:

- A particularly brutal type of hardcore wrestling
- Deathmatch (video games), a free-for-all video game mode

Death Match may also refer to:

== Arts, entertainment, and media ==
- Tom Clancy's Net Force Explorers: Death Match (2003), a young adult novel series
- Death Match, a 2004 novel by Lincoln Child
- Death Match, a 2001 album by Garlic Boys
- Deathmatch, a comic book miniseries by Boom! Studios
- Celebrity Deathmatch, an American adult animated series

== Sports ==
- The Death Match, a wartime football match in 1942 in Kiev between a local team and Nazi soldiers

== See also ==
- Funeral Games (disambiguation)
- Game of Death (disambiguation)
