= Funeral Song (disambiguation) =

"Funeral Song", Op.5, is a composition written in 1908 by Igor Stravinsky.

Funeral Song may also refer to:

- "Funeral Song", a 2013 song by Fast Romantics
- "Funeral Song", a song by Sleater-Kinney from the 2002 album One Beat
- "Funeral Song", a song by The Rasmus from the 2003 album Dead Letters
- "Funeral Song", a traditional Solomon Islands composition, featured on Spirit of Melanesia by David Fanshawe, sampled by Björk in her 2012 song "Mutual Core"
- "Parachutes (Funeral Song)", a song by Mates of State from the 2003 album Team Boo

== See also ==
- Chant funèbre (disambiguation)
- Funeral (disambiguation)#Music
