= Celebrate You =

Celebrate You may refer to:

- "Celebrate You", song by Corbin Bleu from Speed of Light
- "Celebrate You", song by Kylie Minogue Disco

== See also ==
- Celebrate (disambiguation)
