= Celebration of life (disambiguation) =

A celebration of life is a type of funeral that focuses on the life that one lived.

Celebration of life or A Celebration of Life may also refer to:

- "A Celebration of Life", the 11th episode of The Real Housewives of Beverly Hills season 13
- Celebration of Life, a play by Sachin Gupta
- Celebration of Life (sculpture), a bronze sculpture by Alfred Tibor, 2004

== See also ==
- Celebration (disambiguation)
- Celebration of Life Monument, a visual art display in Salt Lake City, Utah, United States
- Funeral (disambiguation)
- In Celebration of Life, an album by Yanni, 1991
