= Albert Huybrechts =

Belgian composer (1899–1938)

Albert Huybrechts (12 February 1899 in Dinant – 21 February 1938 in Brussels) was a Belgian composer.

== Life ==
Albert Huybrechts was born into a musical family. His father, Joseph-Jacques, was a double bassist in the orchestra of the Royal Theatre of La Monnaie, and his great grand-uncle was the cellist Adrien-François Servais.

Huybrechts enrolled at the Royal Conservatory of Brussels at age 11, where he studied under Joseph Jongen, P. Marchand, and Léon Du Bois. In 1915, Huybtechts won an award for oboe playing at the Conservatory.

In 1920, Huybrechts' father died; he left the composer a small inheritance. He won a prize for fugue with Jongen in 1922, and in 1926 his String Quartet No. 1 won first prize at the Frost-Coolidge Music Festival in Ojai, California. A few days later, his Violin Sonata won the Elizabeth Sprague Coolidge award.

The Wall Street crash of 1929 depleted Huybrechts' inheritance; a thwarted love affair in the 1930s added further stress. In January 1938, at Jean Absil's recommendation, Huybrechts was appointed as a junior lecturer in harmony at the Royal Conservatory of Brussels. On 21 February, he died unexpectedly of kidney failure.

== Works ==
Stage

- Agamemnon, Incidental Music after Aeschylus for tenor, baritone, male chorus and orchestra (1932–1933)

Orchestra

- David, Poème symphonique (1923)
- Poème féerique (1923)
- Sérénade en 3 mouvements (1929)
- Chant d'angoisse (1930)
- Nocturne (1931)

Concertante

- Chant funèbre for cello and orchestra (1926); also for cello and piano
- Concertino for cello and orchestra (1932)

Chamber music

- String Quartet No. 1 (1924)
- Sonata for violin and piano (1925)
- Chant funèbre for cello and piano (1926); also orchestrated
- Trio for flute, viola and piano (1926)
- String Quartet No. 2 (1927)
- Sextuor (Pastorale) for 2 flute, oboe, clarinet, horn and bassoon (1927)
- Suite for flute, oboe, clarinet, bassoon and piano (1929)
- Divertissement for brass and percussion (1931)
- Pastourelle for cello or viola da gamba and piano (1934)
- Sonatine for flute and viola (1934)
- Piano Trio (1935)
- Quintette à vent (Woodwind Quintet) for flute, oboe, clarinet, horn and bassoon (1936)
- Aesope for string quartet

Organ

- Choral (1930)

Piano

- Sicilienne (1934)

Vocal

- Les roses de Saadi for soprano and piano (1919); words by Marceline Desbordes-Valmore
- Cétait un soir de féeries for soprano and piano (1920); words by Francis Viélé-Griffin
- Chant d'automne for soprano and piano (1920); words by Charles Baudelaire
- Deux poèmes for mezzo-soprano and string quartet (1923); words by Emile Verhaeren
- Horoscopes for soprano and piano (1926); words by Francis James
- Trois poèmes for mezzo-soprano and piano (1928); words by Edgar Allan Poe in translation by Stéphane Mallarmé
- Eldorado for soprano or mezzo-soprano and orchestra (1928); words by Edgar Allan Poe in translation by Stéphane Mallarmé
- Prière pour avoir une femme simple for tenor and piano or orchestra (1934); words by Francis James
- Mirliton for soprano and piano (1934); words by Tristan Corbière

== Discography ==
- David - Serenade for Orchestra - L'Orchestre National De Belgique/René Defossez. Decca BAT 133200, 1950s
- Musique Belge Contemporaine - Gérard Ruymen, André Isselee, Quatuor Rondo, Pauline Marcelle, Raymonde Serverius. Alpha DBM-133 C, 1970s
- Musique Belge Contemporaine - Quatuor Rondo: Raymond Corbeel, René Philippo, Marcel Ancion, Iwein d’Haese, Gisèle Demoulin. Alpha DBM-F182, 1970s
- Sonate Pour Violon Et Piano / Deuxième Quatuor - Clemens Quatacker, Jean-Claude Vanden Eynden, Le Quatuor Quatacker. Deutsche Grammophon 0100 125, 1979
- Sonatas for Violin And Piano - André Gousseau, Mary Elizabeth Sadun. Pavane ADW 7047, 1981
- Sonatas For Violin And Piano - Edith Volckaert, Jean-Claude Vanden Eynden. Queen Elisabeth Competition 1980 038, 1983
- Musique de Chambre - Quatour de l'Opera National de Belgique. Koch Schwann Musica Mundi CD 310 030 H1, 1988
- Shostakovich - Huybrechts - Edith Volckaert, Eugene De Canck. René Gailly CD86 003, 1993
- Chamber Music for Wind Instruments - Wind Ensemble Quintessens. René Gailly CD92 020, 1994
- Sonatine - Sonate - Trio - Marc Grauwels, Jacques Dupriez, Dominique Cornil, Véronique Bogaerts. Syrinx CRS98101, 2000
- Musique de Chambre I - Pierre Amoyal, Marie Hallynck, David Lively, Yuko Shimizu-Amoyal. Cypres CYP4630, 2009
- Musique de Chambre II - Laure Delcampe, Marie Lenormand, Martial Defontaine, Lionel Bams, Quator MP4. Cypres CYP4635, 2011
- Musique de Chambre III - Solistes de l'Orchestre Symphonique de la Monnaie/De Munt. Cypres CYP4639, 2013
- Sonatas for Violin And Piano - Guido De Neve, Jan Michiels. Pavane ADW 7509, 2013
- Huybrechts Chamber Music - Aldo Baerton, Diederick Suys, Frauke Suys, Maiko Inoué. UT3 Records 026, 2016
- Early 20th Century Jewels - Nozomi Kanda, Daniel Rubenstein. DUX CD 1340, 2017
