= Funeral Games (disambiguation) =

Funeral games are athletic contests held in honor of a recently deceased person.

Funeral Games may also refer to:

- Funeral Games (novel), a novel by Mary Renault
- Funeral Games (play), a play by Joe Orton

== See also ==
- Weddings and Funerals, a playground game
- Game of Death (disambiguation)
- Deathmatch (disambiguation)
