= Bheki Mseleku =

South African jazz musician (1955–2008)

Background information
- Born: Bhekumuzi Hyacinth Mseleku; March 3, 1955; Durban, South Africa
- Died: 9 September 2008 (aged 53) London, United Kingdom
- Genres: Jazz
- Occupations: Musician; composer
- Instruments: Piano; saxophone; guitar

Bhekumuzi Hyacinth Mseleku (3 March 1955 – 9 September 2008), commonly known as Bheki Mseleku, was a South African jazz musician. He was a pianist, saxophonist, guitarist, composer, and arranger who was entirely self-taught.

== Biography ==
Mseleku's father was a musician and teacher, and a Cambridge University music graduate, who had religious beliefs that prevented his children from ready access to the family's upright piano in case any of them should pursue something as "devilish" as music. His mother gave him the keys while his father was away, but the piano ended up as firewood one winter's evening. During his childhood, Mseleku suffered the loss of the upper joints of two fingers in his right hand from a go-karting accident. He explained in a 1994 South Bank Show dedicated to him that this was wholly due to the restricted health care available to Black South Africans under apartheid.

Mseleku started his musical career in Johannesburg in 1975 as an electric organ player for an R&B band, Spirits Rejoice. After performing at the Newport Jazz Festival in 1977, Mseleku settled in Botswana for a time, moved to London, England, in the late 1970s, and made an attempt to settle into the jazz scene in Stockholm, Sweden, from 1980 to 1983, but then returned to London. It was not until 1987 that Mseleku made his debut at Ronnie Scott's Jazz Club, playing piano unaccompanied by other musicians, with a tenor saxophone in his lap.

His 1991 album Celebration, which featured Courtney Pine among a number of British players as guests, was nominated for a Mercury Music Prize. After this, Mseleku was taken up by Verve Records for several albums. The first of these featured a number of American players, including Joe Henderson, Abbey Lincoln and Elvin Jones. In 1996, Mseleku won a KORA All Africa Music Award in the category "Best Instrumentalist (Southern Afrika)".

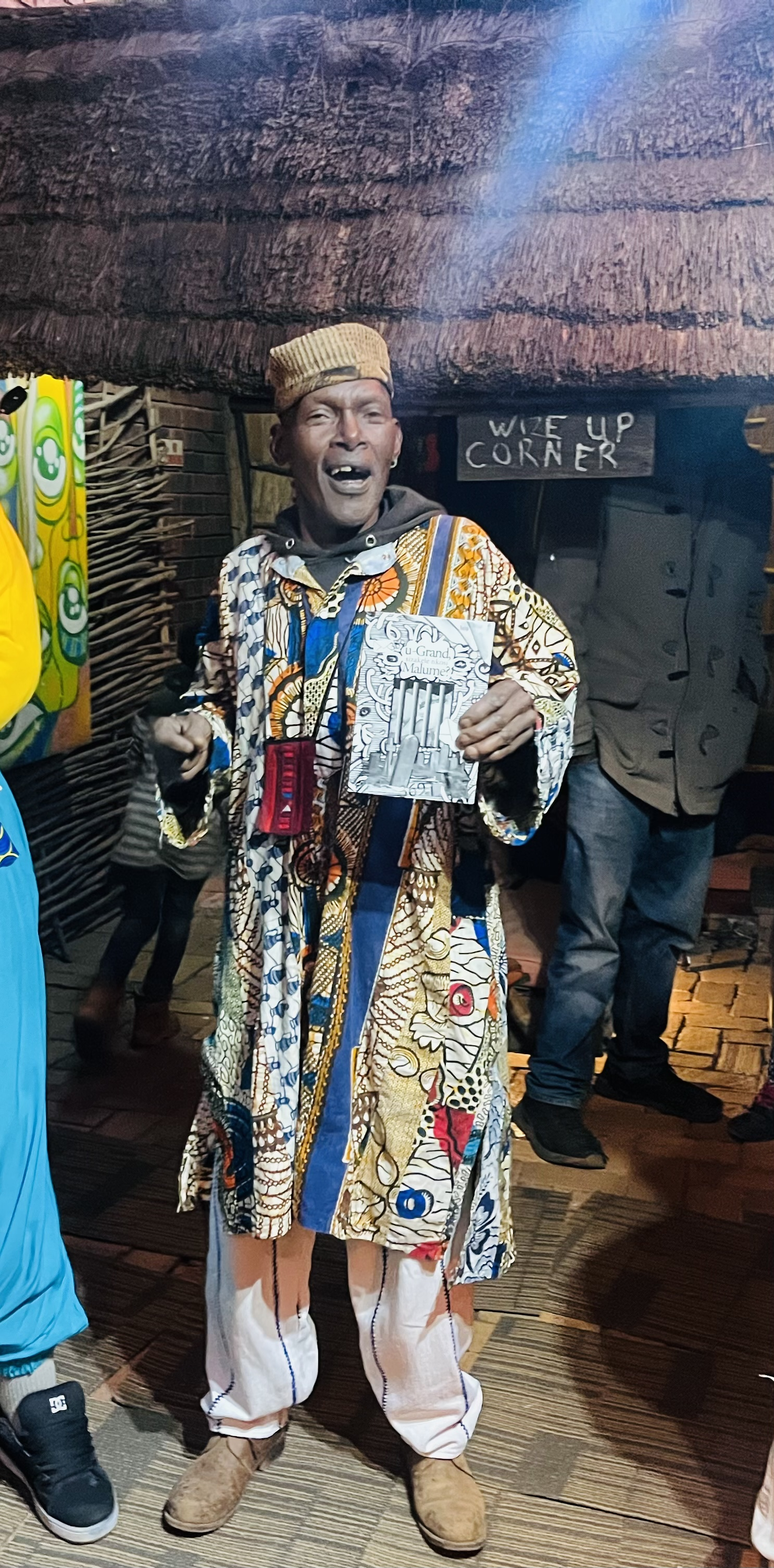
Percussionist Thebe Lipere, who worked with Mseleku, continues to perform in Mofolo, Gauteng, South Africa. (2024)

With Home at Last (2003), the last record released during his lifetime, Mseleku, "a self-confessed 'Citizen of the World'", explored "home" as being "a spiritual construct made up of special people and relationships, those that came along on the long hard road, those that were left behind to be re-visited later".

In 2021, the solo piano recording Beyond the Stars was released posthumously. This album was recorded on 28 November 2003, though none of the six songs were released during Mseleku's lifetime. Beyond The Stars provided what pianist Nduduzo Makhathini described in his liner notes as "a divine summary" of Mseleku's life story: "a sonic pilgrimage from the beautiful and organic landscapes of Durban, to the vibrant energy of London and ultimately toward the inner dimensions of one's being."

Mseleku was diabetic and at one time had been diagnosed as bipolar. He was the father of nine children: Sizwe Mseleku, Duma Mseleku, Maria Mbalentle Mseleku, Victoria Nokuwela Ogunsaya (née Mseleku), Teresa Milewski, Brenda Mseleku, Michael Mseleku, Noel Goldenbaum, and Nirvana Nokwe-Mseleku who was the youngest—Mseleku's departure left a devastating mark on his family. He died in his London flat, having spent most of his last years back in South Africa, but without finding an outlet for his skills there. His home was burgled in 1994, which affected him deeply, due to the loss of the mouthpiece that John Coltrane had used for the recording of A Love Supreme, given to him by Alice Coltrane at Newport.

Over the two years prior to his death, Mseleku had established a new band in London and had made several well received appearances around the country.

== Discography ==
=== As leader ===
- Celebration (World Circuit, 1991)
- Meditations (Verve, 1992)
- Timelessness (Verve, 1994)
- Star Seeding (PolyGram, 1995)
- Beauty of Sunrise (PolyGram, 1997)
- Home at Last (Sheer Sound, 2003)
- Beyond the Stars (Tapestry Works, 2021)

=== As contributing artist ===
- Hugh Masekela, Waiting for the Rain (1985)
- The Rough Guide to the Music of South Africa (World Music Network, 1998)
- Vaughan Hawthorne-Nelson, See You There (TML Records, 1999)
