= Celebrate =

Celebrate may refer to:

== Music ==
=== Albums ===
- Celebrate (Bonnie Tyler album), UK title of Wings, or the title song, 2006
- Celebrate (James Durbin album) or the title song, 2014
- Celebrate – Live, by the Archers, or the title song, 1980
- Celebrate!, by Kool & the Gang, 1980
- Celebrate: The Greatest Hits, by Simple Minds, or the title song (see below), 2013
- Celebrate: The Three Dog Night Story, 1965–1975 or the title song (see below), 1993
- Celebrate, by Hi-5, 2002
- Celebrate, by Tiny Moving Parts, 2016
- Celebrate, by Twice, 2022

=== EPs ===
- Celebrate (EP), by Highlight, or the title song, 2017
- Celebrate – The Night of the Warlock, by Doro Pesch, or the title song, 2008
- Celebrate, by JoJo Siwa, 2019

=== Songs ===
- "Celebrate" (CeCe Peniston song), 2012
- "Celebrate" (Empire of the Sun song), 2014
- "Celebrate" (Mika song), 2012
- "Celebrate" (Three Dog Night song), 1969
- "Celebrate" (Whitney Houston and Jordin Sparks song), 2012
- "Celébrate", by Miki Núñez, 2019
- "Celebrate", by Alex O
- "Celebrate", by Alexandra Stan from Unlocked, 2014
- "Celebrate", by An Emotional Fish, 1989
- "Celebrate", by Ateez from Zero: Fever Part.2, 2021
- "Celebrate", by Black Eyed Peas from Translation, 2020
- "Celebrate", by Brass Construction, 1978
- "Celebrate", by DaBaby from Baby on Baby, 2019
- "Celebrate", by Daria Kinzer, representing Croatia in the Eurovision Song Contest 2011
- "Celebrate", by Dirty Heads from Swim Team, 2017
- "Celebrate", by DJ Khaled from Father of Asahd, 2019
- "Celebrate", by Ingrid Michaelson from It Doesn't Have to Make Sense, 2016
- "Celebrate", by James Arthur from Pisces, 2025
- "Celebrate", by Lake from Ouch!, 1980/1981
- "Celebrate", by Little Dragon from Season High, 2017
- "Celebrate", by Metric from Pagans in Vegas, 2015
- "Celebrate", by Piero Esteriore & The MusicStars, representing Switzerland in the Eurovision Song Contest 2004
- "Celebrate", by Pitbull from Globalization, 2014
- "Celebrate", by Simple Minds from Empires and Dance, 1980
- "Celebrate", by Wiz Khalifa from Khalifa, 2016
- "Celebrate!", by Jonas Brothers from The Album, 2023

== Other uses ==
- Celebrate! Tokyo Disneyland, a 2018–2019 nighttime show
- Celebrate, a Christian magazine edited by Peter Youngren

== See also ==
- Celebration (disambiguation)
- Celebrant (disambiguation)
