= Celebration (Bheki Mseleku album) =

Studio album by Bheki Mseleku
- Released: 1991
- Genre: Jazz
- Label: World Circuit

Bheki Mseleku chronology
Celebration (1991)	Meditations (1992)

Celebration is the debut album by the South African musician Bheki Mseleku. It was on the short list of nominees for the 1992 Mercury Prize. Courtney Pine contributed to the album, which was recorded in two days.

== Critical reception ==
Professional ratings
Review scores
Source	Rating
AllMusic	3/5 stars

The Plain Dealer deemed the album "a serious, heartfelt and a very enjoyable first effort."

AllMusic wrote: "While his percussive, slashing style is reminiscent of McCoy Tyner and Don Pullen, [Mseleku] has his own voicings, phrasing, rhythmic drive, and sound."

== Track listing ==
No.	Title	Length
1.	"Celebration"
2.	"One for All – All for One"
3.	"Angola"
4.	"Blues for Afrika"
5.	"The Age of Inner Knowing"
6.	"The Messenger"
7.	"Joy"
8.	"Supreme Love"
9.	"Cycle"
10.	"Closer to the Source"
