= Charles van den Eycken =

Belgian painter (1859–1923)

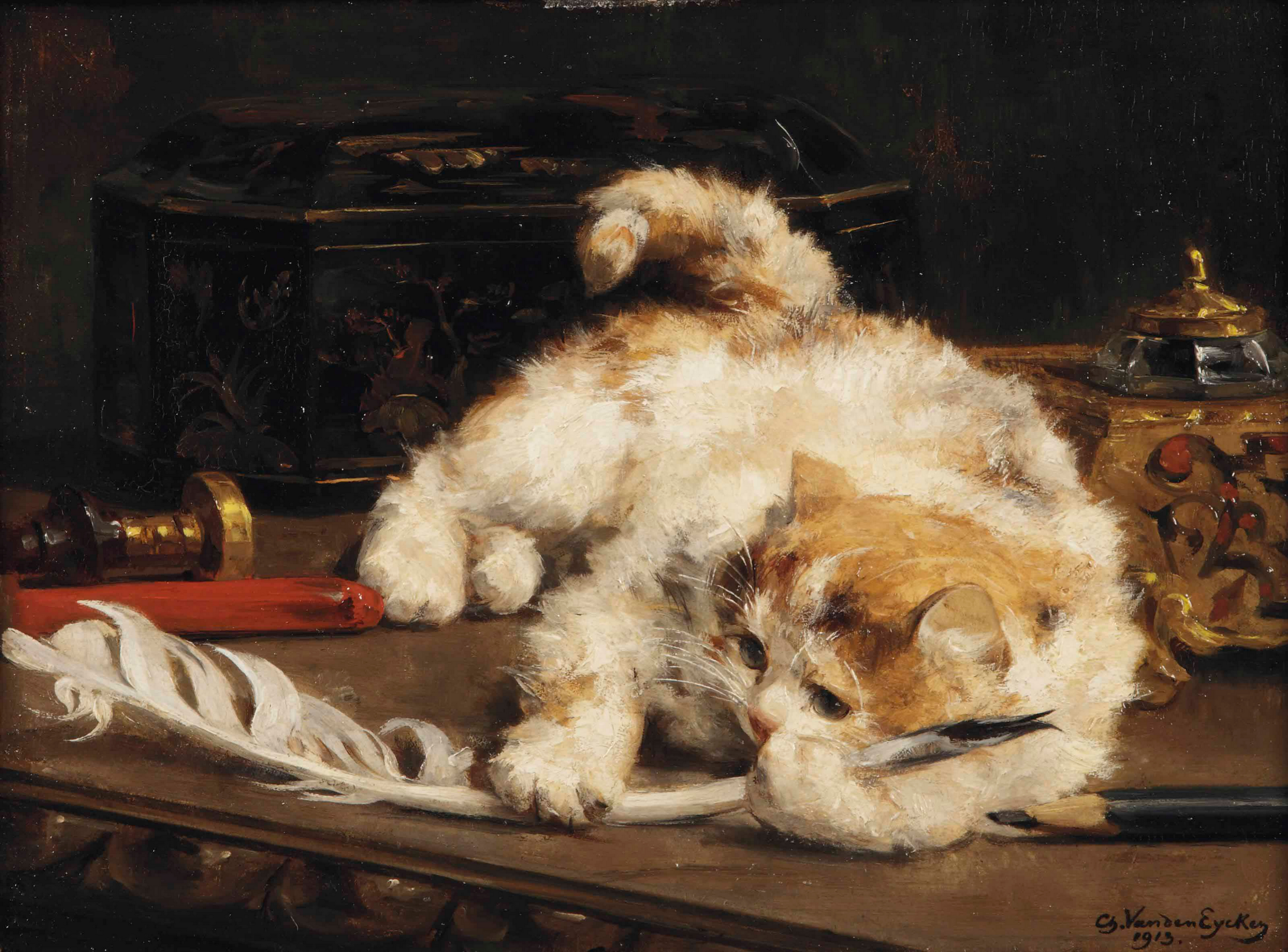
- The little writer
- Born: Charles van den Eycken; 17 April 1859; Brussels, Belgium
- Died: 27 December 1923 (aged 64) n/a
- Known for: Animal painting
- Parent: Charles (father)
- Relatives: Frans (grandfather)

Charles van den Eycken or Charles van den Eycken the younger (17 April 1859 – 27 December 1923), sometimes known as Duchêne, was a well-known Belgian painter specializing in pictures of interiors, dogs and cats.

== Life ==
Van den Eycken was born in Brussels. His grandfather Frans was a decorative painter and his father, also called Charles, a successful painter of landscapes in the 17th-century Dutch style.

Van den Eycken was first a pupil of his father. He subsequently studied with Joseph Stevens, a realist animal painter, at the Académie des Beaux-Arts in Brussels. He later also studied at the Academy of Louvain. From 1881 he exhibited regularly in the Salons of Brussels, Liège, Ghent and Antwerp, as well as in the Netherlands, Germany and Spain. He painted several pictures for Queen Marie-Henriette of Belgium. He was a member of the artist group "l'Essor" and obtained several medals.

Van den Eycken's usual signature was Ch. van den Eycken or C. van den Eycken. He sometimes signed his works Charles Duchêne.

Van den Eycken painted dogs and cats engaged in all kinds of activities. He also painted some portraits of dogs. He died in Brussels.

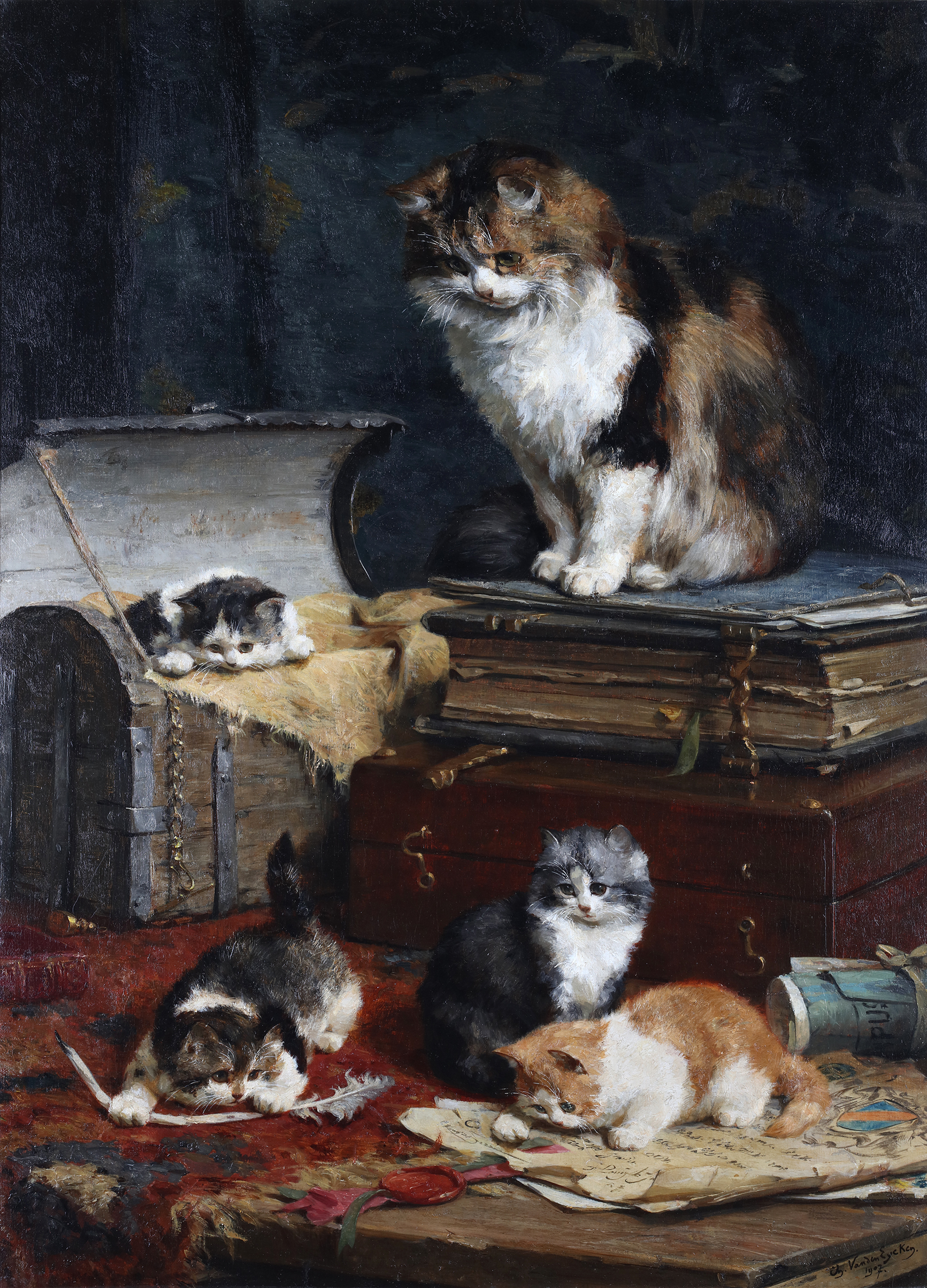
The playfull four (1907)

== Bibliography ==
- Akoun, Jacky-Armand, 2012: La côte des peintres. Editions Babylone
- Bénézit, E., 1999: Dictionnaire critique des peintres, sculpteurs, dessinateurs et graveurs. Paris: Gründ
- Berko, P. & V., 1981: Dictionary of Belgian painters born between 1750 & 1875
