= Edmond Speelman =

Belgian ecclesiastical writer

Edmond Speelman (1819–1886) was a Belgian ecclesiastical writer.

== Life ==
Speelman was born in Ghent on 10 September 1819. He was educated at the Jesuit college in Aalst and in 1836 joined the Society of Jesus himself. He taught rhetoric at Jesuit schools in Drongen, Tournai and Namur, and then Church history in Leuven. In 1859 he left the Society but continued in the priesthood and as a teacher in Catholic schools. As a writer, he produced Church history and college drama. He retired in 1880, and died in Lede on 9 February 1886.

== Writings ==
Speelman was a regular contributor to the Revue catholique and Précis historiques.

His other writings include:

- Cornelius Smet, Belgique catholique: Saints et grands hommes du catholicisme en Belgique, translated by Edmond Speelman (3 vols., Leuven, 1852-1853; reprinted Tournai 1858, 1868 and 1877).
- La Vierge immaculée, patronne de la Belgique (Tournai, Casterman, 1856)
- Trois drames historiques. I. Le faux baron de Rochemaure. II. Ogier le Danois. III. Edwin (Tournai, Casterman, 1857)
- Belgium Marianum: Histoire du culte de Marie en Belgique (Tournai, Casterman, 1859)
- Deux drames du temps des gueux: Jacques Blommaert, ou le triomphe des gueux à Audenarde. Jean de Hembise, ou la chute des gueux à Gand (Ghent, S. Leliaert, A. Siffer et Cie., 1888).
