= Léon Du Bois =

Belgian organist, composer and conductor

Charles-Louis-Léon Du Bois (10 Jan 1859 - 19 November 1935) was a Belgian organist, composer, and conductor.

== Life and career ==
Born in Brussels, Du Bois was educated at the Royal Conservatory in his native city. In 1885 he won the Prix de Rome for his cantata Au bois des elfes. He worked as an opera conductor at several theaters; including posts at the Théâtre Graslin, Nantes in 1889–1890; Opéra Royal de Wallonie in Liège in 1891–1892; and La Monnaie from 1890 through 1897.

In 1912 Du Bois was elected as a member of the Royal Academy of Science, Letters and Fine Arts of Belgium. That same year he succeeded composer Edgar Tinel as director of the Royal Conservatory of Brussels; a post he remained in until 1925 when he was succeeded by Joseph Jongen.

As a composer, Du Bois was heavily influenced by Richard Wagner and followed in his aesthetic approach to music composition. His most well known work is the mimed drama Le mort (1894). His other compositions include the operas Son excellence ma femme (1884) and La revanche de Sganarelle (1886), two ballets, thirteen art songs, an oratorio, two marches, and several orchestral and choral works.

Du Bois died in Brussels on November 19, 1935 at the age of 76.

== Honours ==
- 1931: Grand Officer in the Order of Leopold.
