= Order of Leopold (Belgium) =

Belgian national honorary order of knighthood

Order of Leopold Ordre de Léopold Leopoldsorde
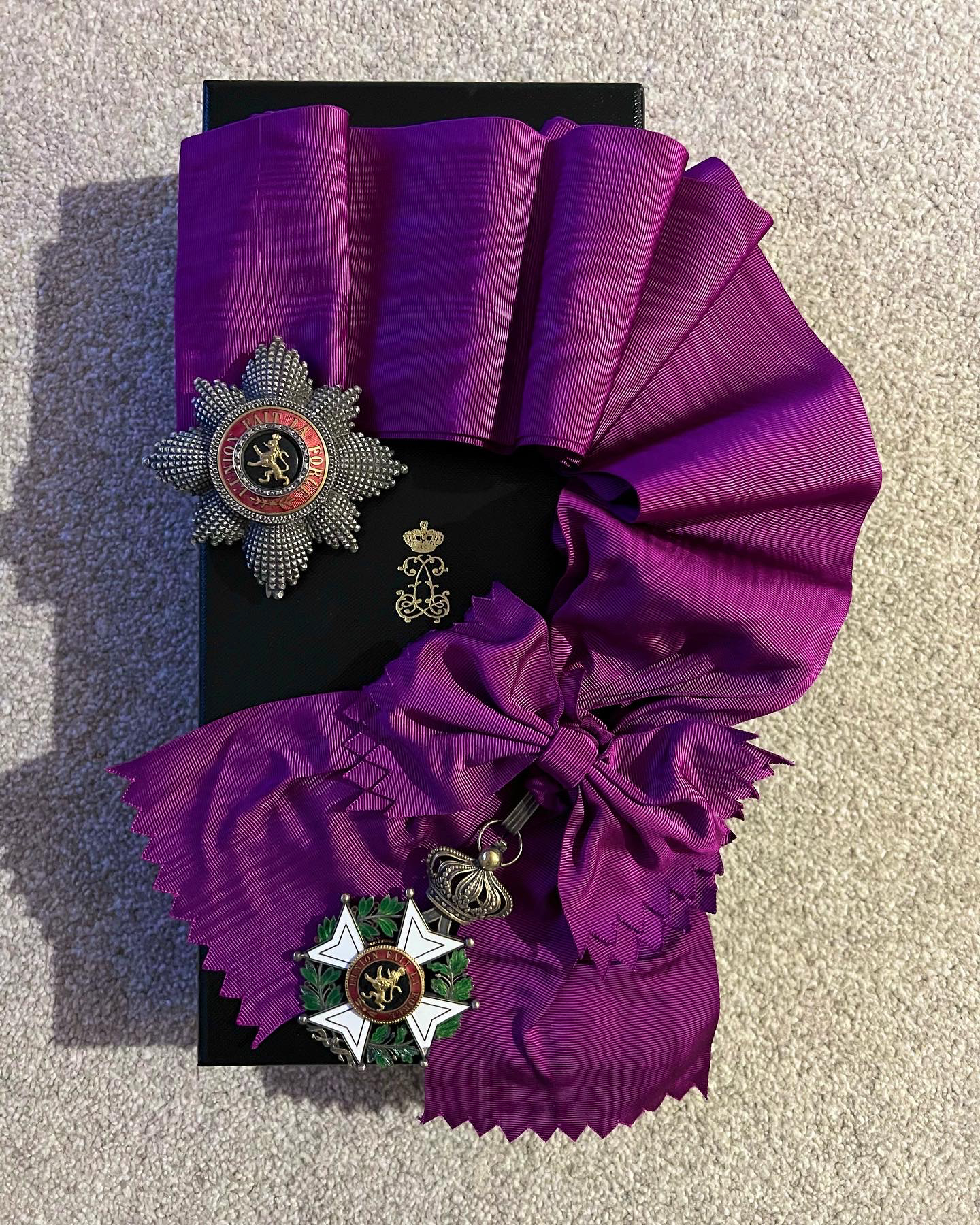
- Order of Leopold (Civil Grand Cordon set of insignia)

Awarded by (Belgium) King of the Belgians
- Type: Order of Merit with five degrees
- Established: 11 July 1832
- Motto: L'UNION FAIT LA FORCE - EENDRACHT MAAKT MACHT; EINIGKEIT MACHT STARK (Union makes strength) (Unity Makes Strength)
- Eligibility: Belgian and foreign citizens
- Awarded for: meritorious service to the Belgian state or society
- Status: Active
- Grand Master: His Majesty King Philippe
- Grades: Grand Cordon; Grand Officer (since 1838); Commander; Officer; Knight (OL)

Statistics
- First induction: French Sapper Valentin Ausseil

Precedence
- Next (higher): None (highest)
- Next (lower): Order of the African Star
- Ribbon (knight)

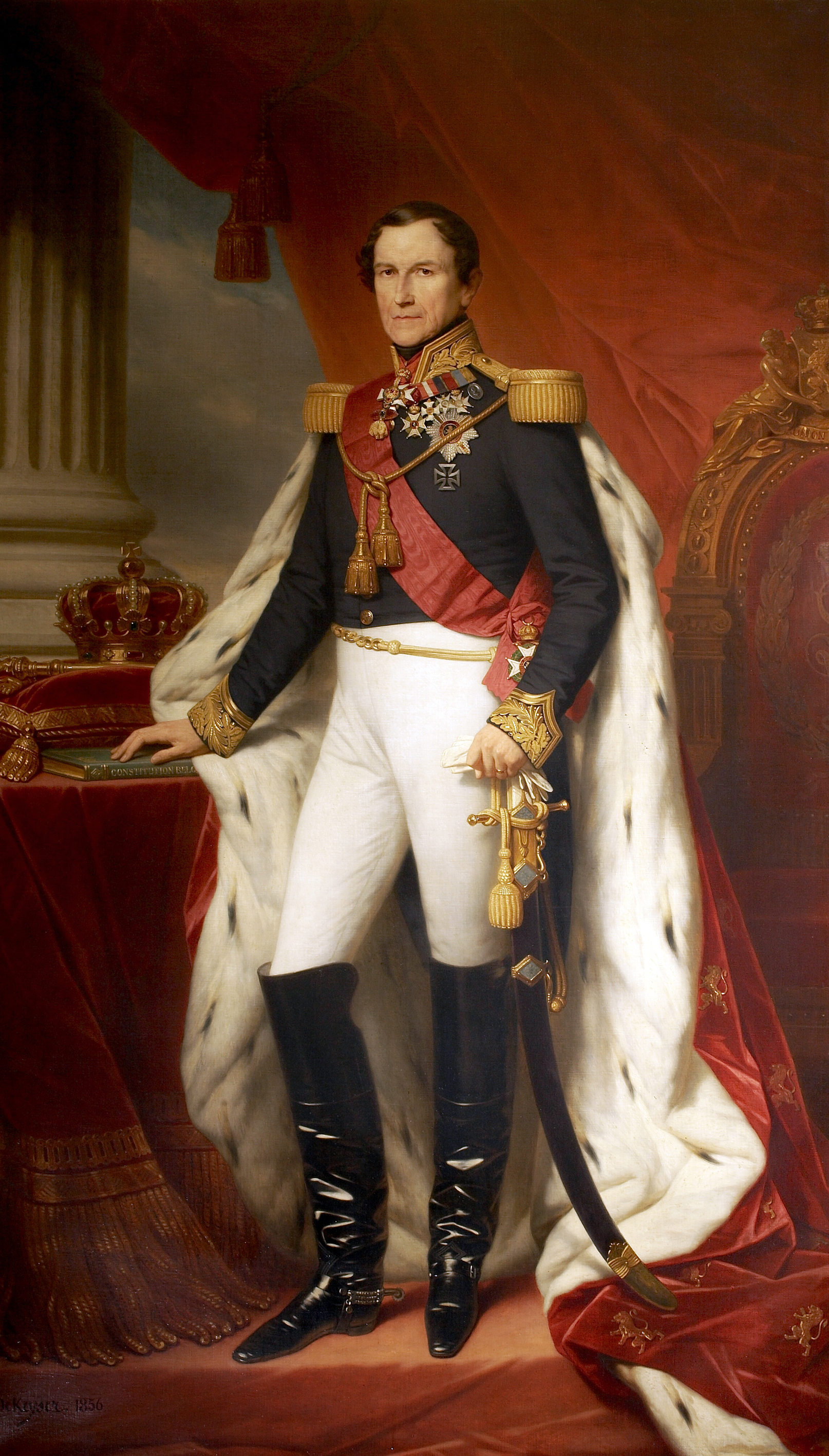
Leopold I, first King of the Belgians, Founder and First Grand Master of the Order.

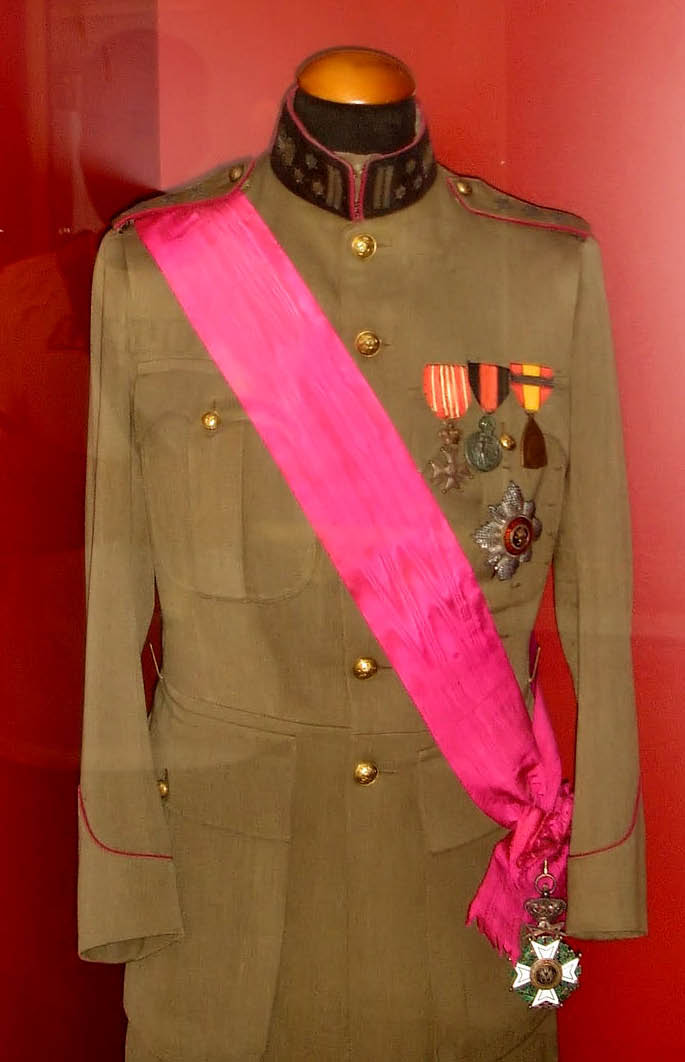
Uniform of HM Albert I, Royal Collection of Belgium

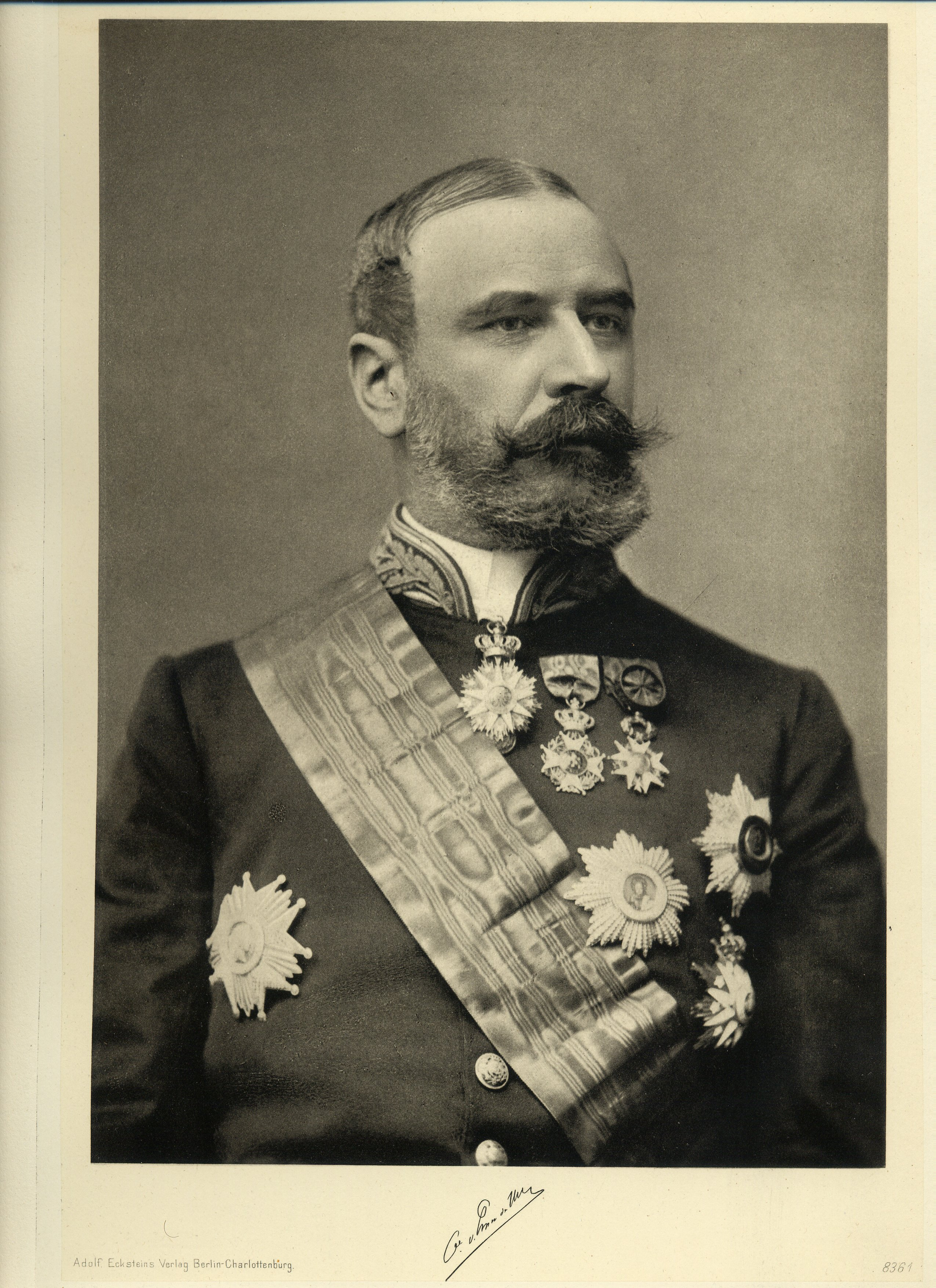
Count Paul de Smet de Naeyer, Grand Cordon

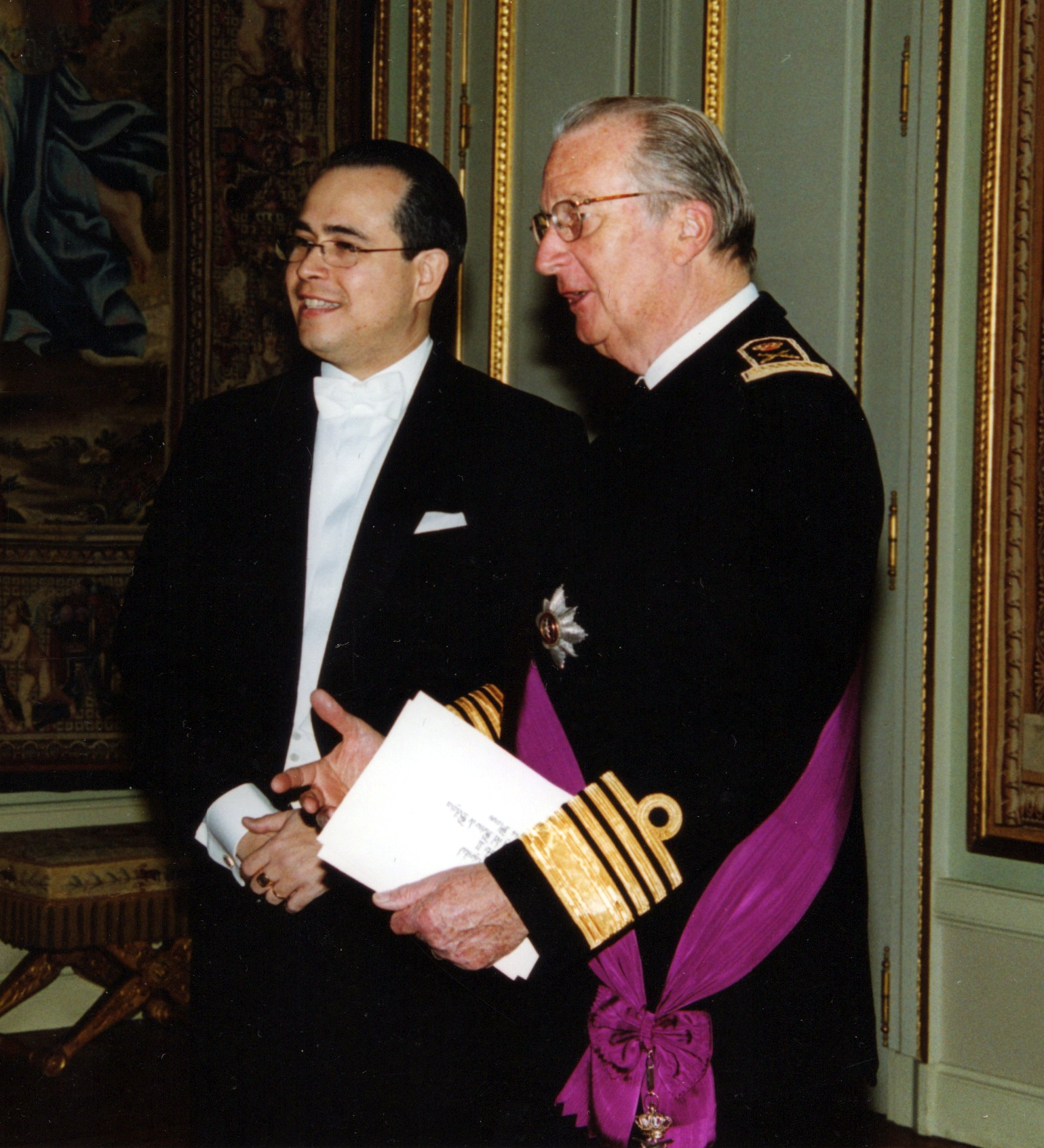
King Albert II (on the right) in 2005, with the Dominican Ambassador to Brussels

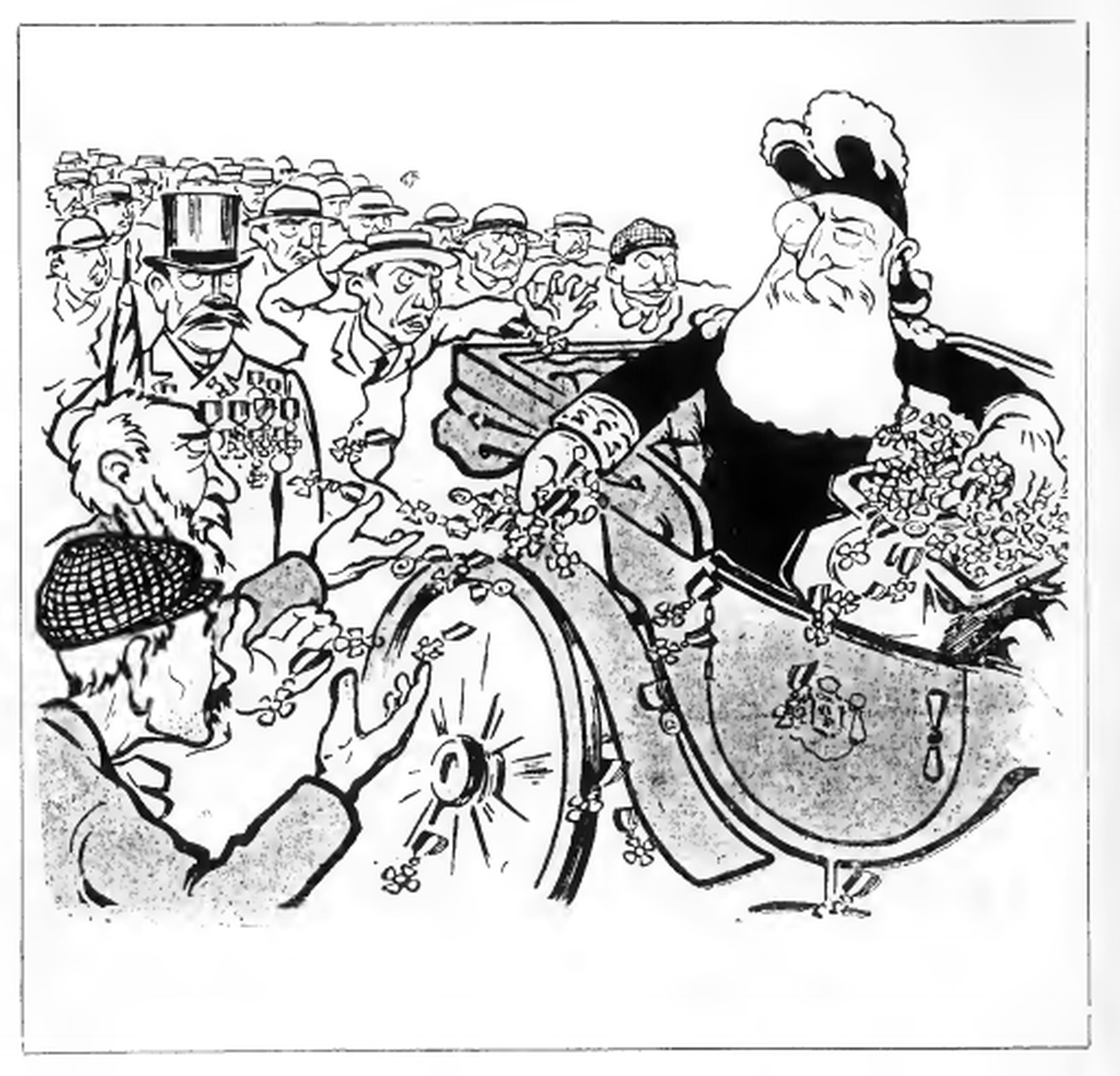
Cartoon depicting king Leopold II of the Belgians who is throwing medals to crowd

The Order of Leopold (Dutch: Leopoldsorde, French: Ordre de Léopold, German: Leopoldsorden) is one of the three current Belgian national honorary orders of knighthood. It is the oldest and highest order of Belgium and is named in honour of its founder, King Leopold I. It consists of a military, a maritime and a civil division. The maritime division is only awarded to personnel of the merchant navy, and the military division to military personnel. The decoration was established on 11 July 1832 and is awarded by Royal decree.

== History ==
When Belgium became independent of the Netherlands, there was an urgent need to create a national honour system that could serve as a diplomatic gift. The national congress provided this exclusive right to the sovereign, this military honour system was written in Article 76. The first King of the Belgians, Leopold I of Belgium, used his constitutional right in a larger way than foreseen: not only military merit, but every service in honour of the Kingdom. Two years after the independence, the young King officially founded the dynastic Order of Leopold. The king approved the colour and grades both civil and military, and the official motto L'Union fait la Force/Eendracht maakt Macht. In 1832 Felix de Merode had a design approved by the Chambers for military and civil merit. This system was adapted from other European countries. More specific, the Order of Leopold is based on the French honour tradition with 5 classes. On the 11th of June 1832 the law was promulgated, and the exact colours were defined; Article 2: "Le ruban sera ponceau moiré". The devise was presented in the 3rd article: L'union fait la Force.

=== Wedding gifts ===
Wedding Gifts, Order of Leopold.	1832	1853	1857	1867	1881	1900
Grand Cordons	1	9	3	10	20	15
Grand Officers	/	1	4	4	7	6
Commanders	5	3	7	10	19	10
Officers	6	3	6	8	19	3
Knights	4	3	2	6	30	20
Total	16	19	22	38	95	54

The Belgian court often used the Grand Cordon as a valuable diplomatic gift. However, in the 2nd half of the 19th century, the court also used it as a dynastic order to bestow on family members during major family celebrations. The founder gave his French family Grand Cordons as wedding gifts. During weddings the Belgian court sent large numbers of crosses to the new family and its court. For the wedding of Rudolf and Stephanie the father of the bride sent 20 Grand Cordons to the Austrian Court. In return the Belgian court received decorations; these gifts were part of negotiations of the wedding. The order was bestowed by King Leopold II on Prince Karl Anton of Hohenzollern and Ernst Gunther, Duke of Schleswig-Holstein as a personal marriage gift. In 1878 the King named several diplomatic dignitaries Grand Cordon in honour of his silver wedding celebration, among them Vannutelli.

In 1900 the occasion of the wedding of Prince Albert was used to send 15 Grand Cordons to the Bavarian Court. Among the recipients were Luitpold, Prince Regent of Bavaria and his two sons, Princes Ludwig (the future Ludwig III of Bavaria) and Arnulf, Duke Louis of Bavaria and the father of the bride Karl Theodor, Duke in Bavaria.

The brother of the new Princess, Duke Ludwig Wilhelm was still a minor at the time of the wedding, and Minister de Favereau opposed this wedding gift for an adolescent. However, the young prince, aged 14, received the gift by royal decree.

=== Others ===
People who fought in the Belgian revolution became members in great numbers. In 1836 Giacomo Meyerbeer was made a knight of the Order by royal command, as a "particular mark of esteem" for someone who had distinguished themselves in the arts. In 1838 the King lost his right to create members, which was from then on the responsibility of the foreign office. By the end of Leopold's reign the major political elite were members of the order.

King Leopold II bestowed the order upon notable Belgian artists, generals and clergy. His successors continued to bestow the Order; among the thousands of recipients are some famous people like Porfirio Díaz, Pope Leo XIII, Mohamed Ennaceur, Pierre-Jean De Smet, Eugène Scribe, Alfred Belpaire, Victor Horta, Joseph Geefs, Gustave Van de Woestijne, Raymond Poincaré, Constant Permeke, Henry Morton Stanley, Lu Zhengxiang, Amschel Mayer Rothschild, Emile Claus, Fernand Khnopff, Paul Saintenoy, Joseph Jongen, Eugène Ysaÿe, Alfred Bastien, William-Adolphe Bouguereau, Antonio López de Santa Anna, Thomas Vinçotte, Mgr. Rafael Merry del Val, John Browning, James Blyth, 1st Baron Blyth, Brand Whitlock, Charles Lindbergh, George S. Patton, Bernard Montgomery, Dwight Eisenhower, Wesley Clark, Charles de Gaulle, Mstislav Rostropovich, Count Kiyoura Keigo, Count Jacques Rogge, Prince Fulco Ruffo di Calabria and Prince Emmanuel de Merode. At the end of World War I, the order became internationally recognised for its famous members.

In 1919 King Albert granted all Lieutenant-Generals of the Belgian Army the Grand Cordon in Brussels. The King bestowed the Major Generals with the Grand Cordon, amongst the recipients some important generals like baron Honoré Drubbel, Alphonse Jacques de Dixmude, knight Antonin de Selliers de Moranville and Baron Édouard Michel du Faing d'Aigremont. Foreign recipients include admiral Hugh Rodman and Vice Admiral William Sowden Sims One of the rare Ladies in the order was Countess Renée de Merode.

The order can be bestowed posthumously; for example, Emile Verhaeren received the Grand Cordon after his death. Recipients can be deprived of the order, as for example happened during World War I with Alfred Wotquenne.

After the Second World War, the Order of Leopold was bestowed on the several officers of foreign military forces who had helped to liberate Belgium from German occupation. Most illustrious was the grand Cordons with Palms given by the King to Sir Winston Churchill and Dwight D. Eisenhower in 1945. The medal was also granted to Karel Bossart in 1962, and Josip Broz Tito in 1970.

Today membership can only be granted by decree of His Majesty King Philippe of the Belgians and is reserved to the very most important Belgian nationals and to some distinguished foreign persons who contributed in one way to the Belgian military, the Belgian civil society or the Belgian State. Annually, there are two major days when the king normally grants membership, 15 April (King Philip's birthday) and 15 November (Day of the Belgian Dynasty).

During state visits, the Order of Leopold is the most important diplomatic gift of the state. In 2015 some protest was noted when King Philippe offered the Grand Cordon to President Erdoğan of Turkey during his state visit in Belgium. A parliamentary question was consequently submitted by Barbara Pas.

In 2022, Belgian Prime Minister Alexander De Croo presented honorary distinctions on behalf of the Belgian state at Belgium's Consulate General in New York. The Belgians honored were scientist and President of the Children's Tumor Foundation Annette Bakker (Officer of the Order of Leopold), businessman and former CEO of AB InBev Carlos Brito (Grand Officer of the Order of the Crown), banker Georges Ugeux (Commander of the Order of the Crown), psychiatrist Esther Perel (Knight of the Order of the Crown), and artist Marie-Paule Martin (Knight of the Order of Leopold).

== Classes ==
The Order of Leopold is issued in five classes:

- Grand Cordon ('Grand Cordon/Grootlint'), who wears the badge on a collar (chain) or on a sash on the right shoulder, plus the star on the left side of the chest;
- Grand Officer ('Grand Officier/Grootofficier'), who wears a badge on a necklace, plus a star on the left side of the chest (created on 31 December 1838);
- Commander ('Commandeur'), who wears the badge on a necklace;
- Officer ('Officier'), who wears the badge on a ribbon with rosette on the left side of the chest;
- Knight ('Chevalier/Ridder'), who wears the badge on a ribbon on the left side of the chest.

All five classes come in three divisions (civil, military, maritime). No membership can be granted to a person before the age of 42, except in the military division.

Only the Belgian king is entitled to chair the order and to be named Grand Master ('Grand Maître/Grootmeester').

=== Grand Cordon ===
The Grand Cordon title is reserved in general for other monarchs, heirs, foreign heads of state, generals, Cardinals, ministers of state, Prime Ministers and high diplomats. The Belgian Court has granted the Grand Cordon to all of its family members often considered a personal marriage gift of the king.

The court has sent grand cordons to other dignitaries like ambassadors, cardinals, important artists and high functionaries. As of the class of commander the decision must be approved by the Council of Ministers.

Following the tradition, it is not allowed that a Belgian minister can accept this gift from the King, during the period of public office.

== Insignia ==
The collar of the order is in gold, with nine crowns, nine face-to-face monograms "LR" (for "Leopoldus Rex" for King Leopold I), and eighteen lions.

The badge of the order is a white-enameled Maltese Cross, in silver for the Knight class and in gold for the higher classes, with a green-enameled wreath of laurel and oak leaves between the arms of the cross. The obverse central disc features a lion on a black enamel background; the reverse central disc has the face-to-face monogram "LR" (for King Leopold I); both discs are surrounded by a red enamel ring with the motto "Unity Is Strength" in French (L'union fait la force) and in Dutch (Eendracht maakt macht). The cross is topped by a crown, which might have crossed swords (military division) or anchors (maritime division) underneath it. The civil division has neither swords nor anchors.

The plaque of the order is an eight-pointed faceted silver star for the Grand Cordon class, and a silver faceted Maltese Cross with straight rays between the arms for the Grand Officer class. The central disc has a lion on a black enamel background, surrounded by a red enamel ring with the motto as on the badge. Golden crossed swords or anchors might be added behind the medallion, depending on division.

The ribbon of the order is usually plain purple. However, if the order is awarded in special circumstances, the ribbon of the Officer and Knight classes show the following variations:

- Crossed swords are added to the ribbon when awarded in wartime (if the order was awarded during the Second World War or during the Korean War, a small bar is added to the ribbon mentioning the name of the war);
- The ribbon has a vertical gold border on both sides when awarded for a special act of valour at war;
- The ribbon has a central vertical gold stripe when awarded for an exceptionally meritorious act in wartime;
- A silver star is added to the ribbon when awarded for meritorious acts of charity;
- A gold star is added to the ribbon when the recipient has been mentioned in dispatches at the national level;
- Silver or gold palms are added to the ribbon when awarded in wartime to military personnel.

Stars and borders or stripes can be awarded together, but these deviations are currently only rarely awarded. The colour of the ribbon has varied during the nineteenth century from red to purple.

The ribbon bar of the order, which is worn on the semi-formal dress uniform is:

Ribbon bars
Grand Cordon	Grand Officer	Commander	Officer	Knight

Since 1921, insignias of the order not awarded in wartime have to be purchased by the recipient.

== Award conditions ==
=== Current award conditions of Belgian national orders ===
National orders are awarded by royal decree at fixed dates: 8 April (Birthday of King Albert I), 15 November (King's Feast), and in some cases on 21 July (Belgian national holiday) to reward meritorious services to the Kingdom of Belgium based on the career path and age of the recipient. A number of different regulations rule the award of national order for the various ministries. In addition, the national orders may be awarded by the king for especially meritorious deeds. The royal decrees, except for conferrals on foreigners, are published in the Belgian Official Journal (Belgisch Staatsblad/Moniteur Belge).

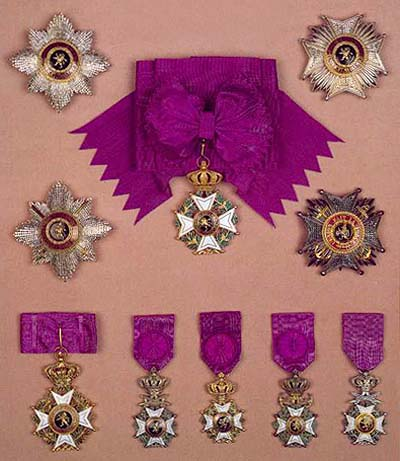
1/ Grand Cordon Star - civil and military divisions (left), Grand Cordon sash (middle), Grand Officer plaques - civil and maritime divisions (right). Bottom part: Commander's Cross (civil division), officer's cross (military division), officer's cross (civil division), officer's cross (maritime division), knight's cross (military division) (courtesy Société de l'Ordre de Léopold)

The minister responsible for Foreign Affairs, currently the Federal Public Service (SPF/FOD) Foreign Affairs, administers the national orders and has a role of advisor in cases not fitting within a regulation.

For the award of national orders for persons to which no regulation apply or has been adopted, the number of awards is limited every year by decision of the Council of Ministers (contingent).

The classes of the national orders are integrated in a combined hierarchy defined by law, whereby within one class the Order of Leopold is senior to the Order of the Crown, which is senior to the Order of Leopold II. One cannot be awarded a National Order at a level below the highest that the recipient has already received.

Persons who are the subject of criminal proceedings will usually not be awarded a national order until they are declared not guilty.

=== Award of the Order of Leopold in the Military Division ===
The Order of Leopold in the Military Division (with crossed swords under the crown) is mostly awarded to military personnel on the basis of their length of service, although exceptions to that rule exist where the order is presented to military personnel for exceptional or meritorious service. (e.g. awards to officers or non-commissioned officers for devoted service to His Majesy the King).

- Grand Officer: Awarded to a Lieutenant-General after holding that rank for about 2 years, for exceptional services to the Armed Forces;
- Commander: Awarded after 35 years of meritorious service to a general officer;
- Officer: Awarded after 28 years of meritorious service to a field officer;
- Knight: Awarded after 20 years of meritorious service to a commissioned officer with minimum rank of Captain, and after 40 years of meritorious service for a non-commissioned officer.

The years of service that are counted to calculate the eligibility of the award are not necessarily equal to the (calendar) years of duty. Additional bonuses can be earned for service in the air (a heritage coming from King Albert who want to bestow extra credit upon the pilots in the first World War, who often faced great danger in a new and experimental military branch) or on the battlefield (during wartime) and years of service as a non-commissioned officer or as enlisted personnel count as half for the awards made to officers. For awards to military personnel, there is no minimum age requirement.

=== Award of the Order of Leopold in the Maritime Division ===
The order in the Maritime Division (with crossed anchors under the crown) is only awarded to members of the merchant navy, as members of the Belgian Navy are awarded the order in the Military Division. The Order of Leopold is currently almost never awarded in the Maritime Division.

=== Award conditions for long civilian service ===
The Knight's Cross of the Order of Leopold may be awarded to workers in the private sector or contractual employees of the public sector after fifty-five years of professional activity.

The Knight's Cross of the Order of Leopold is also awarded to the members of the national and provincial committees for the promotion of labour who have reached the age of 42 after a tenure of 20 years (national committee) or 30 years (provincial committee).

== The Association of the Order of Leopold ==
Founded in 1932 on the occasion of the centenary of the creation of the Order of Leopold as "Société d'entraide des membres de l'Ordre de Léopold" / "Vereniging tot onderlinge hulp aan de leden van de Leopoldsorde" (Mutual aid society for the members of the Order of Leopold), the Association of the Order of Leopold (Vereniging van de Leopoldsorde in Dutch, Société de l'Ordre de Léopold in French) is a private association, that is headquartered in Brussels.

== Equivalent orders ==
Even though orders from different states are not always easy to compare, the Order of Leopold is modeled like the French honour system. The Legion of Honour, which is the highest French order, has the same classes and award conditions. German orders have often different older honour systems, often with only 3 classes or less. The Order of Leopold is roughly equivalent to the following orders from other States.

- The Danish Order of Dannebrog, the Order of the Elephant being awarded almost exclusively to Heads of State and royalty.
- The French Légion d'Honneur, which is the highest French order and has similar classes and award conditions.
- The British Order of the Bath, which is the highest British order awarded to more than a very limited number of people.
- The Jordanian Order of Al-Hussein bin Ali, the highest order of the Hashemite Kingdom of Jordan with the scope of rewarding benevolence and foreign Heads of State.
- The Luxembourg Order of the Gold Lion of the House of Nassau, which is the highest Luxembourgian order and has similar classes but is only rarely awarded, and the Luxembourg Order of Adolphe of Nassau.
- The Dutch Military William Order, which is the highest Dutch order but rarely awarded, could be considered the equivalent of the Military Division of the Order of Leopold awarded for bravery. The Order of the Netherlands Lion would be equivalent of the Order of Leopold in other cases.
- The Norwegian Order of St. Olav, which is currently the highest Norwegian order and has similar classes.
- The Swedish Order of the Polar Star, which is the highest Swedish order awarded more widely than to Heads of State and has similar classes, the Royal Order of the Seraphim being only awarded to Heads of State.

== Gallery ==
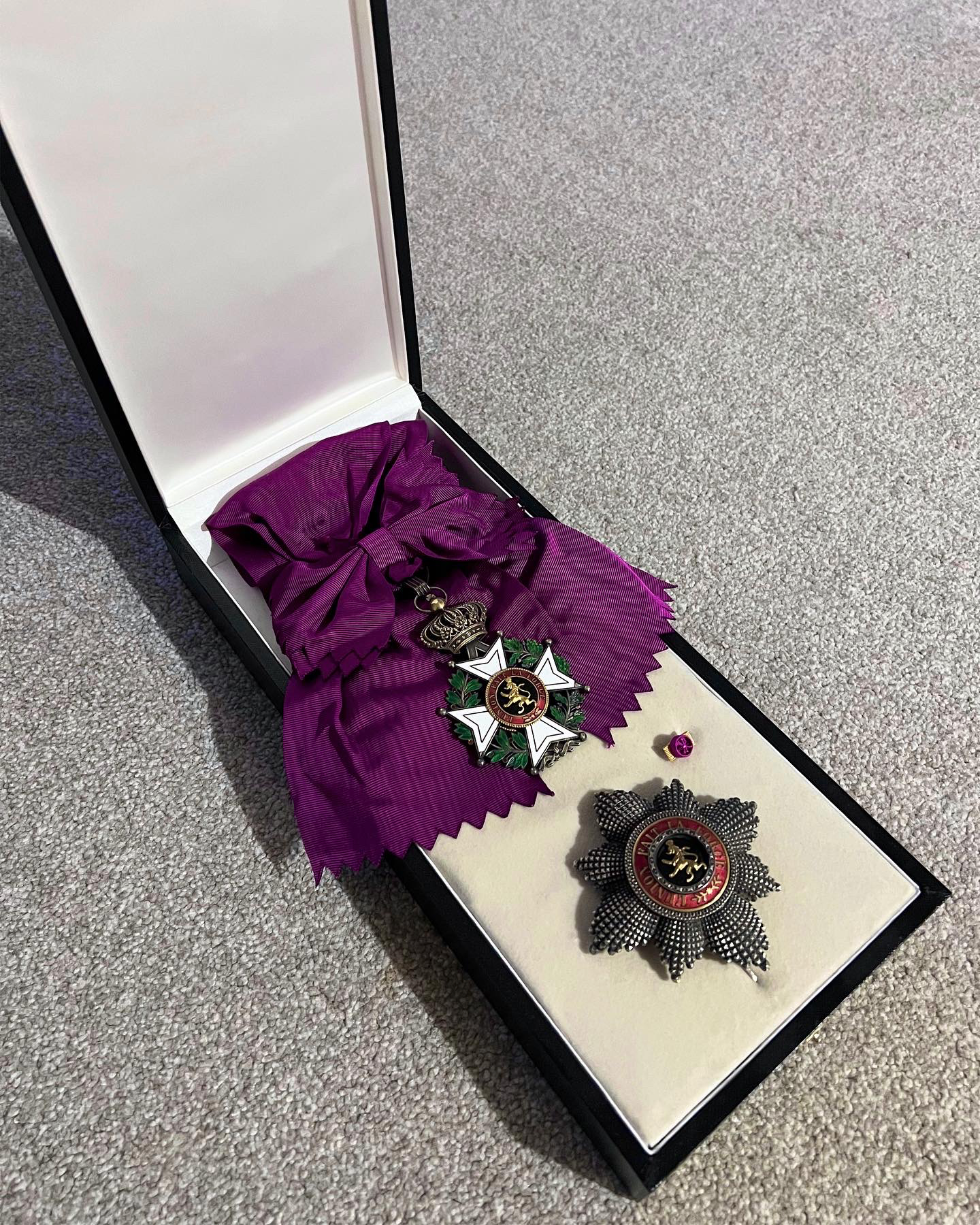
Order of Leopold Grand Cordon in case, from the reign of Albert I.

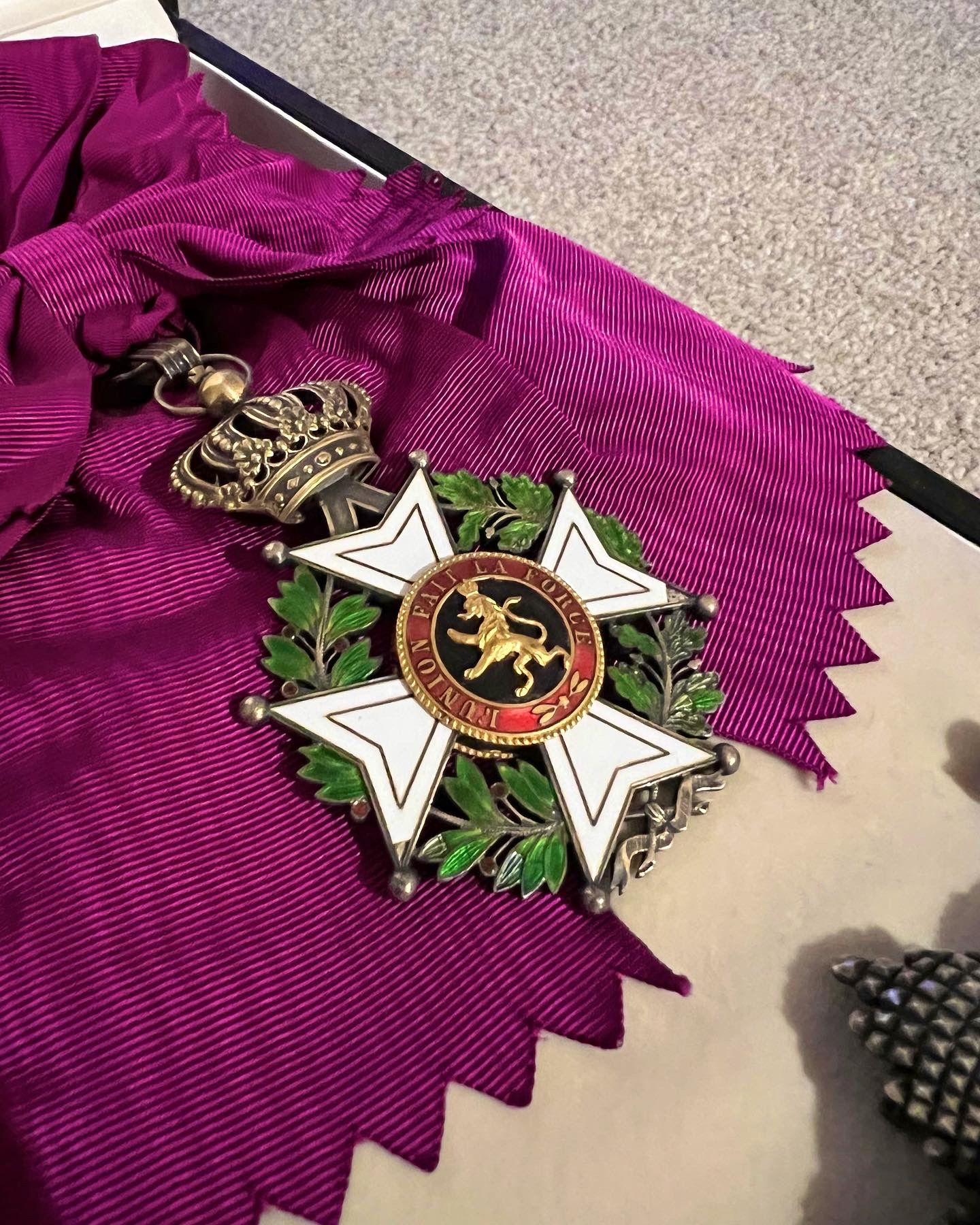
Grand Cordon badge (obverse).

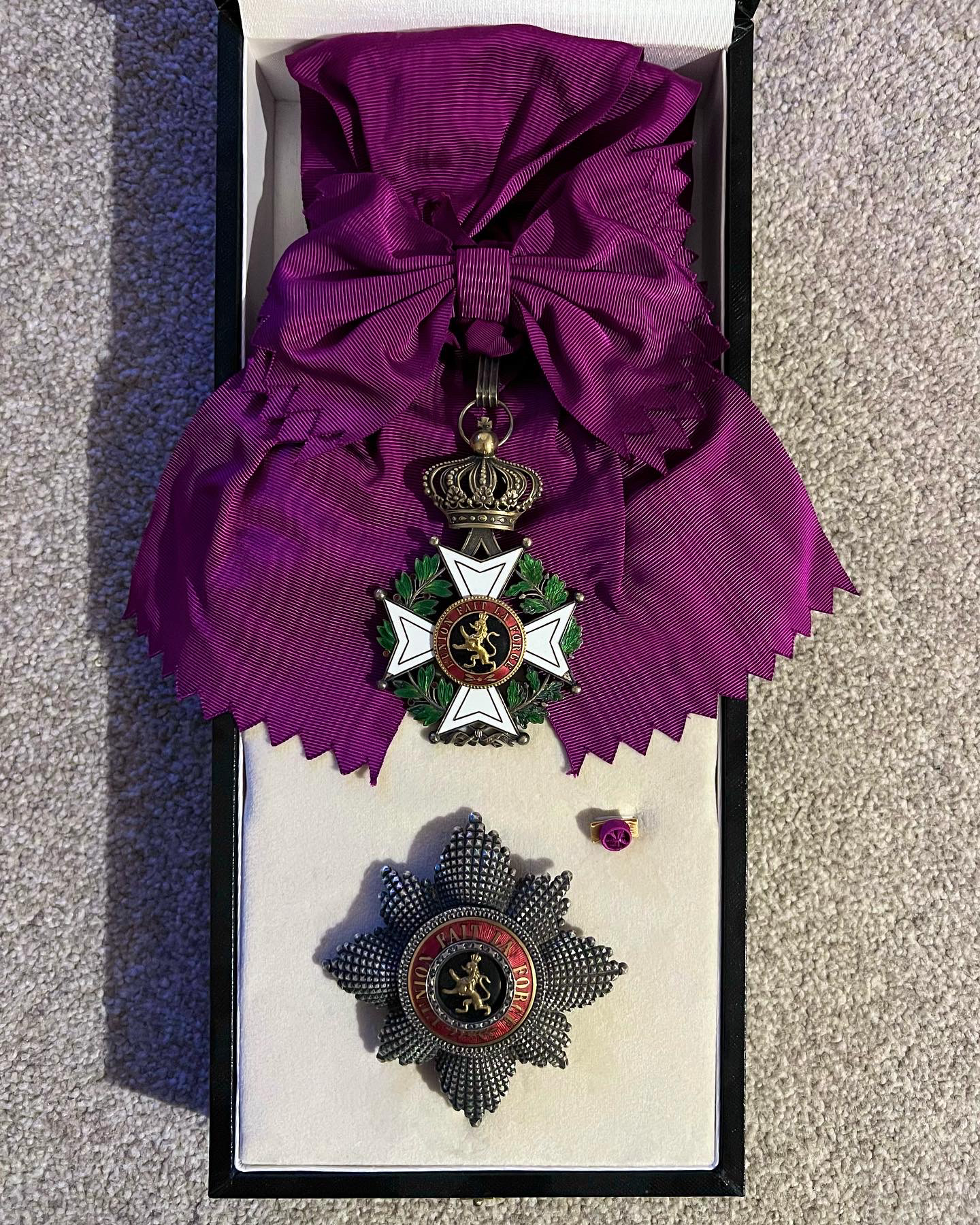
Grand Cordon set of insignia.

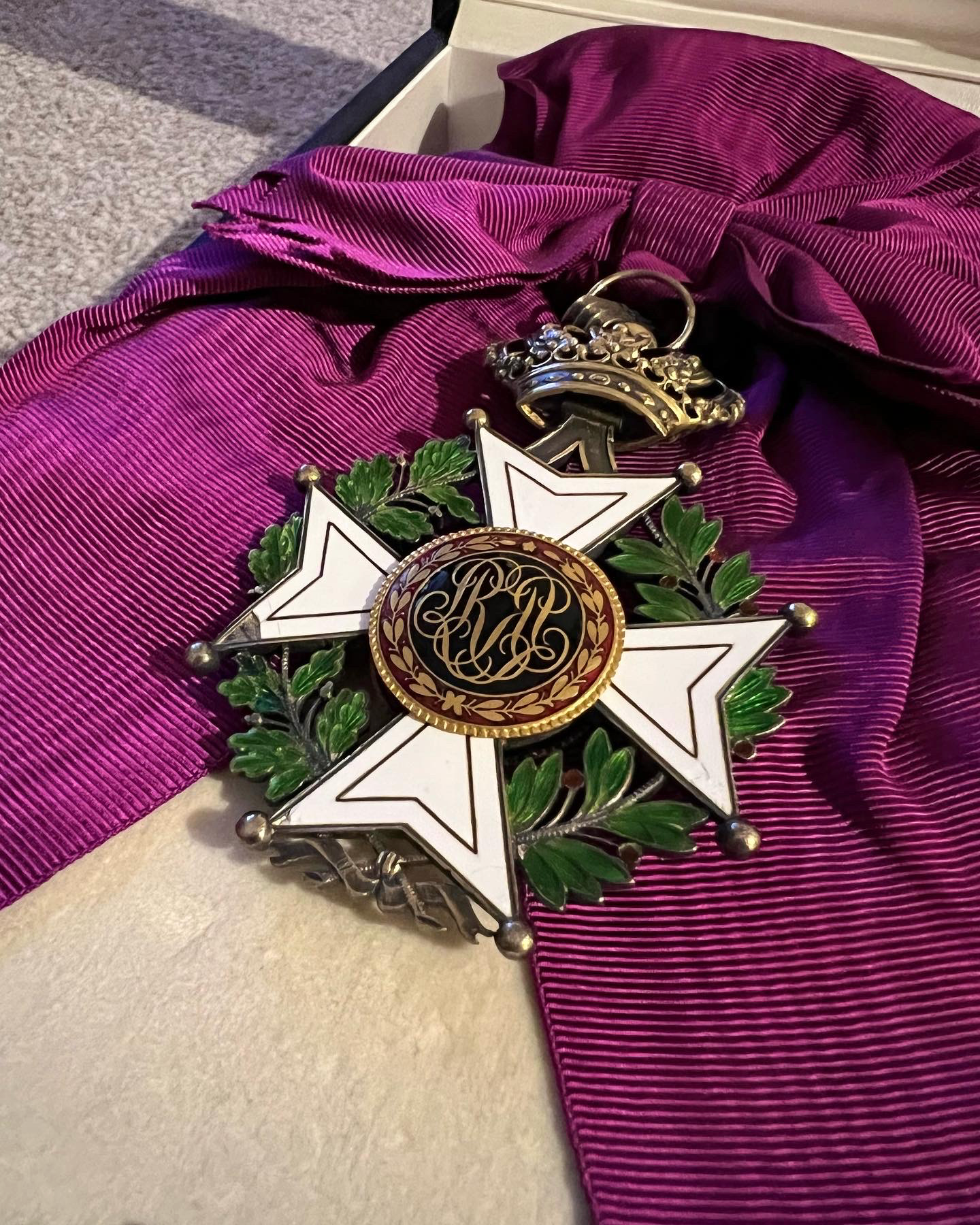
Grand Cordon badge (reverse).

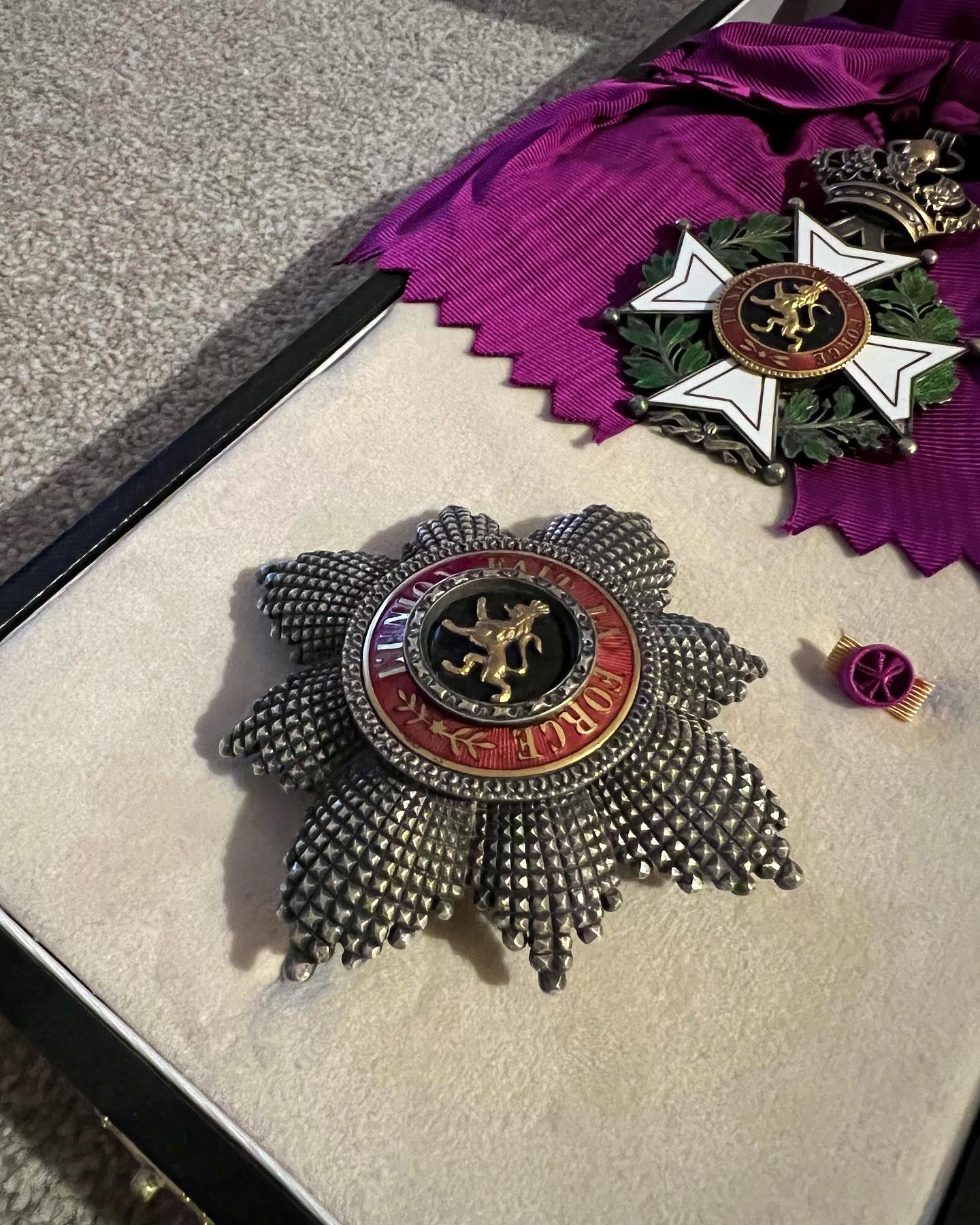
Grand Cordon breast star.

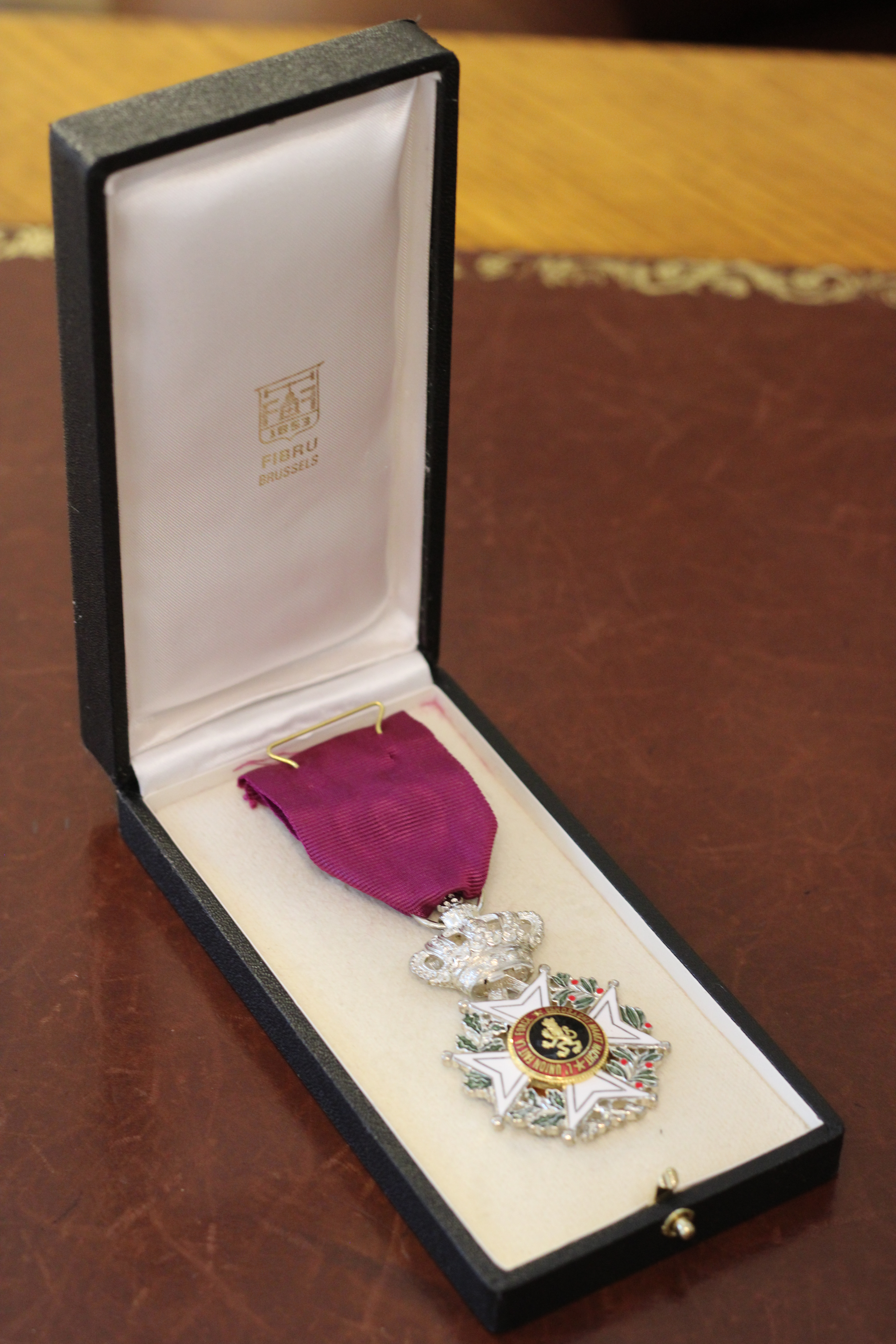
Knights class (Chevalier).

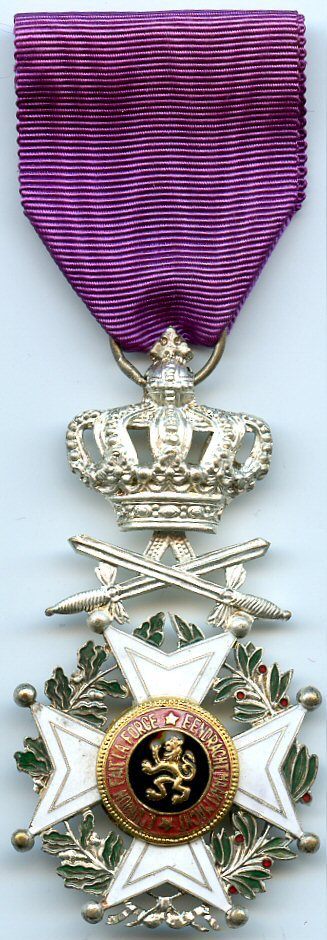
Knights class with swords (Chevalier Militaire).

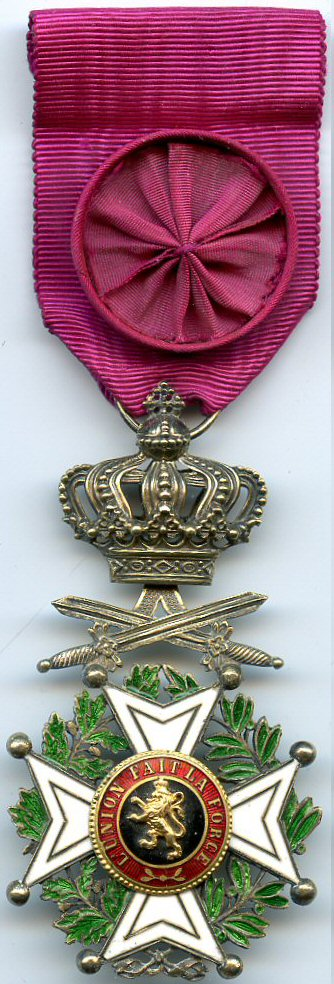
Officer class with swords (Officier Militaire).

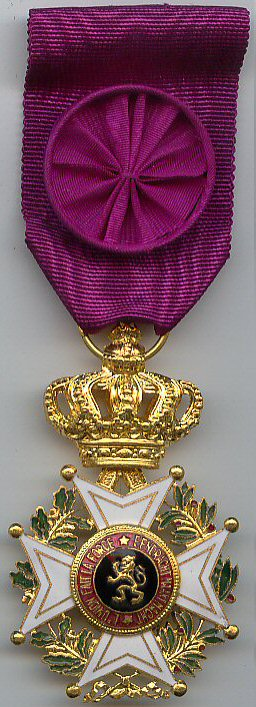
Officer class (Officier).

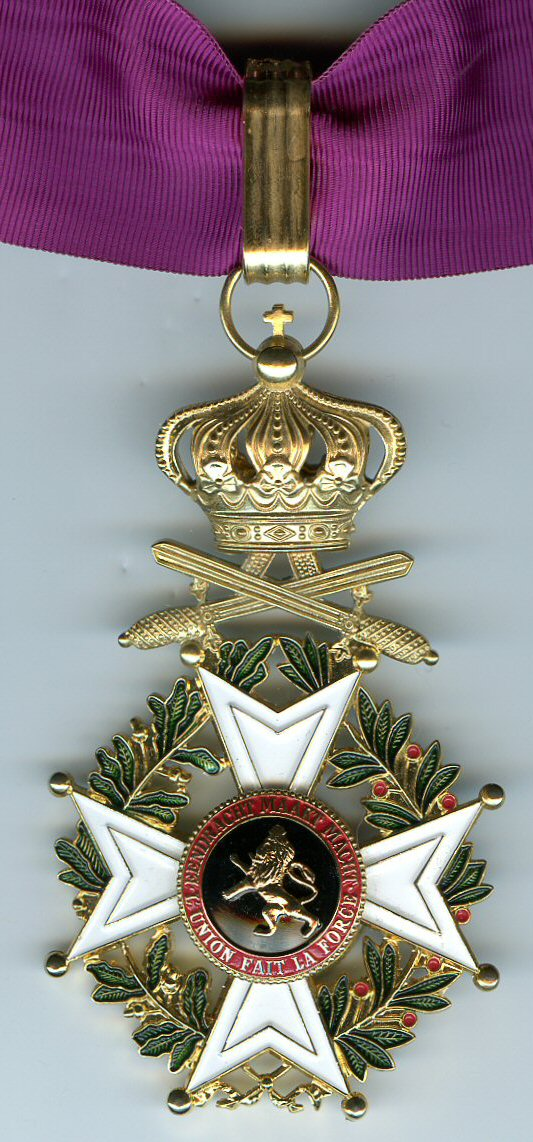
Commander class with swords (Commandeur Militaire).

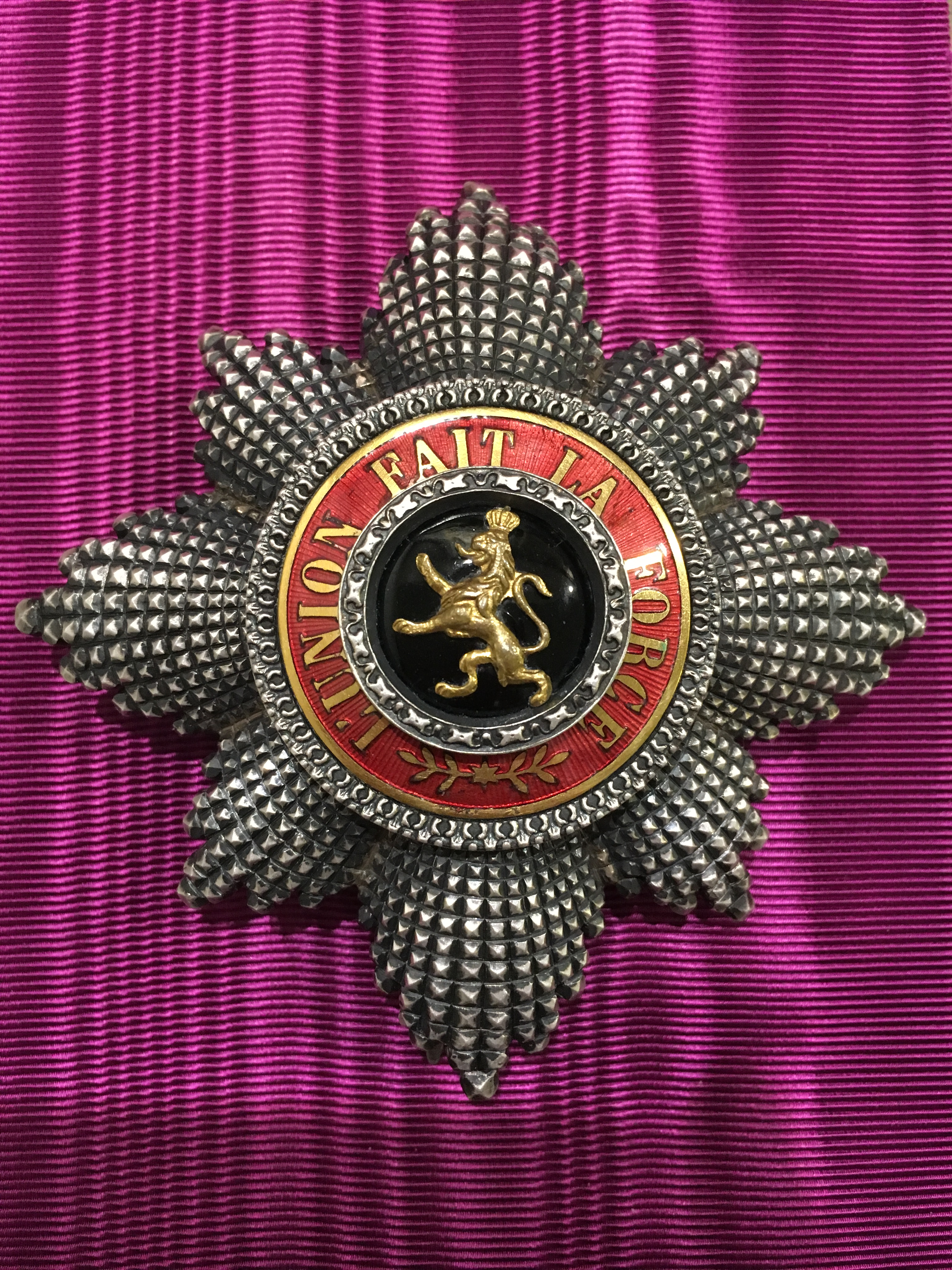
Grand Cordon breast star from the reign of Albert I.

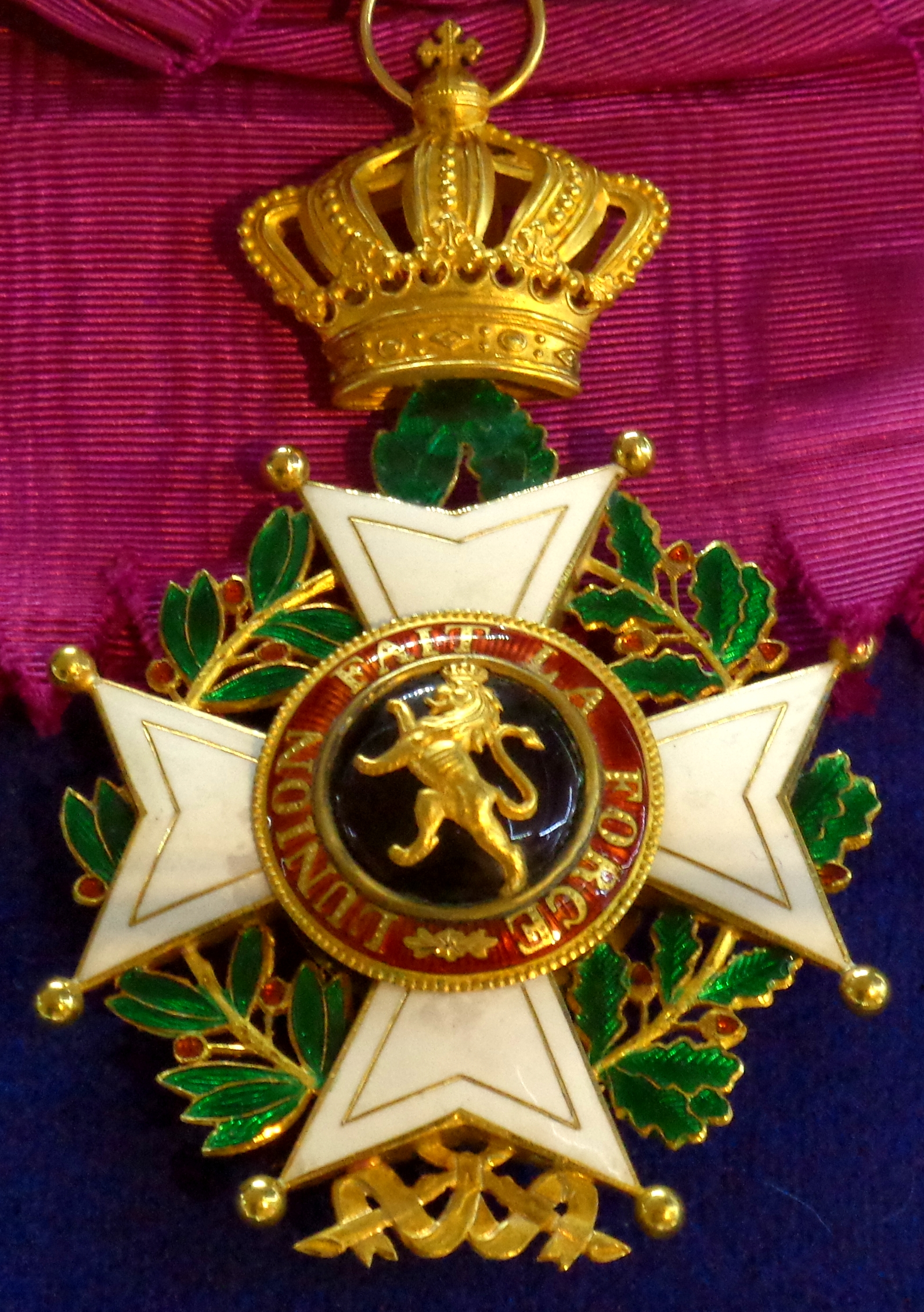
Grand Cordon badge in gold, 1930.

Collar of the Order, heraldic depiction.

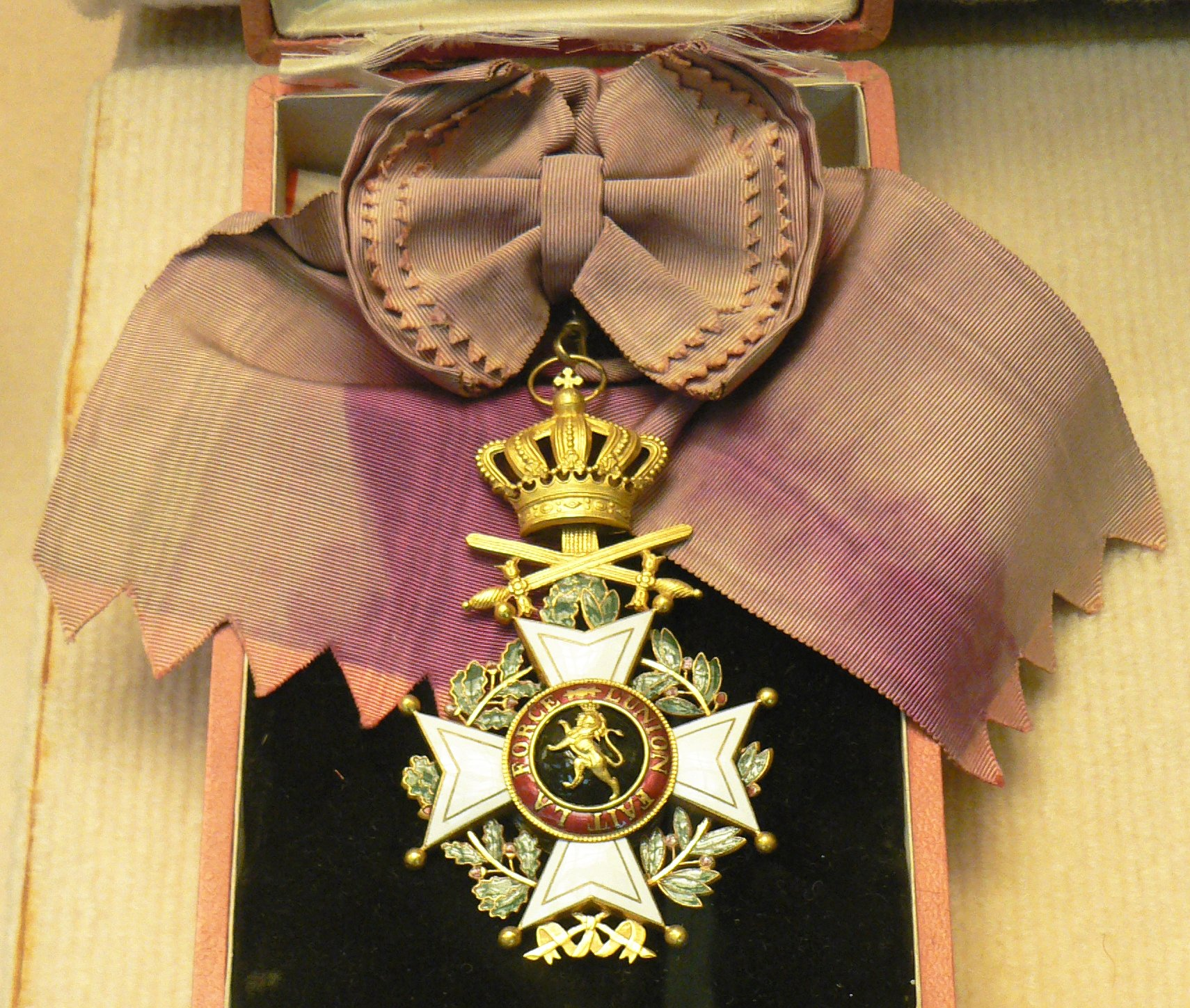
Grand Cordon sash and badge, with swords.

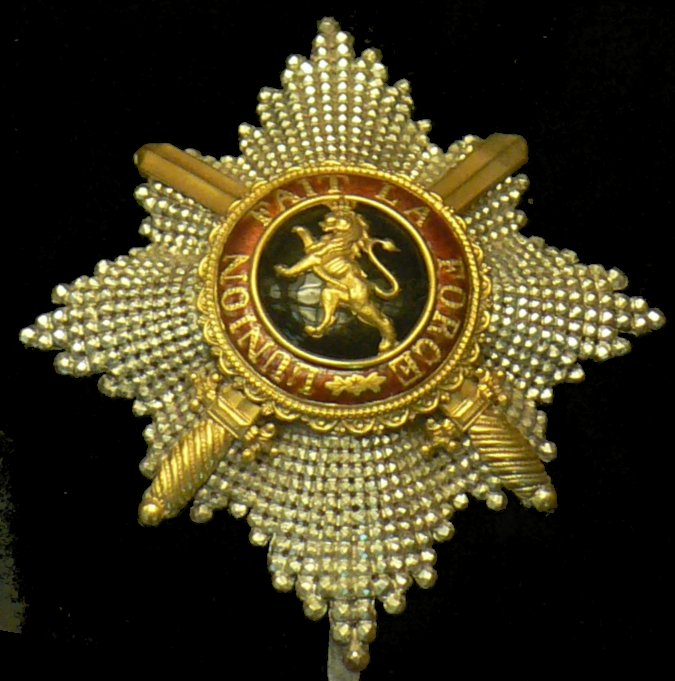
Grand Cordon breast star, with swords.

== See also ==
- Grand Masters: Leopold I - Leopold II - Albert I - Leopold III - Baudouin - Albert II - Philippe
- List of grand cordons of the Order of Leopold
- Orders, decorations, and medals of Belgium
- Order of the African Star
- Order of the Crown
- Order of Leopold II
- Royal Order of the Lion
