= Paul de Smeth =

Belgian philatelist

Paul de Smeth (7 November 1859 – 10 December 1940) was a Belgian philatelist who signed the Roll of Distinguished Philatelists in 1926.
