= Celebration of Life Monument =

Monument in Salt Lake City, Utah, U.S.

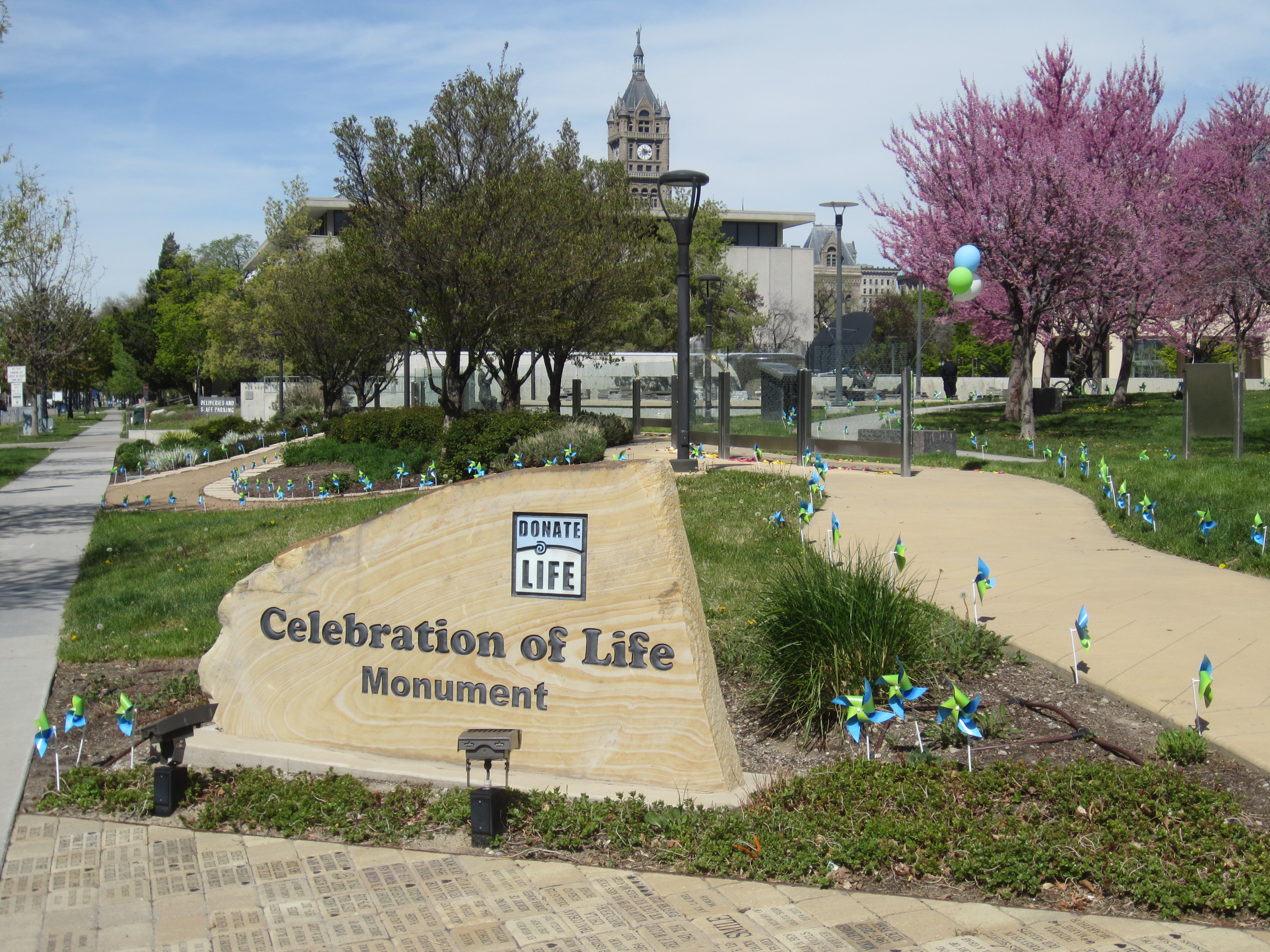
- Location: Salt Lake City, Utah, United States
- Coordinates: 40°45′31.51″N 111°53′0.61″W

The Celebration of Life Monument is a visual art display in Salt Lake City, Utah, United States. The monument commemorates organ donors, and is located southeast of the Salt Lake City Public Library.

== History ==
The memorial was vandalized in May 2020 during a civil unrest incident in the area.

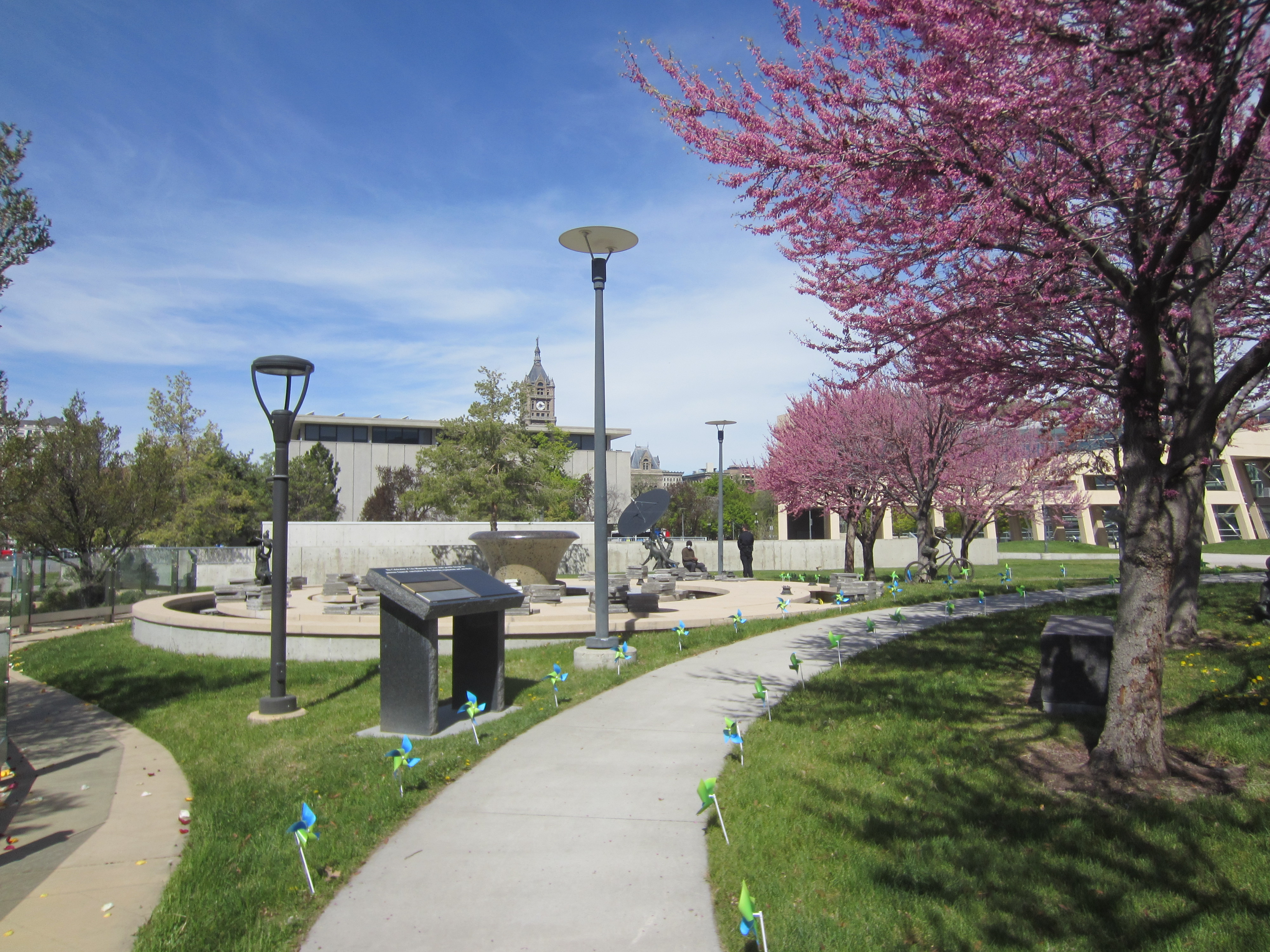

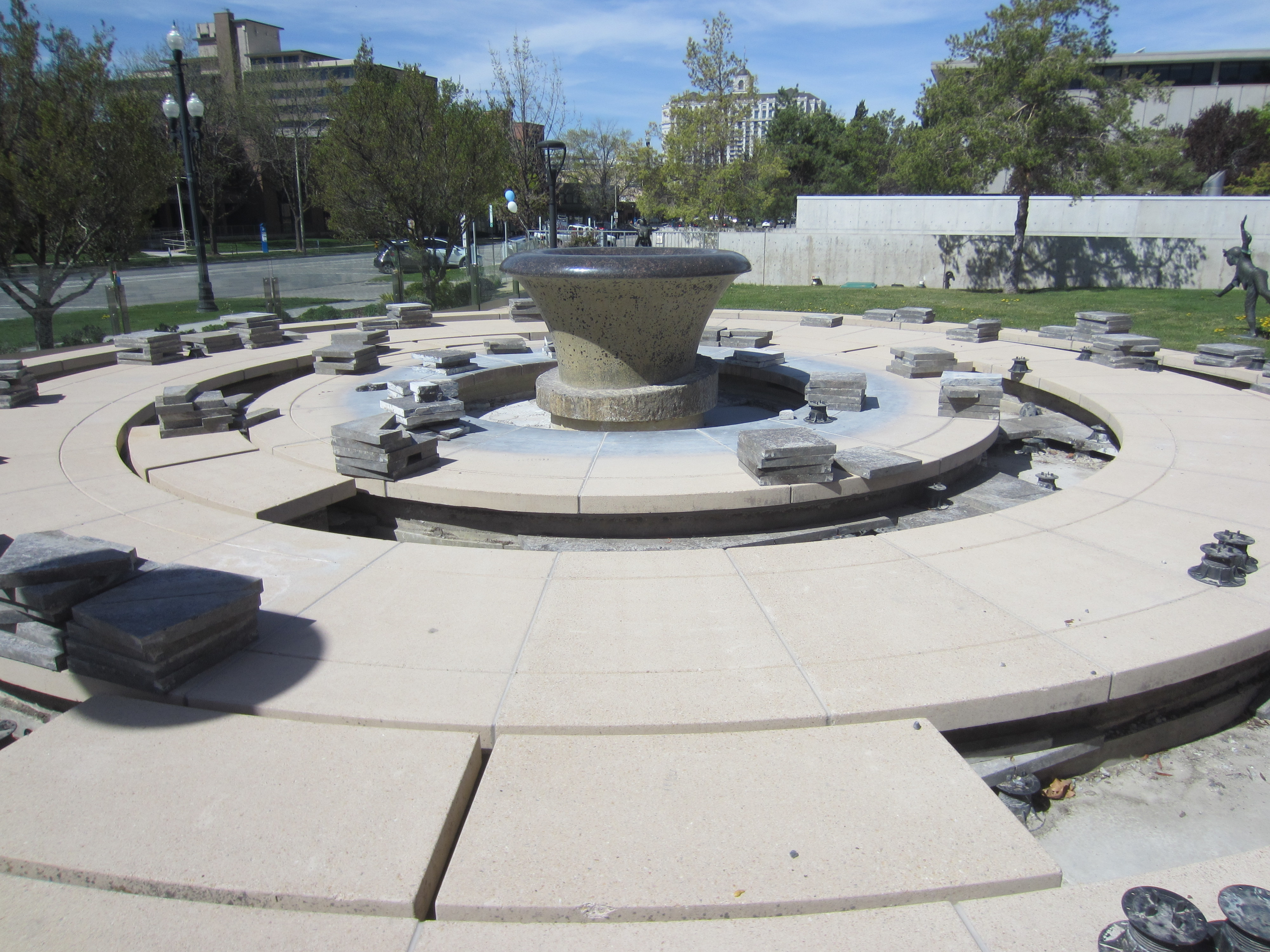
