= Marilyn Wood =

American choreographer and writer (1929–2016)

- Born: 1929; Columbus, Ohio, U.S.
- Died: June 16, 2016
- Movement: Modern dance
- Spouse: Robert Wood

Marilyn Wood (1929-2016) was an American choreographer, intermedia artist, and dancer. She created contemporary, and city-scale intermedia performances known as "Celebrations". Marilyn Wood's Celebration Events are recognized for bringing communities together to celebrate their vitality and diversity. They are a unique experience of spectacle and participation in urban environments. Her work is recognized as helping to reinvent the spirit and drama of the ancient festival in contemporary life.

== Early years ==
Wood was born in Columbus, Ohio in 1929. Her father's career took the family to Puerto Rico, where she spent her childhood years taking drawing classes, performing in a small flamenco company, playing guitar, and singing South American folk songs. This experience had a seminal influence on her future career.

Returning to Washington, D.C. for her last two years of high school, Wood studied painting at the Corcoran Gallery and then attended Oberlin College, graduating in 1950. While at Oberlin College, Wood met and married musician Robert Wood. She was soon drawn to the program of Moholy-Nagy's Bauhaus Institute of Design in Chicago and its pioneering approaches to the visual arts, architecture, and design. While experimenting with the dimensionality of sculpture combined with improvised movement in her student dance classes, she had an epiphany: "I discovered I could BE the sculpture!" This led to two summer sessions with Hanya Holm at Colorado College and further solidified her shift from painting to dance.

== Career ==
=== Merce Cunningham Dance Company ===
In New York City, her professional apprenticeship began with the Alwin Nikolais Company at the Henry Street Playhouse (1951-1957). This was followed by five years performing in the early Merce Cunningham Dance Company (1958-1963) and touring with John Cage, Robert Rauschenberg, Merce Cunningham, and five other dancers: Carolyn Brown, Viola Farber, Remy Charlip, Judith Dunn and Steve Paxton. They toured in a VW bus with John Cage as music director and driver and Robert Rauschenberg as set, lighting, and costume designer. Wood danced in several notable pieces, including "Summerspace," "Rune," "Antic Meet," and "Crises".

=== The Celebration Group ===
In 1968, inspired by her exposure to the environmental theatre of Anna Halprin, she stopped dancing and formed Marilyn Wood and the Celebration Group. This group of 8-12 dancers, visual artists, filmmakers, architects, and musicians experimented with site-specific performance in many NYC venues. The genesis of her Celebration vision was a combination of her experience in the avant-garde art world as a dancer, and her history of living in a Latin culture.

=== Celebrations in City Places: The Seagram Building ===
In 1972, Marilyn Wood and the Celebration Group produced Wood's "Celebrations in City Places" series. The most ambitious of these was a site-specific performance at the Seagram Building on Park Avenue, New York City. Her choreography of this event used all forty-four stories of the façade, the lobby, and the plaza. The work featured thirty-five dancers, both inside and outside, original music, film projection, and audience participation in the grand finale.

The success of the Seagram project garnered her honorary membership in the American Institute of Architects (AIA) and launched her international career, generating commissions for numerous US cities (Charlotte, North Carolina, Kansas City, Missouri, Columbus, Ohio, Little Rock, Arkansas, Tulsa, Oklahoma, and Denver, Colorado) and international cities (Berlin, Germany, Singapore, Tehran, Iran, Hong Kong, Rio de Janeiro, Brazil, and Adelaide, Australia).

=== Selected events ===
- 1997 El Paso, Texas/Juarez, Mexico: Rio Grande/Bravo Cross-Border Celebration. Performance honoring the shared river, connecting on the International Bridge
- 1992 Charlotte, North Carolina: Nationsbank Corporate Center Grand Opening Celebration. Daylight fireworks, fountain dances, rapeller choreography, atrium aerial ballet, evening roof-edge and scaffold dances, 6 story mega-images of "Faces of Charlotte", and a 300-voice cantata and drumming for nighttime fireworks
- 1974 New York City: "Rain ‘n' Shine Events for Flowertime"; Lincoln Center Plaza
- 1972 New York City: "Celebrations in City Places"; Seagram Building and Plaza

=== Celebrations choreography ===
Wood's process often began with use of environmental scores to involve the creativity of local community artists participating in the initial ideas of the site design. This process was highlighted in "Citysenses," a show that ran for three weeks in 1969 at the Museum of Contemporary Crafts in New York City. Her resulting choreography typically brought together all aspects of the site with a focus on giving the large audience physical access to the site, often from many directions. As the audience arrived, local groups performed simultaneously at all the entry points. The choreography included dance sequences on rooftops, in windows, fountains, plazas, parks, and waterfronts. A variety of sensory experiences contributed to the work, including original music, soundscapes, fire and sky sculpture, inflatable forms, site-generated films and video, and fireworks at both daytime and at night. The design of the event featured deliberate choreographic gestures to move the attention of the audience to one aspect of the site to another. In the finale, the audience joined the dancing and shared the energy of the event in the streets.

== Later years ==
In 1987, Wood moved to Santa Fe, New Mexico and founded the International Center for Celebration (ICC), an international network of artists whose innovative forms embraced the spirit, scale, and energy of the environmental and cultural venues of each project. The ICC received many grants from the National Endowment for the Arts, including a Creative Artist Fellowship to Japan and a grant from the New York State Council on the Arts. In 2013, Wood received a Lifetime Achievement Award from the American Dance Guild. She gave keynote speeches at international conferences and participated in residencies and workshops around the world.

== Death ==
Marilyn Wood died on June 16, 2016.
