= Renée de Merode =

Countess d'Oultremont

Princess Renée de Merode, Countess d'Oultremont (25 May 1859, in Paris – 25 October 1941) was a Belgian aristocrat, who was married to the Court Grand Marshal of the King of Belgium.

== Family ==
On 21 February 1881 she married Count Charles John d'Oultremont. They had three children. Her husband had a prominent career in the service of the King of the Belgians. He was almost killed in the assassination attempt on the King by Gennaro Rubino in 1902. During the First World War he was sent to Holzminden internment camp, and died following his return to Belgium.

== Charities ==
She belonged to the high aristocracy, and was a member of the court. Like all noble ladies, she was expected to undertake works of charity for the needy.

In 1914 she joined the Red Cross. She received permission from the Germans to visit the Allied wounded, together with other noble ladies. In the Palace of the Royal Academie she spent hours visiting, helping serious wounded soldiers and giving them religious comfortment. In 1916 she became the President of the La Sante à l'Enfance. Even after the death of her husband she continued to help needy children. For her exceptional merit the King awarded her in 1919 the Order of Leopold. After her death in 1941 the dowager Countess of Oultremont left a diary of more than 4000 pages.

== Books ==
She probably wrote for Mgr. Cardijn the work Childhood, Youth, and Martyrdom of Gabrielle Petit.

== Honours ==
- 1919, By RD of the King made Knight in the Order of Leopold
