= Funeral party =

Funeral party may refer to:

- Some of the participants at a funeral
- Funeral Party, a four-piece American band
- The Funeral Party (film), a 2007 Russian film
- "The Funeral Party", a song by The Cure from the 1981 album, Faith
- Funeral Party, a book series published 1995 and 1997, edited by Shade Rupe
