= Game of Death (disambiguation) =

Game of Death is an incomplete Hong Kong film directed, written, produced and starring Bruce Lee, who died during its production.

Game of Death can also refer to:

- A Game of Death, a 1945 adventure film
- Game of Death II, a 1981 sequel to the Bruce Lee film using recycled footage from other Bruce Lee films
- Game of Death (2010 film), a direct-to-DVD action film starring Wesley Snipes
- Game of Death (2017 film), a horror film
- The Suicide Club (2000 film), an American-Irish film also known as The Game of Death
- 13 Beloved, a 2006 Thai film also known as 13: Game of Death

== See also ==
- Le Jeu de la Mort (English: The Game of Death), a 2009 French documentary
