= Funeral Song =

1908 orchestral work by Igor Stravinsky

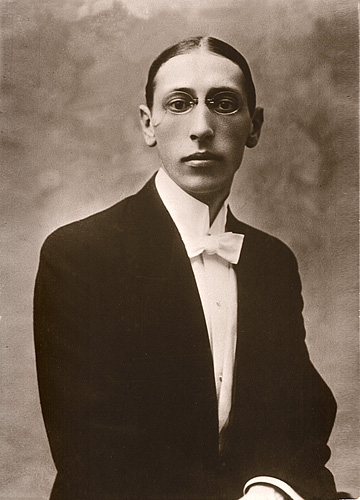
Igor Stravinsky c. 1905

Funeral Song (Погребальная песнь / Pogrebal'naya Pesnya, or Chant funèbre), Op. 5, is an orchestral work by Igor Stravinsky. Composed in 1908 in memory of Nikolai Rimsky-Korsakov, the work received one performance in 1909. The work was then lost and not rediscovered until 2015.

== Early history ==
Stravinsky composed the work in 1908, upon the death of his teacher Nikolai Rimsky-Korsakov. It received its first performance on 17 January 1909 at the Grand Hall of the St Petersburg Conservatory, in a memorial programme for Rimsky-Korsakov. The orchestra of Count Sheremetev performed the work, conducted by Felix Blumenfeld.

The score was lost after the first performance. Stravinsky later called the work "the best of my works before The Firebird, and the most advanced in chromatic harmony." Paul Griffiths commented on Stravinsky's recollections of the work as follows, at a time when the manuscript was still considered to be lost:

'Here already is one of the central lessons of Stravinsky's music. As for those larger moments that are the complete works, what might have been the next step is missing, since the Chant funebre is lost. Stravinsky's own recollection in the 1930s was of a piece in which "all the solo instruments of the orchestra filed past the tomb of the master in succession, each laying down its own melody as its wreath against a deep background of tremolo murmurings simulating the vibrations of bass..."'

== Rediscovery ==
In the spring of 2015, Irina Sidorenko, a staff librarian at the Saint Petersburg Conservatory, discovered a set of orchestral parts for the work, uncatalogued and untouched for decades, buried amongst many uncatalogued scores. Sidorenko alerted musicologist Natalya Braginskaya to the existence of these orchestral parts. Braginskaya confirmed the identity of the parts as belonging to the lost Stravinsky work Funeral Song.

A year of negotiations between the conservatory, the Stravinsky family, and the publisher Boosey & Hawkes followed. After preparation of a new full score, the work received its second performance and its first performance since being rediscovered on 2 December 2016, with the Mariinsky Theatre Orchestra conducted by Valery Gergiev. The work has since received multiple performances in other countries. The first commercial recording of the work was issued in 2018 by Decca with Riccardo Chailly conducting the Lucerne Festival Orchestra.

== Recordings ==
- Decca Classics 28948325627: Lucerne Festival Orchestra; Riccardo Chailly, conductor (premiere recording)
- Pentatone PTC 5186650: Luxembourg Philharmonic Orchestra; Gustavo Gimeno, conductor
- Capriccio C5352: Vienna Radio Symphony Orchestra; Cornelius Meister, conductor
- Munich Philharmonic Orchestra 0746935760007: Valery Gergiev, conductor (2020)
- Deutsche Grammophon: The Philadelphia Orchestra; Yannick Nézet-Séguin, conductor (2021)
