= Simple Minds discography =

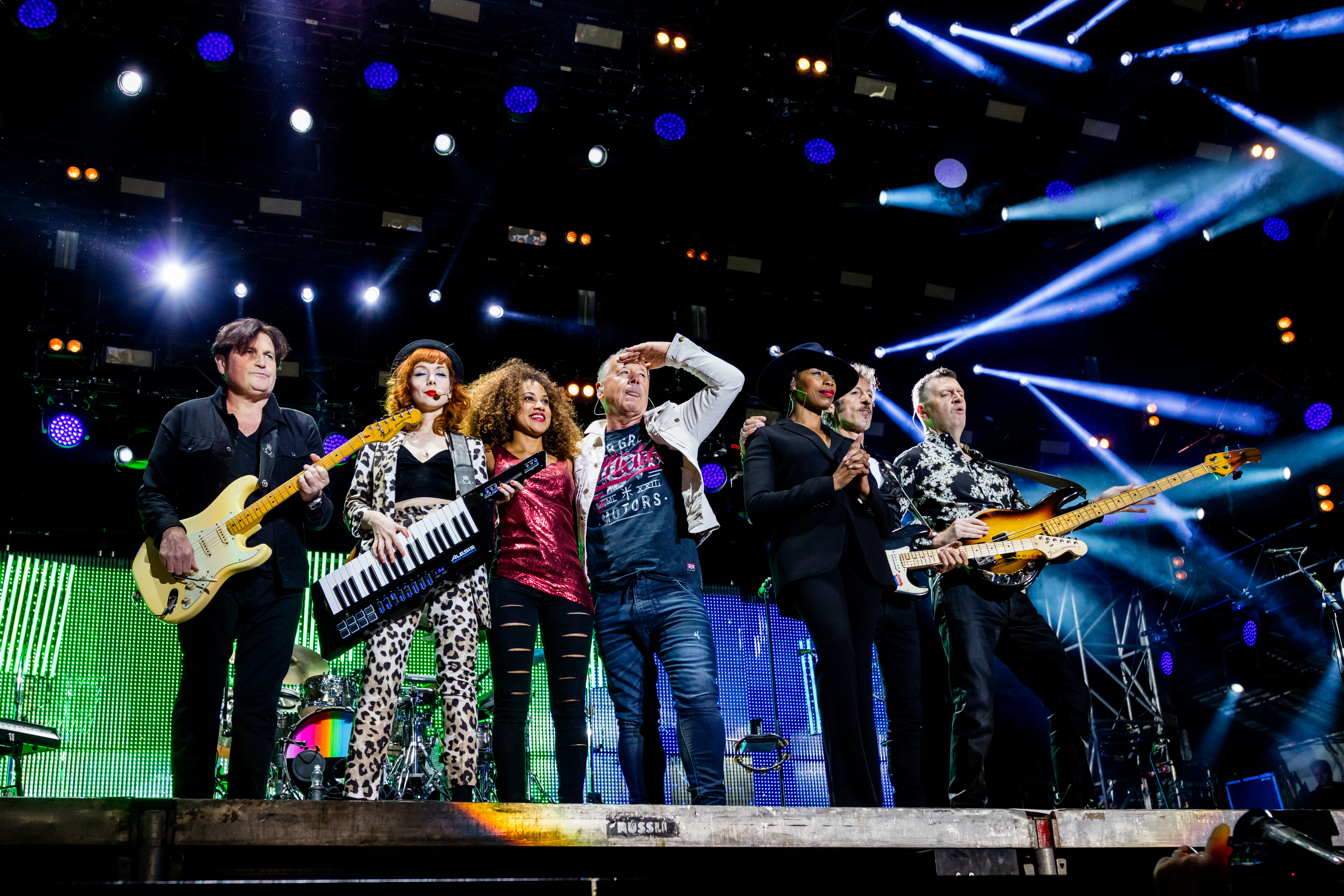
- Simple Minds at Rock the Ring, 2018
- Studio albums: 19
- Extended plays: 7
- Live albums: 12
- Compilation albums: 10
- Singles: 72
- Video albums: 5
- Music videos: 55
- Promotional singles: 12
- Box sets: 14
- Website releases: 7

The Scottish rock band Simple Minds has released 19 studio albums, eleven live albums, ten compilation albums, fourteen box sets, four EPs, 75 singles, and five video albums. The band formed in Glasgow under the name Johnny & the Self-Abusers in 1977 before releasing their debut album Life in a Day (1979) under the Simple Minds name. The album achieved moderate commercial success for the band, reaching the top forty of the albums charts in the United Kingdom. Their second album, Real to Real Cacophony, was released at the end of 1979 and failed to chart, whilst their third album, Empires and Dance (1980) just missed the top forty in the United Kingdom. Their fourth album, the double album release Sons and Fascination/Sister Feelings Call (1981) produced the commercially successful single "Love Song" which became their highest charting single in the United Kingdom up until that point.

In 1982, they released their fifth studio album, New Gold Dream (81/82/83/84), which marked the beginning of increased popularity and commercial success for the band. Considered one of the "defining albums of the new wave movement of the early 1980s", it produced the critically acclaimed singles "Promised You a Miracle", "Glittering Prize" and "Someone Somewhere in Summertime", all of which performed strongly in singles charts across European territories as well as in some international markets including Australia and New Zealand. The album was both commercially and critically successful, peaking within the top five in the United Kingdom and New Zealand, and was as becoming their first album to chart within the US Billboard 200 albums charts. It was certified Platinum by the British Phonographic Industry (BPI) for sales in excess of 300,000 copies. In November 1983, they released "Waterfront" was the lead single from their sixth album, Sparkle in the Rain (1984).

Immediately before the release of Sparkle in the Rain in February 1984, the band released the second single from the album, "Speed Your Love to Me". The album marked the beginning of increased media interest in the band, and became their first album to reach number one in the albums charts in the United Kingdom where it was certified Platinum by the BPI. It achieved moderate commercial success in the United States, an international territory where the band were to experience a significant commercial breakthrough in 1985 with the release of the single "Don't You (Forget About Me)" which was recorded for inclusion in the movie The Breakfast Club. It reached number one on the US Billboard Hot 100 and remained on the chart for a total of 22 weeks. Commercial success in the United States continued with their next single, "Alive and Kicking" which supported the release of their seventh studio album Once Upon a Time (1985).

In May 1989, they released their eighth album Street Fighting Years which was supported by its lead single "Belfast Child". The song became the bands first single to reach number one on the singles charts in the United Kingdom. Described as a more political album than the bands previous releases, a promotional single, "Mandela Day" was released in the United States in February 1989. The album was certified 2× Platinum by the BPI in the United Kingdom, and sold in excess of 2 million copies across Europe. Further album releases – Real Life (1991) and Good News from the Next World (1995) continued commercial success for the band, before experiencing a decline in popularity with the release of Néapolis (1998), Neon Lights (2001) and Cry (2002). The album Black & White 050505 (2005) achieved moderate commercial success, including in Italy where it was certified Gold by the Federazione Industria Musicale Italiana (FMI).

The band returned to commercial prominence in 2009 with the release of their fifteenth studio album Graffiti Soul, a trend which continued with further releases Big Music (2014), Acoustic (2016), Walk Between Worlds (2018) and Direction of the Heart (2022). Described as "one of the most commercially successful Scottish bands of the 1980s", Simple Minds have sold more than 60 million albums worldwide. They were awarded the Q Inspiration Award in 2014 for their contribution to the music industry and an Ivor Novello Award in 2016 for Outstanding Song Collection from the British Academy of Songwriters, Composers, and Authors (BASCA). Their other notable recognitions include nominations for both the MTV Video Music Award for Best Direction and MTV Video Music Award for Best Art Direction for "Don't You (Forget About Me)" in 1985, nomination for the Brit Award for British Group in 1986 and for the American Music Award for Favorite Pop/Rock Band/Duo/Group in 1987.

== Albums ==
=== Studio albums ===
Title	Album details	Peak chart positions										Certifications
Title	Album details	UK	AUS	CAN	GER	ITA	NL	NZ	SWE	SWI	US	Certifications
Life in a Day	Released: 20 April 1979; Label: Zoom, PVC; Formats: LP, MC	30	—	—	—	—	—	—	—	—	—	
Real to Real Cacophony	Released: 23 November 1979; Label: Zoom; Formats: LP, MC	—	—	—	—	—	—	—	—	—	—	
Empires and Dance	Released: 12 September 1980; Label: Zoom; Formats: LP, MC	41	—	—	—	—	—	47	—	—	—	
Sons and Fascination	Released: 4 September 1981; Label: Virgin; Formats: 2×LP, LP, MC; Initially released as a double album before being released as two separate albums on 16 October 1981	11	31	46	—	—	—	7	4	—	—	UK: Gold
Sister Feelings Call	Released: 4 September 1981; Label: Virgin; Formats: 2×LP, LP, MC; Initially released as a double album before being released as two separate albums on 16 October 1981	11	—	—	—	—	—	—	—	—	—	UK: Gold
New Gold Dream (81–82–83–84)	Released: 17 September 1982; Label: Virgin, A&M; Formats: LP, MC	3	8	57	47 (Note: Peak position for the 2016 re-release.)	—	31	2	9	—	69	UK: Platinum; CAN: Gold; FRA: Gold; NL: Platinum; NZ: Platinum; SWE: Gold
Sparkle in the Rain	Released: 6 February 1984; Label: Virgin, A&M; Formats: CD, LP, MC	1	15	14	14	10	2	1	2	19	64	UK: Platinum; CAN: Gold; FRA: Gold; NZ: Gold
Once Upon a Time	Released: 21 October 1985; Label: Virgin, A&M; Formats: CD, LP, MC	1	7	3	5	2	1	3	4	7	10	UK: 3× Platinum; CAN: 2× Platinum; FRA: Gold; GER: 2× Gold; NL: Platinum; NZ: Platinum; US: Gold
Street Fighting Years	Released: 2 May 1989; Label: Virgin, A&M; Formats: CD, LP, MC	1	11	24	1	1	1	4	4	1	70	UK: 2× Platinum; AUS: Gold; CAN: Gold; GER: Platinum; NL: Platinum; SWE: Gold; SWI: Platinum
Real Life	Released: 8 April 1991; Label: Virgin, A&M; Formats: CD, LP, MC, DAT	2	13	17	3	2	6	11	5	2	74	UK: Platinum; AUS: Gold; FRA: 2× Gold; GER: Gold; ITA: 3× Gold; NL: Gold; SWE: Gold; SWI: Platinum
Good News from the Next World	Released: 30 January 1995; Label: Virgin; Formats: CD, LP, MC	2	20	37	4	2	5	8	2	1	87	UK: Gold; FRA: Gold; GER: Gold; ITA: 3× Gold; SWI: Gold
Néapolis	Released: 16 March 1998; Label: Chrysalis; Formats: CD, MC	19	182	—	9	6	22	—	23	7	—	
Neon Lights	Released: 8 October 2001; Label: Eagle; Formats: CD, HDCD, MC	141	—	—	58	—	—	—	—	65	—	
Cry	Released: 1 April 2002; Label: Eagle; Formats: CD, SACD, MC	80	—	—	38	14	56	—	—	35	—	
Black & White 050505	Released: 12 September 2005; Label: Sanctuary; Formats: CD	37	—	—	6	7	25	—	46	20	—	ITA: Gold
Graffiti Soul	Released: 25 May 2009; Label: Sanctuary; Formats: CD, 2×CD, 2×LP	10	128	—	14	11	29	—	—	8	—	
Big Music	Released: 31 October 2014; Label: Caroline International; Formats: CD, 2×CD+DVD, 2×LP	12	—	—	16	17	22	—	—	20	—	
Acoustic	Released: 11 November 2016; Label: Caroline International; Formats: CD, 2×LP, digital download	16	—	—	39	31	27	—	—	33	—	UK: Silver
Walk Between Worlds	Released: 2 February 2018; Label: BMG; Formats: CD, LP, digital download	4	82	—	7	14	23	—	41	5	—	
Direction of the Heart	Released: 21 October 2022; Label: BMG; Formats: CD, LP, MC, digital download	4	—	—	7	21	7	—	38	7	—	
Sacrosanct	Scheduled: 29 January 2027; Label: BMG; Formats: CD, LP, digital download	To be released										
"—" denotes releases that did not chart or were not released in that territory.

=== Unreleased studio album ===
Title	Album details
Our Secrets Are the Same	Released: 18 October 2004 (as part of Silver Box); Label: Virgin; Formats: CD; Originally set for release in 2000

=== Live albums ===
Title	Album details	Peak chart positions										Certifications
Title	Album details	UK	AUS	CAN	GER	ITA	NL	NZ	SWE	SWI	US	Certifications
Live in the City of Light	Released: 26 May 1987; Label: Virgin, A&M; Formats: 2×CD, 2×LP, 2×MC	1	13	26	3	6	1	14	5	5	96	UK: 2× Platinum; FRA: Gold; GER: Gold; NL: Gold
Real Live 91	Released: 1 May 1998; Label: Mindmood; Formats: CD; Fanclub-only release	—	—	—	—	—	—	—	—	—	—	
Sunday Express – Live (Volumes 1 & 2)	Released: 15 & 22 April 2007; Label: Sunday Express; Formats: 2×CD	—	—	—	—	—	—	—	—	—	—	
Live 2011	Released: June & July 2011; Label: Concert Live; Formats: 3×CD, 2×CD	—	—	—	—	—	—	—	—	—	—	
5X5 Live	Released: 19 November 2012; Label: Virgin; Formats: 2×CD	129	—	—	—	80	—	—	—	—	—	
Live Australia 2012	Released: November & December 2012; Label: DiscLive Network/EMI; Formats: 2×CD	—	—	—	—	—	—	—	—	—	—	
Celebrate – The Greatest Hits+ Tour 2013	Released: April & November 2013; Label: Concert Live; Formats: 3×CD, 2×CD	—	—	—	—	—	—	—	—	—	—	
Celebrate – Live at the SSE Hydro Glasgow	Released: June 2014; Label: Edsel, Simple Minds Ltd.; Formats: 2×CD+DVD, 2×CD+2xDVD (Note: This limited edition Deluxe DVD book set includes 4 discs: 1 21-track DVD of the entire concert filmed and recorded on 27 November 2013 at the SSE Hydro, Glasgow, UK; 1 DVD of exclusive interview footage and photo gallery; 2 fully mixed audio CDs of the entire concert + a bound book featuring specially-written notes and exclusive live photos from the Celebrate tour + photographic print individually autographed by the band.)	—	—	—	—	—	—	—	—	—	—	
Live – Big Music Tour 2015	Released: 14 November 2015; Label: Demon/Simple Minds Ltd.; Formats: 2×CD, digital download	—	—	—	—	—	—	—	—	—	—	
Acoustic in Concert	Released: 16 June 2017; Label: Eagle Vision/Universal Music/BBC Music; Formats: CD+DVD	—	—	—	—	—	—	—	—	—	—	
Live in the City of Angels	Released: 4 October 2019; Label: BMG; Formats: 2×CD, 4×CD, 4×LP, digital download	9	—	—	23	43	56	—	—	44	—	
New Gold Dream – Live from Paisley Abbey	Released: 27 October 2023; Label: BMG; Formats: red & black marble vinyl, CD & digital download	23	—	—	17	42	12	—	—	21	—	
Live in the City of Diamonds	Released: 25 April 2025; Label: BMG; Formats: 2×CD, 2×LP	20	—	—	7	59	7	—	—	15	—	
"—" denotes releases that did not chart or were not released in that territory.

=== Compilation albums ===
Title	Album details	Peak chart positions									Certifications
Title	Album details	UK	AUS	CAN	GER	ITA	NL	NZ	SWE	SWI	Certifications
Celebration	Released: 5 February 1982; Label: Virgin; Formats: LP, MC	45	—	—	—	25 (Note: Chart position in 1985.)	—	—	—	—	
Themes for Great Cities – Definitive Collection 79–81	Released: February 1982; Label: Stiff; Formats: LP, MC	—	—	—	—	—	—	—	—	—	
Glittering Prize 81/92	Released: 12 October 1992; Label: Virgin, A&M; Formats: CD, LP, MC, MD	1	1	37	10	14	7	1	17	14	UK: 3× Platinum; AUS: Platinum; CAN: Gold; FRA: Platinum; GER: Gold; NL: Platinum; NZ: Platinum; SWE: Gold
The Promised	Released: 29 September 1997; Label: Virgin; Formats: CD	—	—	—	97	—	45	—	—	—	
The Best of Simple Minds	Released: 5 November 2001; Label: Virgin; Formats: 2×CD, 2×SACD, 2×MC	34	—	—	67	44	11	39	—	64	UK: Gold; IT: Gold; NL: Gold
Early Gold	Released: 30 June 2003; Label: Virgin; Formats: CD	—	—	—	—	—	—	—	—	—	
Live & Rare	Released: December 2003; Label: Carosello/Absolutely/Virgin/Mindmood; Formats: CD	—	—	—	—	—	—	—	—	—	
Celebrate: The Greatest Hits	Released: 25 March 2013; Label: Virgin; Formats: CD, 2×CD, 3×CD, digital download	19	—	—	—	64	86	—	—	55	UK: Gold
Icon	Released: 14 May 2013; Label: Virgin; Formats: CD	—	—	—	—	—	—	—	—	—	
40: The Best of 1979–2019	Released: 1 November 2019; Label: Universal Music; Formats: CD, 3×CD, 2×LP, digital download	27	—	—	75	—	68	—	—	72	UK: Silver; RMNZ: Platinum
"—" denotes releases that did not chart or were not released in that territory.

=== Box sets ===
Title	Album details	Peak chart positions		
Title	Album details	UK	GER	NL
Themes – Volume 1: March 79–April 82	Released: 8 October 1990; Label: Virgin; Formats: 5xCDS	—	—	—
Themes – Volume 2: August 82–April 85	Released: 17 September 1990; Label: Virgin; Formats: 5×CDS	—	—	—
Themes – Volume 3: September 85–June 87	Released: 8 October 1990; Label: Virgin; Formats: 5×CDS	—	—	—
Themes – Volume 4: February 89–May 90	Released: 15 October 1990; Label: Virgin; Formats: 5×CDS	—	—	—
Collectors' Edition	Released: December 1990; Label: Virgin; Formats: 3×CD	—	—	—
Silver Box	Released: 18 October 2004; Label: Virgin; Formats: 5×CD	—	—	—
Themes – Volume 5: March 91–September 92	Released: 23 June 2008; Label: Virgin; Formats: 5×CDS	—	—	—
Themes – Volumes 1–5: March 79–September 92	Released: 23 June 2008; Label: Virgin; Formats: 25×CDS	—	—	—
X5	Released: 20 February 2012; Label: Virgin; Formats: 6×CD	28	99	49
5 Album Set	Released: 12 October 2012; Label: EMI; Formats: 5×CD	—	—	—
Classic Album Selection	Released: 25 November 2013; Label: Virgin; Formats: 5×CD	—	—	—
Celebrate – The Greatest Hits+ Tour 2013	Released: January 2015; Label: Concert Live; Formats: 12×CD	—	—	—
The Vinyl Collection 79–84	Released: 30 October 2015; Label: Universal Music; Formats: 7×LP	—	—	—
Rejuvenation 2001–2014	Released: 7 November 2018; Label: Demon; Formats: 6×LP, 7×CD+DVD	—	—	—
"—" denotes releases that did not chart or were not released in that territory.

=== Website releases ===
Title	Details
Black & White Live Bundle 01	Released: 17 April 2006; Label: Simple Minds Ltd.; Formats: digital download
Black & White Live Bundle 02	Released: 4 May 2006; Label: Simple Minds Ltd.; Formats: digital download
Black & White Live Bundle 03	Released: 19 May 2006; Label: Simple Minds Ltd.; Formats: digital download
Black & White Live Bundle 04	Released: 2 June 2006; Label: Simple Minds Ltd.; Formats: digital download
Black & White Live Bundle 05	Released: 26 June 2006; Label: Simple Minds Ltd.; Formats: digital download
Black & White Live Bundle 06	Released: 7 January 2008; Label: Simple Minds Ltd.; Formats: digital download
Black & White Live Bundle 07	Released: 28 February 2008; Label: Simple Minds Ltd.; Formats: digital download

== EPs ==
Title (Note: Two other EPs, Ballad of the Streets and The Amsterdam EP were also released. They are included in the Singles section as they are better known by their lead tracks.)	EP details	Peak chart positions
Title	EP details	AUS
Alive and Kicking (84,85,86)	Released: 20 September 1986; Label: Virgin; Formats: 12", CD, MC; Australia and Japan-only release	26
iTunes Live: London Festival '09	Released: 20 July 2009; Label: Sanctuary/Simple Minds Ltd.; Formats: digital download	—
Live EP Featuring Big Music	Released: February 2014; Label: Simple Minds Ltd.; Formats: CD; Limited release with the Celebrate – Live DVD	—
Big Music – Johnson Somerset Remixes	Released: 1 July 2016; Label: Simple Minds Ltd.; Formats: digital download	—
"—" denotes releases that did not chart or were not released in that territory.

== Singles ==
=== 1970s–1980s ===
Title	Year	Peak chart positions										Certifications	Album
Title	Year	UK	AUS	CAN	GER	IRE	ITA	NL	NZ	SWE	US	Certifications	Album
"Life in a Day"	1979	62	—	—	—	—	—	—	—	—	—		Life in a Day
"Chelsea Girl"	1979	—	—	—	—	—	—	—	—	—	—		Life in a Day
"Changeling"	1980	—	—	—	—	—	—	—	—	—	—		Real to Real Cacophony
"I Travel"	1980	—	—	—	—	—	—	—	—	—	—		Empires and Dance
"Celebrate"	1981	—	—	—	—	—	—	—	—	—	—		Empires and Dance
"The American"	1981	59	—	—	—	—	—	—	—	—	— (Note: These singles also charted on the Billboard Dance Music/Club Play chart as following: "The American" (#66), "I Travel" 1981 re-release (#55), "Promised You a Miracle" (#65), "Don't You (Forget About Me)" (#9), "Alive and Kicking" (#25), "Sanctify Yourself" (#24) and "All the Things She Said" (#5).)		Sister Feelings Call
"Love Song"	1981	47	17	38	—	—	—	—	—	16	—		Sons and Fascination
"Sweat in Bullet"	1981	52	—	—	—	—	—	—	47	17	—		Sons and Fascination
"I Travel" (reissue)	1982	—	—	—	—	—	—	—	—	—	—		Celebration
"Promised You a Miracle"	1982	13	10	—	—	25	—	25	9	17	—		New Gold Dream (81–82–83–84)
"Glittering Prize"	1982	16	9	—	—	11	—	—	4	11	—		New Gold Dream (81–82–83–84)
"Someone Somewhere in Summertime"	1982	36	51	—	—	19	—	—	—	—	—		New Gold Dream (81–82–83–84)
"New Gold Dream (81-82-83-84)" (Italy-only release)	1983	—	—	—	—	—	—	—	—	—	—		New Gold Dream (81–82–83–84)
"I Travel" (2nd reissue)	1983	112	—	—	—	—	—	—	—	—	—		Celebration
"Waterfront"	1983	13	19	—	—	5	—	—	1	16	—		Sparkle in the Rain
"Speed Your Love to Me"	1984	20	76	—	—	9	—	—	46	18	—		Sparkle in the Rain
"Up on the Catwalk"	1984	27	—	—	—	16	—	—	44	—	—		Sparkle in the Rain
"Don't You (Forget About Me)"	1985	7	6	1	4	3	2	2	3	13	1	UK: 3× Platinum; CAN: Platinum; GER: Gold; IT: Platinum; NZ: 5× Platinum	The Breakfast Club (soundtrack)
"Alive and Kicking"	1985	7	21	4	17	2	1	2	5	11	3	UK: Platinum; CAN: Gold; NZ: Platinum	Once Upon a Time
"Sanctify Yourself"	1986	10	46	17	38	4	17	3	22	16	14		Once Upon a Time
"All the Things She Said"	1986	9	46	65	51	4	—	6	20	—	28		Once Upon a Time
"Ghost Dancing"	1986	13	72	—	—	3	—	18	—	—	—		Once Upon a Time
"Promised You a Miracle" (live)	1987	19	—	—	—	8	—	55	—	—	—		Live in the City of Light
Ballad of the Streets EP: "Belfast Child" (lead track) / "Mandela Day" / "Biko"	1989	1	12	—	3	1	2	1	8	11	— (Note: These singles also charted on the Billboard Alternative Songs chart as following: "Mandela Day" from Ballad of the Streets EP (#17), "This Is Your Land" (#12), "Take a Step Back" (#14), "See the Lights" (#1), "Stand by Love" (#4) and "She's a River" (#10).)	UK: Silver	Street Fighting Years
"This Is Your Land"	1989	13	38	40	25	6	3	7	26	18	— (Note: These singles also charted on Billboard Mainstream Rock Tracks chart as following: "Don't You (Forget About Me)" (#1), "Alive and Kicking" (#2), "Sanctify Yourself" (#3), "All the Things She Said" (#9), "This Is Your Land" (#37), "See the Lights" (#10), "She's a River" (#6) and "And the Band Played On" (#40).)		Street Fighting Years
"Kick It In"	1989	15	94	—	65	6	—	34	27	—	—		Street Fighting Years
The Amsterdam EP: "Let It All Come Down" (lead track) / "Sign o' the Times" / "Jerusalem"	1989	18	77	—	40	11	6	16	—	—	—		Street Fighting Years
"—" denotes releases that did not chart or were not released in that territory.

=== 1990s ===
Title	Year	Peak chart positions										Album
Title	Year	UK	AUS	CAN	GER	IRE	ITA	NL	NZ	SWE	US	Album
"Let There Be Love"	1991	6	15	—	16	5	1	7	48	9	—	Real Life
"See the Lights"	1991	20	100	10	48	16	22	42	—	27	40	Real Life
"Stand by Love"	1991	13	70	—	—	14	—	25	—	39	—	Real Life
"Real Life"	1991	34	103	—	—	—	—	–	—	—	—	Real Life
"Love Song" / "Alive and Kicking"	1992	6	—	—	—	24	—	50	—	—	—	Glittering Prize 81/92
"She's a River"	1995	9	29	3	39	17	3	18	21	26	52	Good News from the Next World
"Hypnotised"	1995	18	85	34	62	28	18	—	—	—	—	Good News from the Next World
"Glitterball"	1998	18	—	—	—	—	3	72	—	—	—	Néapolis
"War Babies"	1998	43	—	—	—	—	—	—	—	—	—	Néapolis
"—" denotes releases that did not chart or were not released in that territory.

=== 2000s–present ===
Title	Year	Peak chart positions					Album
Title	Year	UK	AUS	GER	ITA	NL	Album
Dancing Barefoot EP: "Dancing Barefoot" (lead track) / "Gloria" / "Being Boiled" / "Love Will Tear Us Apart"	2001	—	—	—	—	—	Neon Lights
"Homosapien"	2001	134	—	—	—	—	Neon Lights
"Belfast Trance" (John '00' Fleming/Simple Minds)	2002	74	—	—	—	—	Non-album single
"Cry"	2002	47	—	92	25	65	Cry
"Spaceface"	2002	—	—	—	—	—	Cry
"New Sunshine Morning" (Germany-only release)	2002	—	—	—	—	—	Cry
"One Step Closer"	2002	—	—	—	—	—	Cry
"Monster" (Liquid People vs Simple Minds)	2002	67	—	—	—	—	Non-album single
"Don't You (Forget About Me)" (remixes) (Note: The remixes of "Don't You (Forget About Me)", released between 2003 and 2004, were released under different artist names, depending on the territory; in Europe by Simple Minds, in Australia by White Spaces featuring Jim Kerr.)	2003	—	92	—	16	—	Live & Rare
"Dirty Old Town" (with Jimmy Johnstone)	2004	46	—	—	—	—	Live & Rare
"Too Much Television" (iTunes-only download)	2005	—	—	—	—	—	Black & White 050505
"Home"	2005	41	—	53	18	77	Black & White 050505
"Stranger"	2006	—	—	97	—	—	Black & White 050505
"Different World (Taormina.me)"	2006	—	—	—	—	—	Black & White 050505
"Rockets"	2009	146	—	—	44	—	Graffiti Soul
"Stars Will Lead the Way"	2009	—	—	88	—	—	Graffiti Soul
"Theme for Great Cities" (Moby remix)	2012	—	—	—	—	—	Non-album single
"Broken Glass Park"	2013	—	—	—	—	—	Celebrate: The Greatest Hits
"Blood Diamonds"	2013	—	—	—	—	—	Celebrate: The Greatest Hits
"Honest Town"	2014	—	—	—	—	—	Big Music
"Let the Day Begin"	2014	—	—	—	—	—	Big Music
"Midnight Walking"	2014	—	—	—	—	—	Big Music
"(Get A) Grip (On Yourself)" (vs the Stranglers; limited release)	2015	—	—	—	—	—	Non-album single
"Promised You a Miracle" (featuring KT Tunstall)	2016	—	—	—	—	—	Acoustic
"Magic"	2018	—	—	—	—	—	Walk Between Worlds
"The Signal and the Noise"	2018	—	—	—	—	—	Walk Between Worlds
"Sense of Discovery"	2018	—	—	—	—	—	Walk Between Worlds
"Summer"	2018	—	—	—	—	—	Walk Between Worlds
"Love Song" (live)	2019	—	—	—	—	—	Live in the City of Angels
"Promised You a Miracle" (live)	2019	—	—	—	—	—	Live in the City of Angels
"For One Night Only"	2019	—	—	—	—	—	40: The Best of 1979–2019
"Act of Love"	2022	—	—	—	—	—	Direction of the Heart
"Vision Thing"	2022	—	—	—	—	—	Direction of the Heart
"First You Jump"	2022	—	—	—	—	—	Direction of the Heart
"Traffic"	2023	—	—	—	—	—	Direction of the Heart
"Solstice Kiss"	2023	—	—	—	—	—	Direction of the Heart
"Someone Somewhere (In Summertime) – Live at Paisley Abbey"	2023	—	—	—	—	—	New Gold Dream – Live at Paisley Abbey
"Promised You a Miracle – Live at Paisley Abbey"	2023	—	—	—	—	—	New Gold Dream – Live at Paisley Abbey
"Get It On" (with Icehouse)	2023	—	—	—	—	—	Non-album single
"—" denotes releases that did not chart or were not released in that territory.

=== Promotional singles ===
Title	Year	Peak chart positions	Album
Title	Year	US	Album
"Once Upon a Time" (US-only release)	1986	—	Once Upon a Time
"Take a Step Back" (US-only release)	1989	—	Street Fighting Years
"Mandela Day" (US-only release)	1989	—	Street Fighting Years
"Travelling Man" (Spain-only release)	1992	—	Real Life
"And the Band Played On" (US-only release)	1995	—	Good News from the Next World
"Night Music" (Italy-only release)	1995	—	Good News from the Next World
"Great Leap Forwards" (France-only release)	1995	—	Good News from the Next World
"Dancing Barefoot"	2001	—	Neon Lights
"The Jeweller (Part 2)"	2006	—	Black & White 050505
"Stay Visible" (Australia-only release)	2006	—	Black & White 050505
"This Is It" (Austria-only release)	2009	—	Graffiti Soul
"Sanctify Yourself"	2016	—	Acoustic
"—" denotes releases that did not chart or were not released in that territory.

== Videos ==
=== Video albums ===
Title	Album details
Verona	Released: May 1990; Label: Virgin Video; Formats: VHS
Glittering Prize 81/92	Released: 12 October 1992; Label: Virgin Video; Formats: VHS
Seen the Lights – A Visual History	Released: 28 October 2003; Label: Virgin Video; Formats: 2×DVD; First disc includes the majority of the band's promotional videos up to that point. Second disc is devoted to the 1990 Verona concert (previously issued on VHS) and a 1983 concert in Newcastle.
Celebrate – Live at the SSE Hydro Glasgow	Released: June 2014; Label: Edsel, Simple Minds Ltd.; Formats: DVD, 2×DVD, Blu-ray
Acoustic in Concert	Released: 16 June 2017; Label: Eagle Vision/Universal Music/BBC Music; Formats: DVD, Blu-ray

=== Music videos ===
Title	Year	Director
"Chelsea Girl"	1979	Rock Biz Pix
"Love Song"	1981	Russell Mulcahy
"Sweat in Bullet"	1981	Russell Mulcahy
"Promised You a Miracle"	1982	Steve Barron
"Glittering Prize"	1982	Unknown
"Waterfront"	1983	John Scarlett-Davis
"Speed Your Love to Me"	1984	John Scarlett-Davis
"Up on the Catwalk"	1984	John Scarlett-Davis
"Don't You (Forget About Me)"	1985	Daniel Kleinman
"Alive and Kicking"	1985	Zbigniew Rybczyński
"Sanctify Yourself"	1986	Keef
"All the Things She Said"	1986	Zbigniew Rybczyński
"Ghostdancing"	1986	N/A
"Promised You a Miracle" (live)	1987	John Scarlett-Davis
"Belfast Child"	1989	Andy Morahan
"Mandela Day"	1989	Andy Morahan
"This Is Your Land"	1989	Andy Morahan
"Kick It In"	1989	Andy Morahan
"Let It All Come Down"	1989	Unknown
"Sign o' the Times"	1989	Andy Morahan
"Let There Be Love" (Narrative Cut)	1991	Andy Morahan
"Let There Be Love" (Performance Cut)	1991	Andy Morahan
"See the Lights" (Approved Version)	1991	Andy Morahan
"See the Lights" (Unapproved Version)	1991	Steve Barron
"Stand by Love"	1991	Nigel Dick
"Real Life"	1991	Unknown
"Love Song"	1992	Mark Alchin
"She's a River"	1995	Kevin Kerslake
"Hypnotised"	1995	W.I.Z.
"Glitterball"	1998	Andy Earl & Stuart MacKenzie
"War Babies"	1998	Michael Geoghegan
"Dancing Barefoot"	2001	Ed Sayers
"Cry"	2002	Snorri Brothers
"Home"	2005	Andy Roberts
"Rockets"	2009	Chris Debney
"Stars Will Lead the Way"	2009	Phil Tidy
"This Is It"	2009	Phil Tidy
"Broken Glass Park"	2013	Unknown
"Blindfolded"	2014	Damien Reeves
"Honest Town"	2014	Giorgio Testi
"Let the Day Begin"	2014	Damien Reeves
"Midnight Walking"	2014	Roger Sargent
"(Get a) Grip (On Yourself)"	2015	N/A
"Blindfolded" (Johnson Somerset remix)	2016	Damien Reeves
"Honest Town" (Johnson Somerset remix)	2016	Giorgio Testi
"Midnight Walking" (Johnson Somerset remix)	2016	Roger Sargent
"Big Music" (Johnson Somerset remix)	2016	N/A
"Promised You a Miracle" (Artwork Video)	2016	N/A
"The American" (Artwork Video)	2016	N/A
"Alive and Kicking" (Artwork Video)	2016	N/A
"Chelsea Girl" (Artwork Video)	2016	N/A
"Don't You Forget (About Me)" (Artwork Video)	2016	N/A
"Promised You a Miracle" (Band Video)	2016	N/A
"Magic"	2018	Esteban Diacono
"For One Night Only"	2019	Various
