= Live in the City of Angels =

2019 live album by Simple Minds

Live album by Simple Minds
- Released: 4 October 2019
- Recorded: 24 October 2018; 8 November 2018
- Venue: Orpheum Theatre (Los Angeles, California); Fillmore-Gleason Theatre (Miami Beach, Florida) (Glittering Prize only); various venues on tour during soundchecks and rehearsals (expanded edition only)
- Genre: Rock
- Length: 130:31 (standard edition); 206:18 (expanded edition)
- Label: BMG

Simple Minds chronology
Walk Between Worlds (2018)	Live in the City of Angels (2019)	Direction of the Heart (2022)

Live in the City of Angels is the seventh (double) live album by Scottish rock band Simple Minds, released in early October 2019 to document their largest ever North American tour.

== Overview ==
On 20 August 2019, Simple Minds announced the release on 4 October 2019 of Live in the City of Angels, their new live album capturing the band on their biggest ever (31-show) North American tour (24 September–11 November 2018), mostly recorded on 24 October 2018 at the Orpheum Theatre, Los Angeles, California (i.e. the City of Angels). Twenty-four of the tracks were performed that night in Los Angeles, with only "Glittering Prize" being recorded on 8 November 2018 at the Fillmore-Gleason Theatre in Miami Beach. The bonus tracks available on the Deluxe CD and digital formats were recorded at various sound checks and rehearsals. The 40-song collection spans the band's 40-year career.

The album title echoes their first (1987) live album, Live in the City of Light, which was mostly recorded in Paris, France (i.e. the City of Light).

== Release ==
Live in the City of Angels was released on 4 October 2019 and made available on multiple formats: standard double CD, deluxe 4-CD album (4 CDs in a hardback book), 4-vinyl quadpack, digital downloads, and streaming services (plus a signed set list bundle). The standard CD and vinyl format features 25 songs while the Deluxe CD and digital formats feature 40 songs. Though the standard edition contains the whole concert in order (with Glittering Prize added in), it fades the audience out and back in between each song.

== Track listing ==
=== Standard CD (and vinyl) edition ===
All tracks are written by Jim Kerr and Charlie Burchill, except where noted.

Disc 1
No.	Title	Writer(s)	Original album	Length
1.	"The Signal and the Noise"		Walk Between Worlds	5:45
2.	"Waterfront"	Kerr; Burchill; Derek Forbes; Mel Gaynor; Mick MacNeil	Sparkle in the Rain	5:23
3.	"Love Song"	Kerr; Burchill; Forbes; MacNeil; Brian McGee	Sons and Fascination	4:58
4.	"Let There Be Love"		Real Life	4:34
5.	"Up on the Catwalk"	Kerr; Burchill; Forbes; Gaynor; MacNeil	Sparkle in the Rain	4:48
6.	"Sense of Discovery"		Walk Between Worlds	5:50
7.	"Glittering Prize"	Kerr; Burchill; Forbes; MacNeil	New Gold Dream (81–82–83–84)	4:14
8.	"Promised You a Miracle"	Kerr; Burchill; Forbes; MacNeil	New Gold Dream (81–82–83–84)	4:30
9.	"The American"	Kerr; Burchill; Forbes; MacNeil; McGee	Sons and Fascination	4:40
10.	"Hunter and the Hunted"	Kerr; Burchill; Forbes; MacNeil	New Gold Dream (81–82–83–84)	5:37
11.	"Stand By Love"		Real Life	4:48
12.	"Dirty Old Town"	Ewan MacColl	Walk Between Worlds	4:52
13.	"Theme for Great Cities"	Kerr; Burchill; Forbes; MacNeil; McGee	Sons and Fascination	5:05
14.	"She's a River"		Good News from the Next World	3:34
15.	"Walk Between Worlds"		Walk Between Worlds	5:50
16.	"Hypnotised"		Good News from the Next World	5:35
17.	"Someone Somewhere in Summertime"	Kerr; Burchill; Forbes; MacNeil	New Gold Dream (81–82–83–84)	5:32
18.	"See the Lights"		Real Life	5:52
19.	"All the Things She Said"	Kerr; Burchill; MacNeil	Once Upon a Time	4:20
20.	"Dolphins"		Black & White 050505	6:30
21.	"Don't You (Forget About Me)"	Keith Forsey; Steve Schiff	The Breakfast Club (Original Motion Picture Soundtrack)	6:11
22.	"New Gold Dream (81-82-83-84)"		New Gold Dream (81–82–83–84)	5:54
23.	"Once Upon a Time"	Kerr; Burchill; MacNeil	Once Upon a Time	4:42
24.	"Alive and Kicking"	Kerr; Burchill; MacNeil	Once Upon a Time	6:12
25.	"Sanctify Yourself"	Kerr; Burchill; MacNeil	Once Upon a Time	5:18

=== Deluxe CD (and digital) edition bonus tracks ===
All tracks are written by Jim Kerr and Charlie Burchill, except where noted.

Disc 2
No.	Title	Writer(s)	Original album	Length
1.	"Book of Brilliant Things"	Kerr; Burchill; Derek Forbes; Mel Gaynor; Mick MacNeil	Sparkle in the Rain	7:17
2.	"I Travel"	Kerr; Burchill; Forbes; MacNeil; Brian McGee	Empires and Dance	5:01
3.	"Blindfolded"		Big Music	5:15
4.	"Honest Town"	Kerr; Burchill; Iain Cook	Big Music	4:50
5.	"In Dreams"		Walk Between Worlds	4:40
6.	"Stars Will Lead the Way"		Graffiti Soul	4:30
7.	"Big Sleep"	Kerr; Burchill; Forbes; MacNeil	New Gold Dream (81–82–83–84)	5:18
8.	"Let the Day Begin"	Michael Been	Big Music	4:48
9.	"Barrowland Star"		Walk Between Worlds	6:25
10.	"Midnight Walking"	Kerr; Burchill; Andy Gillespie	Big Music	5:11
11.	"Summer"	Kerr; Burchill; Owen Parker	Walk Between Worlds	5:04
12.	"Big Music"	Kerr; Burchill; Andy Gillespie	Big Music	3:11
13.	"Celebrate"	Kerr; Burchill; Forbes; MacNeil; McGee	Empires and Dance	5:43
14.	"The Cross"	Prince		5:13
15.	"Speed Your Love to Me"	Kerr; Burchill; Forbes; Gaynor; MacNeil	Sparkle in the Rain	3:57

- "Let the Day Begin" is a cover of The Call's 1989 song, which Simple Minds first covered on Searching for the Lost Boys (2009) and then again on Big Music (2014).

== Charts ==
Chart (2019)	Peak position
Belgian Albums (Ultratop Flanders)	18
Belgian Albums (Ultratop Wallonia)	20
Dutch Albums (Album Top 100)	56
French Albums (SNEP)	191
German Albums (Offizielle Top 100)	23
Irish Albums (IRMA)	41
Italian Albums (FIMI)	43
Scottish Albums (OCC)	2
Spanish Albums (PROMUSICAE)	30
Swiss Albums (Schweizer Hitparade)	44
UK Albums (OCC)	9
