= Celebrate: The Greatest Hits =

Greatest hits album by Simple Minds
- Released: 25 March 2013
- Recorded: 1979–2013
- Genre: Rock, new wave, post-punk, alternative rock
- Length: 72:49 + 77:41 (two-disc version)
- Label: Virgin Records Single 1: Broken Glass Park; Single 2: Blood Diamonds

Simple Minds chronology
5x5 Live (2012)	Celebrate: The Greatest Hits (2013)	Big Music (2014)

Alternative cover
- The cover of the 3-disc version.

Celebrate: The Greatest Hits is a compilation album by Scottish rock band Simple Minds, released on 25 March 2013. There were three different formats released: a single-disc version for the North American market, a two-disc version, and a three-disc version. The album spans all of their studio albums from 1979's Life in a Day to 2009's Graffiti Soul, which at the time was the latest album Simple Minds released, plus the live version "Promised You a Miracle" from 1987's Live in the City of Light, and new tracks recorded for this compilation: "Stagefright", "Blood Diamonds", and "Broken Glass Park". The 1-disc and 2-disc version come in jewel cases. The 3-disc version comes in a clam shell box which comes with sleeves for each disc (which represent periods in the band's history), a double-sided poster that includes the album's cover art on one side and the cover art for all of the singles included on this compilation on the other side.

== Two-disc version ==
=== Disc 1 ===
1. "Life in a Day" (4:00)
2. "Chelsea Girl" [Edit] (3:59)
3. "Changeling" [Edit] (3:26)
4. "I Travel" [Edit] (3:06)
5. "Celebrate" [Edit] (2:53)
6. "The American" [Edit] (3:32)
7. "Love Song" [Edit] (3:54)
8. "Promised You a Miracle" [Edit] (3:59)
9. "Glittering Prize" [Edit] (3:58)
10. "Someone Somewhere (In Summertime)" (4:37)
11. "Waterfront" [Edit] (4:38)
12. "Speed Your Love to Me" [Edit] (3:59)
13. "Up on the Catwalk" [Edit] (4:04)
14. "Don't You (Forget About Me)" [Single Version] (4:20)
15. "Alive and Kicking" [Edit] (4:45)
16. "Sanctify Yourself" [Edit] (3:55)
17. "All the Things She Said" (4:16)
18. "Ghost Dancing" (4:46)

=== Disc 2 ===
1. "Belfast Child" [Edit] (5:11)
2. "This Is Your Land" [Edit] (4:45)
3. "Kick It In" [Edit] (4:20)
4. "Let There Be Love" [7" Mix] (4:44)
5. "See the Lights" [7" Version Edit] (3:55)
6. "Stand by Love" (4:04)
7. "She's a River" [Edit] (4:29)
8. "Hypnotised" [TLA Edit] (4:34)
9. "Glitterball" [Edit] (4:25)
10. "War Babies" [Bascombe Mix Single Version] (4:19)
11. "Space" [Single Version] (5:28)
12. "Cry" (3:55)
13. "Spaceface" (3:52)
14. "Home" (4:22)
15. "Rockets" [Radio Edit] (3:24)
16. "Stars Will Lead the Way" (3:26)
17. "Blood Diamonds" (3:55) (new song)
18. "Broken Glass Park" (4:09) (new song)

Disc 1 notes

- Tracks 1 and 2 are from Life in a Day (1979)
- Track 3 is from Real to Real Cacophony (1979)
- Tracks 4 and 5 are from Empires and Dance (1980)
- Tracks 6 and 7 are from Sons and Fascination/Sister Feelings Call (1981)
- Tracks 8–10 are from New Gold Dream (81–82–83–84) (1982)
- Tracks 11–13 are from Sparkle in the Rain (1984)
- Track 14 is from The Breakfast Club (Original Motion Picture Soundtrack) (1985)
- Tracks 15–18 are from Once Upon a Time (1985)

Disc 2 notes

- Tracks 1–3 are from Street Fighting Years (1989)
- Tracks 4–6 are from Real Life (1991)
- Tracks 7 and 8 are from Good News from the Next World (1995)
- Tracks 9 and 10 are from Néapolis (1998)
- Track 11 is from Our Secrets Are the Same (recorded 1999, released 2004 in Silver Box)
- Track 12 and 13 are from Cry (2002)
- Track 14 is from Black & White 050505 (2005)
- Tracks 15 and 16 are from Graffiti Soul (2009)
- Tracks 17 and 18 were promoted as new tracks recorded specifically for this compilation, but were later released on Big Music (2014)

== Three-disc version ==
=== Disc 1 ===
1. "Life in a Day" (4:00)
2. "Chelsea Girl" [Edit] (3:59)
3. "Changeling" [Edit] (3:26)
4. "I Travel" [Edit] (3:09)
5. "Celebrate" [Edit] (2:53)
6. "The American" [Edit] (3:32)
7. "Love Song" [Edit] (3:54)
8. "Sweat in Bullet" [Remix] (3:00)
9. "Theme for Great Cities" (5:50)
10. "Promised You a Miracle" [Edit] (4:00)
11. "Glittering Prize" [Edit] (3:58)
12. "Someone Somewhere (In Summertime)" (4:38)
13. "New Gold Dream (81,82,83,84)" [Edit] (4:46)
14. "Waterfront" [Single Version] (4:38)
15. "Speed Your Love to Me" [Edit] (3:59)
16. "Up on the Catwalk" [Edit] (4:04)

=== Disc 2 ===
1. "Don't You (Forget About Me)" [Single Version] (4:20)
2. "Alive and Kicking" [Edit] (4:45)
3. "Sanctify Yourself" [Edit] (3:55)
4. "All the Things She Said" (4:16)
5. "Ghostdancing" (4:46)
6. "Promised You a Miracle" [Live] (4:54)
7. "Belfast Child" [Edit] (5:11)
8. "Mandela Day" (5:41)
9. "Biko" (7:32)
10. "This Is Your Land" [Edit] (4:48)
11. "Kick It In" [Edit] (4:20)
12. "Let It All Come Down" [Edit] (3:37)
13. "Let There Be Love" [7" Mix] (4:44)
14. "See the Lights" [7" Version Edit] (3:55)
15. "Stand by Love" (4:04)
16. "Real Life" [Edit] (3:54)

=== Disc 3 ===
1. "She's a River" [Edit] (4:29)
2. "Hypnotised" [TLA Edit] (4:34)
3. "Glitterball" [Edit] (4:25)
4. "War Babies" [Bascombe Mix Single Version] (4:19)
5. "Space" [Single Version] (5:28)
6. "Jeweller to the Stars" [Single Version] (3:34)
7. "Dancing Barefoot" (3:48)
8. "Cry" (3:55)
9. "Spaceface" (3:52)
10. "One Step Closer" (6:06)
11. "Home" (4:22)
12. "Stranger" (4:07)
13. "Stay Visible" (5:17)
14. "Rockets" [Radio Edit] (3:24)
15. "Stars Will Lead the Way" (3:26)
16. "Stagefright" (4:20) (new song)
17. "Blood Diamonds" (3:55) (new song)
18. "Broken Glass Park" (4:12) (new song)

Disc 1 notes

- Tracks 1 and 2 are from Life in a Day (1979)
- Track 3 is from Real to Real Cacophony (1979)
- Tracks 4 and 5 are from Empires and Dance (1980)
- Tracks 6–9 are from Sons and Fascination/Sister Feelings Call (1981)
- Tracks 10–13 are from New Gold Dream (81–82–83–84) (1982)
- Tracks 14–16 are from Sparkle in the Rain (1984)

Disc 2 notes

- Track 1 is from The Breakfast Club (Original Motion Picture Soundtrack) (1985)
- Tracks 2–5 are from Once Upon a Time (1985)
- Track 6 is from Live in the City of Light (1987)
- Tracks 7–12 are from Street Fighting Years (1989)
- Tracks 13–16 are from Real Life (1991)

Disc 3 notes

- Tracks 1 and 2 are from Good News from the Next World (1995)
- Tracks 3 and 4 are from Néapolis (1998)
- Tracks 5 and 6 are from Our Secrets Are the Same (recorded 1999, released 2004 on Silver Box)
- Track 7 is from Neon Lights
- Tracks 8–10 are from Cry (2002)
- Tracks 11–13 is from Black & White 050505 (2005)
- Tracks 14 and 15 are from Graffiti Soul (2009)
- Track 16 was recorded in 2012 and released as a free download. It was going to be on a new album which did not happen, so was included on this compilation instead.
- Tracks 17–18 were promoted as new tracks recorded specifically for this compilation, but were later rerecorded for Big Music (2014)

== North American version ==
1. "I Travel" [Edit] (3:06)
2. "The American" [Edit] (3:32)
3. "Love Song [Edit] (3:54)
4. "Promised You a Miracle" [Edit] (3:59)
5. "Glittering Prize" [Edit] (3:58)
6. "Someone Somewhere (In Summertime)" (4:37)
7. "Waterfront" [Edit] (4:38)
8. "Speed Your Love to Me" [Edit] (3:59)
9. "Up on the Catwalk" [Edit] (4:04)
10. "Don't You (Forget About Me)" [Single Version] (4:20)
11. "Alive and Kicking" [Edit] (4:45)
12. "Sanctify Yourself" [Edit] (3:55)
13. "All the Things She Said" (4:16)
14. "Belfast Child" [Edit] (5:11)
15. "See the Lights" [7" Version Edit] (3:55)
16. "She's a River" [Edit] (4:29)
17. "Glitterball" [Edit] (4:25)
18. "Blood Diamonds" (3:55) (new song)
19. "Broken Glass Park" (4:09) (new song)

== Certifications ==
Region	Certification	Certified units/sales
United Kingdom (BPI)	Gold	100,000^{‡}
^{‡} Sales+streaming figures based on certification alone.
