= Early Gold =

Compilation album by Simple Minds
- Released: 30 June 2003
- Genres: New wave; post-punk
- Label: Virgin SIMCD 14
- Producers: John Leckie, Steve Hillage, Peter Walsh

Professional ratings
Review scores
Source	Rating
AllMusic	4/5 stars
Muzik	3/5 stars
NME	7/10
PopMatters	7/10
Uncut	5/5 stars

Early Gold is a compilation album of Simple Minds early material, released in 2003. It contains songs from years 1979-1982. The tracks were selected by the band themselves from their first five albums and also features a short sleeve note written by Jim Kerr. The album cover feature a photo of Kerr taken at a Simple Minds live concert in Munich in August 1980.

== Critical reception ==
Early Gold was generally well received, with many critics positively noting the difference to Simple Minds later material. Reviewing the album for NME, Paul Moody gave it a 7 out of 10 rating, describing the content as "Scarily good". In Uncut it was given a full 5 out of 5 rating.

== Track listing ==
All tracks by Charlie Burchill, Derek Forbes, Jim Kerr, Brian McGee & Mick MacNeil except where noted.

1. "Life in a Day" (Burchill, Kerr) – 4:07
2. "Chelsea Girl" (Burchill, Kerr) – 4:34
3. "Changeling" – 4:12
4. "Factory" – 4:15
5. "Premonition" – 5:30
6. "I Travel" – 4:02
7. "Celebrate" – 5:08
8. "Thirty Frames a Second" – 5:05
9. "The American" – 3:51
10. "Love Song" – 5:04
11. "Sweat in Bullet" – 4:30
12. "Promised You a Miracle" (Burchill, Forbes, Kerr, McNeil) – 4:28
13. "Glittering Prize" (Burchill, Forbes, Kerr, McNeil) – 4:34
14. "Someone Somewhere in Summertime"(Burchill, Forbes, Kerr, McNeil) – 4:35
15. "New Gold Dream" (Burchill, Forbes, Kerr, McNeil) – 5:39

== Personnel ==
- Charlie Burchill – guitar, keyboards
- Derek Forbes – bass guitar
- Jim Kerr – lead vocals
- Brian McGee – drums
- Mick MacNeil – keyboards
