= Celebration (Simple Minds album) =

Compilation album by Simple Minds
- Released: 5 February 1982
- Recorded: 1979–1980
- Genre: Rock
- Label: Arista
- Producer: John Leckie

Simple Minds chronology
Themes for Great Cities 79/81 (1981)	Celebration (1982)	New Gold Dream (81/82/83/84) (1982)

Celebration is a compilation album by Simple Minds, released in 1982. The compilation features tracks from the band's first three albums released during their tenure on the Arista Records label, prior to their move to Virgin Records in 1981. One of the tracks, "Kaleidoscope", was exclusive to this CD and LP until it appeared on the X5 box set in 2012.

Originally released by Arista Records in February 1982, the album spent six weeks on the UK Albums Chart, peaking at number 45 in March 1982. To promote the album, Arista reissued the single "I Travel" which failed to reach the charts.

The album was reissued by Virgin Records later that year after Virgin had acquired the rights to Simple Minds back catalogue. Virgin released it on CD in 1989, mistakenly including the track "Kant-Kino" which was not listed on the sleeve. A 2001 CD release by the Dutch Disky label featured additional artwork.

The back of the cover features a photograph of the band taken at Glasgow Botanic Gardens in 1980.

== Critical reception ==
Professional ratings
Review scores
Source	Rating
AllMusic	4/5 stars
NME	(mixed)
Martin C. Strong	(7/10)

In NME, writer Paul Morley reviewed the album in the form of a letter addressed to Jim Kerr. Morley described the compilation as "a pretty desperate looking" release, "put together with only a very tiny fraction of thought." "Still, the second side helps go some way to underlining why Simple Minds have made such an impression on my life."

== Track listing ==
All lyrics are written by Jim Kerr; all music is composed by Simple Minds, except where noted.

Side one
No.	Title	Music	Length
1.	"Life in a Day" (first single, from Life in a Day, 1979)	Charlie Burchill, Kerr	4:09
2.	"Chelsea Girl" (second single, from Life in a Day)	Burchill, Kerr	4:32
3.	"Premonition" (from Real to Real Cacophony, 1979)		5:27
4.	"Factory" (from Real to Real Cacophony)		4:13
5.	"Calling Your Name" (from Real to Real Cacophony)		5:06

Side two
No.	Title	Length
1.	"I Travel" (fourth single, from Empires and Dance, 1980)	4:00
2.	"Changeling" (third single, from Real to Real Cacophony)	4:10
3.	"Celebrate" (fifth single, from Empires and Dance)	5:01
4.	"Thirty Frames a Second" (from Empires and Dance)	5:03
5.	"Kaleidoscope" ("I Travel" B-side, a Real to Real Cacophony outtake)	4:15

1989 CD edition
No.	Title	Music	Length
1.	"Life in a Day"	Burchill, Kerr	4:06
2.	"Chelsea Girl"	Burchill, Kerr	4:34
3.	"Premonition"		5:30
4.	"Factory"		4:15
5.	"Calling Your Name"		5:07
6.	"I Travel"		4:02
7.	"Changeling"		4:13
8.	"Celebrate"		5:11
9.	"Thirty Frames a Second/Kant-Kino (Note: "Kant-Kino" not credited, appears as a pressing error on the CD issued in 1989.)"		6:55
10.	"Kaleidoscope"		4:17

== Personnel ==
Simple Minds

- Charlie Burchill – guitar, vocals
- Derek Forbes – bass, vocals
- Jim Kerr – vocals
- Mick MacNeil – keyboards, vocals
- Brian McGee – drums, vocals

Technical

- John Leckie – producer
- Thomi Wroblewski – sleeve design, photo illustration

== Chart positions ==
Chart (1982)	Peak position
France SNEP Compilation Albums Chart	162
UK Albums Chart	45
