= Themes for Great Cities 79/81 =

Themes for Great Cities – Definitive Collection 79–81

Compilation album by Simple Minds
- Released: November 1981
- Genre: Rock
- Label: Stiff
- Producer: Steve Hillage

Simple Minds chronology
Sons and Fascination/Sister Feelings Call (1981)	Themes for Great Cities – Definitive Collection 79–81 (1981)	Celebration (1982)

Professional ratings
Review scores
Source	Rating
AllMusic	2.5/5 stars
Robert Christgau	(C−)

Themes for Great Cities – Definitive Collection 79–81 is an American-only compilation album by Simple Minds. It was released in November 1981 by Stiff Records. At the time, the only Simple Minds album released in the US was Life in a Day and this was designed to introduce the American audience to their other albums (which would soon be issued there by Virgin).

== Track listing ==
Side one
No.	Title	Length
1.	"I Travel"	3:56
2.	"Celebrate"	5:09
3.	"In Trance as Mission"	6:51
4.	"Thirty Frames a Second"	5:14

Side two
No.	Title	Length
1.	"Premonition"	5:29
2.	"Sweat in Bullet" (Single Edit Remix)	3:05
3.	"Love Song" (Single Edit)	3:54
4.	"The American"	3:51
5.	"Theme for Great Cities"	5:50

== Personnel ==
- Charles Burchill – guitars
- Derek Forbes – bass
- Brian McGee – drums
- Michael MacNeil – keyboards
- Jim Kerr – vocals
