= 5X5 Live =

Live album by Simple Minds
- Released: 19 November 2012
- Recorded: 16 February–31 July 2012 at various locations in Europe
- Genre: Rock
- Length: 138:53
- Label: Virgin
- Producer: Simple Minds

Simple Minds chronology
Graffiti Soul (2009)	5X5 Live (2012)	Celebrate: The Greatest Hits (2013)

Professional ratings
Review scores
Source	Rating
QRO Magazine	8.5/10 stars
Reflections of Darkness	10/10 stars

5X5 Live is the fourth (double) live album by Scottish rock band Simple Minds, released on 19 November 2012.

== Overview ==
The album is composed of recordings from Simple Minds' "5X5 Live" tour to promote the similarly-named box set. It features five songs from each of the band's first five albums, as well as five bonus tracks.

Sound engineer Olivier Gerard mixed the tracks at Jet Studio, Brussels. The intro "Reel" was mixed by guitarist Charlie Burchilll and consisted of brief snippets of songs from the era, edited together eventually leading into "I Travel" as the band took to the stage. This short piece of music was made available to download for free from the simpleminds.com members section prior to the album's release.

== Release ==
5X5 Live was released in a clamshell box consisting of two CDs, each in card packaging and which reflected artwork similar to that of the 1981 album set Sons and Fascination/Sister Feelings Call. It also features a colour booklet of live and studio images, credits, quotes from the band, a fold out tour poster and a peel-off sticker in the style of a concert ticket.

The album was the middle set of three multi CD reissues/compilations (each incorporating similar styled packaging) that had begun with the 5X5 Box Set itself and ended with the 2013 releases of 6 live shows (6 digipacks / 12 CDs) entitled Celebrate - The Greatest Hits+ Tour 2013.

== Recording ==
The album was recorded at the following locations and venues:

- Razzamatazz, Barcelona, Spain, 16 February 2012,
- Cirque Royal, Brussels, Belgium, 23 February 2012,
- the O2 Academy, Birmingham, England, 24 February 2012,
- Barrowland Ballroom, Glasgow, Scotland, 25 February 2012,
- The Roundhouse, London, England, 2 March 2012,
- Théâtre Antique d'Arles, Arles, France, 21 July 2012,
- Pinède Gould, Antibes Juan-Les-Pins, France, 25 July 2012 and
- Villa Bellini, Catania, Sicily 31 July 2012.

== Track list ==
Disc One
No.	Title	Length
1.	"Reel"	2:14
2.	"I Travel" (from Empires and Dance)	4:53
3.	"Thirty Frames A Second" (from Empires and Dance)	4:25
4.	"Today I Died Again" (from Empires and Dance)	3:31
5.	"Celebrate" (from Empires and Dance)	5:18
6.	"Life In A Day" (from Life in a Day)	3:47
7.	"Calling Your Name" (from Real to Real Cacophony)	5:15
8.	"Scar" (from Real to Real Cacophony)	3:23
9.	"King Is White & In The Crowd" (from New Gold Dream)	4:19
10.	"Hunter & The Hunted" (from New Gold Dream)	5:21
11.	"Wasteland" (from Life in a Day)	3:26
12.	"Love Song" (from Sons and Fascination)	4:42
13.	"This Fear Of Gods" (from Empires and Dance)	5:03
14.	"Pleasantly Disturbed" (from Life in a Day)	6:40
15.	"Room" (from Empires and Dance)	5:22

Disc Two
No.	Title	Length
1.	"The American" (from Sister Feelings Call)	5:02
2.	"70 Cities As Love Brings The Fall" (from Sons and Fascination)	4:40
3.	"In Trance As Mission" (from Sons and Fascination)	4:13
4.	"Sons & Fascination" (from Sons and Fascination)	4:12
5.	"Sweat In Bullet" (from Sons and Fascination)	4:03
6.	"Changeling" (from Real to Real Cacophony)	4:05
7.	"Factory" (from Real to Real Cacophony)	4:39
8.	"Big Sleep" (from New Gold Dream)	4:03
9.	"Premonition" (from Real to Real Cacophony)	5:11
10.	"Promised You A Miracle" (from New Gold Dream)	4:18
11.	"Someone Somewhere In Summertime" (from New Gold Dream)	5:05
12.	"Theme For Great Cities" (from Sister Feelings Call)	4:33
13.	"Glittering Prize" (from New Gold Dream)	4:14
14.	"Someone" (from Life in a Day)	3:57
15.	"Chelsea Girl" (from Life in a Day)	4:03
16.	"New Gold Dream" (from New Gold Dream)	5:13
