= Owen Paul =

Scottish singer

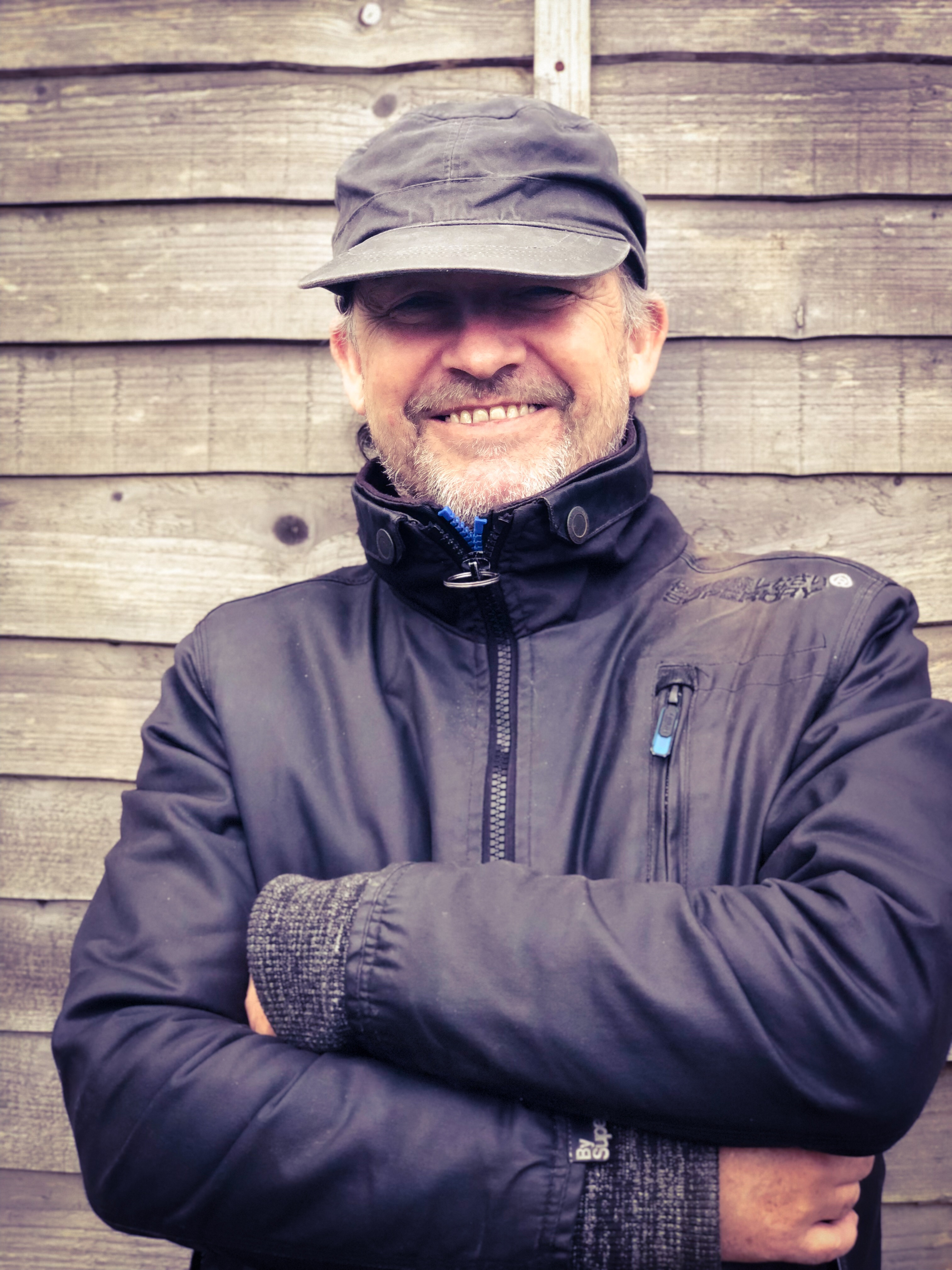
- Paul in 2019

Background information
- Born: Owen McGee; 1 May 1962 (age 64)
- Origin: Glasgow, Scotland
- Genres: Pop rock
- Occupations: Singer; songwriter; musician
- Years active: 1985–present
- Labels: Chrysalis; Right Track
- Website: http://www.theowenpaul.com

Owen Paul (born 1 May 1962) is a Scottish singer best known in the UK for his 1986 No. 3 hit single, "My Favourite Waste of Time", a cover version of a song that was originally written and recorded by American singer-songwriter Marshall Crenshaw. After releasing a couple of singles and the album As It Is, he had a falling-out with his record label, resulting in him leaving the music industry for 15 years.

== Biography ==
As a youngster, Paul was taken on as an apprentice with the football club Celtic, but after hearing the Sex Pistols he decided to pursue a career in music. In the early 1980s he played and sang with Glasgow band Venigmas, who released the single "Strangelove".

In 1989, he produced Japanese rock band Buck-Tick's album Taboo.

Owen Paul has made two memorable television appearances. The first was on the BBC live programme Pebble Mill, when introduced by Marian Foster, he was meant to mime to "My Favourite Waste of Time", but missed his cue due to a technician's mistake. His second appearance was in The Osbournes. when he was the next door neighbour to the Osbourne family. Playing loud music in the middle of the night, leading to the infamous episode of Sharon Osbourne throwing a ham over the fence.

For over ten years he ran a West End theatre in London's Leicester Square (home of the Boy George musical Taboo) as well as a successful ballroom and Latin dancing club, returning to the music scene in 2002 with the album About Time.

After touring and recording with Mike + The Mechanics he had a spell with Scottish supergroup Four Good Men and spent time as the lead vocalist for Ex-Simple Minds, with his brother, former Simple Minds drummer Brian McGee. In late 2012, Paul appeared on BBC1's Watchdog as part of their Rogue Traders team. In January 2014, Paul released "The One", his first official single in the UK since 1987, following this with the release of the album About Time II in the autumn of the same year.

He now tours as a solo artist, with his 1980s band and with his Acoustic Folk show.

To celebrate the 30th Anniversary of his 1986 hit he released two new versions, "My Favourite Waste of Time Part One" and "My Favourite Waste of Time Part Two", along with various dance remixes. The Acoustic 80s EP was released in 2017.

The dance version of "Amazing" was remixed by Stonebridge and spent 3 weeks in the Music Week Club Charts in 2018.

"Sleeping on the Same Pillow" (featuring Lynne Johnstone) – released in January 2020 – was the first release from his forthcoming Americana/country album Overblown Superstar which is due for release in 2023 and sees a return to his Celtic/folk roots. "Beauty of the Sun" – recorded entirely during COVID-19 lockdown reached number one in the Heritage Chart.

He released a jam based on the chorus of "My Favourite Waste of Time" featuring Glen Matlock (Sex Pistols), Toyah, Carol Decker (T'pau), comedian Matt Lucas, Leee John (Imagination), Cheryl Baker (The Fizz), Celtic folk musicians Phil Cunningham and John McCusker, Mick MacNeil from Simple Minds, Ezio, Bruce Watson from Big Country, members of The Alarm, and many more. Each guest improvised, recorded and filmed their parts remotely from their own lockdown situations.

His first Christmas song "This Christmas" reached the Heritage Chart top ten in December 2020, and was followed by the singles "Sparkle in the Rain", the 35th anniversary version of "My Favourite Waste of Time" and "September" which got to number two in November 2021. A brand new version of "A Different Corner" was released in June 2022 to commemorate George Michael's birthday and reached number one in the Heritage Chart.

== Discography ==
=== Albums ===
- 1986: As It Is
- 2002: About Time
- 2004: Rewired – Mike + the Mechanics (as backing vocalist and vocal arranger)
- 2014: About Time II
- 2017: Acoustic 80s EP

=== Singles ===
| Year | Song | UK | Certifications |
|---|---|---|---|
| 1986 | "My Favourite Waste of Time" | 3 | BPI: Silver |
| 1986 | "Pleased to Meet You" | 78 | |
| 1986 | "One World" | 87 | |
| 1987 | "Mad About the Girl" | 92 | |
| 1987 | "Bring Me Back That Spark" | 158 | |
| 2014 | "The One" | — | |
| 2017 | "A Different Corner" (for Childline) | — | |
| 2018 | "Amazing" (Stonebridge Radio Edit) | — | |
| 2020 | "Sleeping on the Same Pillow" (featuring Lynne Johnstone) | — | |
| 2020 | "You Lucky Thing" | — | |
| 2020 | "Beauty of the Sun" | — | |
| 2020 | "My Favourite Waste of Time - The Lockdown Chorus" (credited as Owen Paul & Friends) | — | |
| 2020 | "This Christmas" | — | |
| 2021 | "Sparkle in the Rain" | — | |
| 2021 | "My Favourite Waste of Time" (35th anniversary version) | — | |
| 2021 | "September" | — | |
| 2022 | "Breathe in Breathing Deep" (Song for John) | — | |
| 2022 | "A Different Corner" (from the album Rediscovered 80s) | — | |
"—" denotes releases that did not chart.
