= Ex-Simple Minds =

Scottish musical group

XSM (Ex-Simple Minds)
- Origin: Glasgow, Scotland
- Genres: Rock, new wave, post-punk
- Years active: 2009–present
- Members: Brian McGee; Owen Paul; Joe O'Neill; Gary Irvine; Anthony William
- Past members: Derek Forbes; George Porter; Eddie Beggan
- Website: www.exsimplemind.com

Ex-Simple Minds (or XSM) are a Scottish new wave/rock band, formed in 2009 by Derek Forbes and Brian McGee, both former members of the new wave bands Simple Minds and Propaganda. The band's original lead singer was McGee's younger brother, Owen Paul, but due to other commitments, Paul left the band and was replaced by singer George Porter in 2011. When Porter left the band, Paul briefly returned then was replaced by Eddie Beggan in June 2012. Derek Forbes left XSM to join Big Country in 2012 and performed his last gig in Spain in 2013.

== Formation ==
After a successful career as two of the original members of Scottish band Simple Minds, ex-members Derek Forbes and Brian McGee formed the partnership they shared in the 1980s, this time under the name XSM (Ex-Simple Minds). Throughout their tenure, the band have performed shows across the UK and in Europe, performing classic hit songs of Simple Minds, as well as live covers. In September 2011, a concert was held in Manila, Philippines together with English new wave band China Crisis.

== Discography ==
=== Singles ===
- "The American" (2010)
- "Outsider" (2012)
