= Big Music (Simple Minds album) =

Studio album by Simple Minds
- Released: 31 October 2014
- Recorded: May 2009 – August 2014
- Venues: London, Bath, Ireland
- Genres: Pop rock, synth-pop
- Length: 51:44
- Labels: Caroline International/Universal, Sony Music
- Producers: Gavin Goldberg, Steve Osborne, Owen Parker, Simple Minds, Andy Wright

Simple Minds chronology
Celebrate: The Greatest Hits (2013)	Big Music (2014)	Live – Big Music Tour 2015 (2015)

Simple Minds studio albums chronology
Graffiti Soul (2009)	Big Music (2014)	Acoustic (2016)

Singles from Big Music
- 1. "Honest Town" Released: 10 October 2014; 2. "Let the Day Begin" Released: 13 December 2014; 3. "Midnight Walking" Released: 9 February 2015

Professional ratings
Aggregate scores
Source	Rating
Metacritic	75/100
Review scores
Source	Rating
Allmusic	4/5 stars
The Daily Telegraph	3/5 stars
The Guardian	3/5 stars
Hot Press	"HotPress"
The Irish Times	2/5 stars
London Evening Standard	4/5 stars
musicOMH	4/5 stars
Record Collector	4/5 stars
Shields Gazette	7/10
The Yorkshire Times	4/5
MOJO magazine	4/4 stars

Big Music is the sixteenth studio album by Scottish rock band Simple Minds. It was released on 31 October 2014 by Sony Music. "Honest Town" was released as the lead single on 10 October 2014. The album was available to stream from 28 October 2014.

== Background ==
During the recording of Simple Minds previous studio album Graffiti Soul, Jim Kerr stated: "We really are flowing with ideas at the moment and [...] I do feel that we are possibly writing two albums simultaneously at present." Several tracks were omitted from Graffiti Soul so that the album had more focus. Possible candidates include "Six Degrees Of Separation", "Lotus Effect" and "Shaman".

According to Simple Minds lead singer Jim Kerr, Big Music has much power and passion, urgency and momentum, adding "it is energetic, it's got a raw power and a lot of vitality".

== Recording ==
Demoing of tracks for the album began in 2009. In September 2010, the first recording sessions for the album started in London with producer Andy Wright. In 2011, recording sessions with producer Steve Hillage took place in London. Further sessions in 2012 and 2013 were divided between studios in London with Andy Wright (Jim and Charlie), studios in Bath with producer Steve Osborne (Jim and Charlie) and studios in Ireland (with the whole band) during which a total of seventeen new songs were recorded. The album was completed with a final recording on 27 August 2014.

== Release and promotion ==
The album's release campaign started on 4 September 2014 with "Blindfolded" being issued as a video teaser (not as a single). The album's logo was revealed on 4 September 2014.

On 23 September 2014, Simple Minds announced that Jim and Charlie would be special guests of The Chris Evans Breakfast Show on Friday morning 26 September 2014 where they'd be performing 4 tracks acoustically for the first time ever.

Previously announced for October 2014, the album was released on the 31 October 2014 in Austria, Belgium, Germany, Ireland, Netherlands, Norway, South Africa and Switzerland and on 3 November 2014 in other territories.

The album was released on Caroline Records in the UK and Ireland, the Embassy Of Music in Germany and by Sony (licensed from Embassy Of Music) in other European territories.

== Singles ==
The title song "Big Music" was intended to be the first single but the idea was later dropped. On 23 September 2014, Simple Minds announced that the first play of their new single "Honest Town" would have its worldwide premiere the following morning on the Ken Bruce Show on BBC Radio 2. "Honest Town" was released as the lead single on 10 October 2014.

== Critical reception ==
Big Music received generally positive reviews from music critics. In the review aggregator website Metacritic (which assigns a "Metascore" based on the ratings and reviews of selected mainstream independent publications), the album has a score of a 75 out of 100 based on 12 reviews, indicating "generally favorable reviews". AllMusic, Mojo and musicOMH deemed it Simple Minds best album in decades. Q concluded that "Big Music's bold title matches the bold music within". The Guardian rated the album three stars out of five, commenting that "the band have managed to craft an album of pop that’s both true to their sound and interesting enough to give it a contemporary edge." Record Collector's Daryl Easlea positively found that "Big Music embraces their past and looks resolutely to the future (...) This is the first new Simple Minds album in recent memory that you'll want keep returning to." While The Irish Times contrary found that "this is old ground sorely in need of much stronger foundations". An unfavourable review also appeared in Classic Rock Magazine: "Too much of Big Music seems to be reaching for a gravitas it can't back up with emotional or musical substance."

== Commercial performance ==
In the United Kingdom, Big Music debuted at number 12 on the UK Albums Chart. The album sold 10,207 copies in its first week, and became the group's 17th top 75 album.

== Track listing ==
Standard edition
No.	Title	Writer(s)	Producer(s)	Length
1.	"Blindfolded"	Jim Kerr, Charlie Burchill	Steve Osborne, Simple Minds, Andy Wright^{[a]}, Gavin Goldberg^{[a]}	5:23
2.	"Midnight Walking"	Kerr, Burchill, Andy Gillespie	Wright, Goldberg, Simple Minds	3:54
3.	"Honest Town"	Iain Cook, Kerr, Burchill	Wright, Goldberg, Simple Minds	4:46
4.	"Big Music"	Kerr, Burchill, Gillespie	Wright, Goldberg, Simple Minds	4:12
5.	"Human"	Kerr, Burchill	Wright, Goldberg, Simple Minds	3:42
6.	"Blood Diamonds"	Cook, Kerr, Burchill	Wright, Goldberg, Simple Minds	4:21
7.	"Let the Day Begin"	Michael Been	Wright, Goldberg, Simple Minds	5:10
8.	"Concrete and Cherry Blossom"	Kerr, Burchill	Wright, Goldberg, Simple Minds	3:33
9.	"Imagination"	Kerr, Burchill	Wright, Goldberg, Simple Minds	3:42
10.	"Kill or Cure"	Paul Statham, Kerr, Burchill	Wright, Goldberg, Simple Minds	4:12
11.	"Broken Glass Park"	Owen Parker, Kerr, Burchill	Wright, Goldberg, Simple Minds	4:41
12.	"Spirited Away"	Parker, Kerr, Burchill	Wright, Goldberg, Simple Minds, Parker^{[b]}	4:08

Deluxe edition – Disc 2
No.	Title	Writer(s)	Producer(s)	Length
13.	"Swimming Towards the Sun"	Kevin Hunter, Kathleen Stevenson	Wright, Goldberg, Simple Minds	5:16
14.	"Bittersweet"	Kerr, Burchill	Wright, Goldberg, Simple Minds	3:58
15.	"Liaison"	Kerr, Burchill	Wright, Goldberg, Simple Minds	4:37
16.	"Riders on the Storm"	Jim Morrison, Robby Krieger, Ray Manzarek, John Densmore	Wright, Goldberg, Simple Minds	3:46
17.	"Dancing Barefoot"	Patti Smith, Ivan Kral, Lenny Kaye, Richard Sohl, Jay Dee Daugherty	Wright, Goldberg, Simple Minds	4:02
18.	"Blindfolded" (reprise)	Kerr, Burchill	Wright, Goldberg, Simple Minds	4:23

Deluxe edition – iTunes Store bonus tracks
No.	Title	Length
19.	"Blindfolded" (video)	5:23
20.	"Honest Town" (video)	4:44
21.	"Album Interview" (video)	22:24

Deluxe edition – DVD
No.	Title	Length
1.	"Honest Town" (video)
2.	"Blindfolded" (video)
3.	"Let the Day Begin" (clip)
4.	"Human" (clip)
5.	"Midnight Walking" (clip)
6.	"Behind the Scenes"
7.	"Band Interviews"

Editions

- Double vinyl edition as a heavyweight black vinyl in wide spine sleeve with printed inner sleeves.
- Limited edition deluxe box-set also including the original album, a DVD, and a poster and booklet in foil-blocked box.

Notes

- ^{^[a]} signifies an additional producer
- ^{^[b]} signifies original production

== Personnel ==
Adapted from album liner notes.

=== Simple Minds ===
- Jim Kerr – vocals
- Charlie Burchill – guitar, keyboard, programming
- Mel Gaynor – drums

=== Additional musicians ===
- Andy Gillespie – keyboard, backing vocals
- Ged Grimes – bass guitar
- Sarah Brown – backing vocals
- Clinton Outten – backing vocals

=== Production ===
- Steve Osborne – producer, programming
- Simple Minds – producer
- Gavin Goldberg – producer, mixer, programming, keyboard, acoustic guitar
- Andy Wright – producer, programming, keyboard
- Owen Parker – original production, backing vocals, additional guitar, additional programming
- Iain Cook – additional programming
- Paul Statham – additional programming
- Tom Dalgety – additional engineering
- John Henry – additional engineering
- Lewis Chapman – assistant mixer
- JP Chalbos – mastering
- Peacock – art direction, design
- Daniel Reed – cover digital illustration
- Paul Cox – photography
- Martin Smith – photography

== Live performances ==
Most of the songs have been played live by Simple Minds:

- "Broken Glass Park": during the 2011 "Greatest Hits Forest Tour", at the unique 2011 show in Australia, during the "Greatest Hits + 2013", the "Greatest Hits + 2014" tour & the "Big Music Tour + Greatest Hits 2015" tour.
- "Blood Diamonds" and "Let the Day Begin": during the "Greatest Hits + 2013" & the "Greatest Hits + 2014" tour.
- "Imagination": only during the "Greatest Hits + 2014" tour.
- "Blindfolded" and "Big Music": during the "Greatest Hits + 2014" tour & the "Big Music Tour + Greatest Hits 2015" tour. Prior to the "Greatest Hits + 2014" tour, "Big Music" was only played once: on 27 November 2013 at the Hydro, Glasgow, UK as the song inaugural live performance.
- "Honest Town": during the "Greatest Hits + 2014" tour (only soundchecked) & the "Big Music Tour + Greatest Hits 2015" tour.
- "Midnight Walking": during the "Big Music Tour + Greatest Hits 2015" tour, the 2018 "Walk Between Worlds Tour" and the 2025 "Alive and Kicking Tour".
- "Spirited Away" and "Riders On The Storm": only during the "Big Music Tour + Greatest Hits 2015" tour.

== Live debuts ==
=== by Lostboy! AKA ===
"Broken Glass Park": on 18 May 2010 at ABC2, Glasgow, UK.

"Kill Or Cure?": on 18 October 2010 at Handelsbeurs Concertzaal, Ghent, Belgium.

=== by Simple Minds ===
"Fire Fighter": on 18 June 2010 at Le Bataclan, Paris, France (just after another live debut, "Stagefright", played as the opener). "Concrete And Cherry Blossom" was planned to be debuted as part of the encore of the Bataclan show but dropped due to time constraints.

"Broken Glass Park": on 11 June 2011 at Thetford Forest (near Brandon), Suffolk, UK.

"Blood Diamonds": on 25 March 2013 at Olympia, Dublin, Ireland.

"Big Music": on 27 November 2013 at The Hydro, Glasgow, UK.

"Honest Town" and "Machines": soundchecked in April 2014 at the private ElectroSet gig at Annabel's, London, UK.

"Imagination" and "Blindfolded": on 6 June 2014 at the "Montereau Confluences" Festival, Montereau-Fault-Yonne, France.

== Covers and new versions ==
- "Riders on the Storm" is a cover of the 1971 song by The Doors.
- "Dancing Barefoot" is a cover of the 1979 song by Patti Smith. A previous Simple Minds recording was released in October 2001 on their cover album Neon Lights. This new recording features a different arrangement with Sarah Brown on lead vocals.
- "Let the Day Begin" is a cover of the 1989 song by The Call. An earlier Simple Minds recording was released in May 2009 on the Graffiti Soul bonus (cover) album Searching For The Lost Boys. This new recording features a different arrangement.
- "Swimming Towards the Sun" was originally recorded in 1999 and released in October 2004 on Our Secrets Are the Same. This new recording features a different arrangement.
- "Blood Diamonds" and "Broken Glass Park" were originally released (in different versions) in March 2013 on Celebrate: The Greatest Hits.

== Songs intended for the album ==
1. "Blindfolded" (first mentioned as a demo composed by Charlie in March 2011)
2. "Big Music" (original riff developed during the 2004–2005 Black & White 050505 sessions without lyric to match the music; Jim Kerr, Charlie Burchill and Andy Gillespie fused song and lyrics to the instrumental in late 2013 at Grouse Lodge, Ireland; about "Big Music", Charlie Burchill stated: «this track had been around for a long time but we couldn't really make it work. After re-visiting it, we went loud and proud on it with it becoming the album title track.»)
3. "Broken Glass Park" [Band Version] (written as a Lostboy! AKA song on 11 May 2010 during the rehearsals for the first "Lostboy! AKA" promo tour, performed live on the first night on 18 May 2010 in Glasgow, UK, initially scheduled for the aborted second Lostboy! AKA album entitled The Return Of The Lostboy! but ultimately recorded by Simple Minds; released on the Celebrate: The Greatest Hits compilation in March 2013; final mix completed on 30 September 2010 in London, UK)
4. "Blood Diamonds" [Band Version] (originally written by Jim Kerr with Iain Cook (of Chvrches) after an introduction by Martin Hanlin; intended to be part of the aborted second Lostboy! AKA album until Charlie Burchill and Steve Osborne felt it was better suited for Simple Minds; released on the Celebrate: The Greatest Hits compilation in March 2013; new version later re-recorded following the 2013 Greatest Hits+ Tour)
5. "Chrome Heart" (worked in the studio on 6 April 2012 with Simon Hayward)
6. "Concrete And Cherry Blossom" (demo worked in May 2009 which later evolved into "On The Rooftop")
7. "Fire Fighter" (first demoed by Charlie Burchill and Jim Kerr in May 2009)
8. "Harmonize" (based on an idea that came out of recordings made in Sicily over a decade prior to April 2012 when it was ultimately rediscovered)
9. "Human" (first mentioned by Jim Kerr on 17 February 2014 as being due to start featuring in the live set but never played live to date yet; intended to start featuring in the live set for the Simple Minds planned summer shows of 2014 but ultimately not played)
10. "Human Trafficking" (written in Hamburg during Summer 2009, first mentioned by Jim Kerr in February 2010, "not to be finished quite yet" as Jim Kerr stated on 25 November 2010)
11. "Honest Town" (originally written by Iain Cook (of Chvrches) for the aborted second Lostboy! AKA album but later demoed and worked for Big Music in late May 2012 in Real World Studios)
12. "Imagination" (originally a demo instrumental called "Odyssey" composed by Charlie Burchill)
13. "In Every Heaven" [2010 Recording] (first recorded by Simple Minds in May 1982, this is the "lost" track from the New Gold Dream (81/82/83/84) sessions; finally recorded by Simple Minds in 2010 as an eight-minute epic initially planned to be released in May 2011 on the abandoned Greatest Hits + (3CD) compilation without actually having been included in the Celebrate: The Greatest Hits compilation released in March 2013)
14. "Kill Or Cure?" (originally a new Lostboy! AKA song with music composed by Paul Statham and lyrics written by Jim Kerr, intended for the aborted second Lostboy! AKA album, demoed in February 2009, later remixed by Simon Hayward starting from the August 2010 Lostboy! AKA Electroset Radio Tour; the Electroset rehearsal demo received its radio debut on the Clyde 2 Billy Sloan show of 17 October 2010; the song has since been recorded by Simple Minds)
15. "Let The Day Begin" (Simple Minds cover of The Call's 1989 hit song composed by Michael Been; this song was premiered on the Billy Sloan show on 29 March 2009)
16. "Liaison" (Jim Kerr (lyrics), Charlie Burchill (music); demoed by Charlie Burchill in late April 2011; recording completed in London at the start of September 2011 with Steve Hillage producing)
17. "Love's Bonfire" (idea of the song developed by Jim Kerr during a rest in April 2012 in Taormina, Sicily)
18. "Machines" (written by Simon Hayward)
19. "Midnight Walking" (written (in late March 2012 in Tromsø, Norway) by Jim Kerr and composed by Andy Gillespie; mentioned by Jim Kerr during his interview with Todd Richards for "Some Sweet Day 2013" after the announcement of Celebrate: The Greatest Hits; recognised as a potential lead single for Big Music; intended to start featuring in the live set for the Simple Minds planned summer shows of 2014 but ultimately not played)
20. "On The Rooftop" (Jim Kerr (lyrics), Andy Gillespie (music); demoed for Big Music; album version recorded in September 2010 at the Sphere Recording Studios, London, UK; believed to be a reworking of the "Concrete And Cherry Blossom" demo)
21. "Photograph" (composed by Andy Gillespie; demoed for Big Music)
22. "Planet Zero" (Jim Kerr (lyrics), Charlie Burchill (music); described by Jim Kerr as «an insanely catchy and thundering "space-rock" track with music written by Charlie Burchill and featuring arguably one of his best ever guitar melodies», a song «that conjures up Prince set to the background of Hawkwind» and «sounds like pure Simple Minds, albeit remade and remodelled»; recording started in late August 2011 during the "Greatest Hits +" Europe Tour and completed in London at the start of September 2011 with Steve Hillage producing)
23. "Space" [New Version] (Jim Kerr (lyrics), Charlie Burchill (music), Kevin Hunter (music & lyrics); primarily a Kevin Hunter song and one of the centrepieces of 1999/2000 Our Secrets Are the Same; after the UK leg of the "Greatest Hits+ 2013" Tour, Simple Minds returned to the recording studio and re-recorded a "band" version of the song at Grouse Lodge (Ireland))
24. "Spirited Away" (one of several new songs which was prepared for the (October 2010) UK leg of the Lostboy! Electroset Tour 2010; intended to start featuring in the live set for the Simple Minds planned summer shows of 2014 but ultimately not played)
25. "Signal And The Noise" (Owen Parker (music), Jim Kerr (lyrics); Jim Kerr started writing lyrics for this Owen Parker's piece of music in the morning of 17 November 2013)
26. "Swimming Towards The Sun" (New Version) (written in 1995 by Kevin Hunter and Anusha Solayea (K Stevens); demo featuring instrumentation by Kevin Hunter with Anusha Solayea singing the vocals; recorded in 1999 by Simple Minds themselves for (and released on) Our Secrets Are the Same; after the UK leg of the "Greatest Hits+ 2013" Tour, Simple Minds returned to the recording studio and re-recorded a "band" version of the song at Grouse Lodge (Ireland))
27. "Tsunami" (Iain Cook (music), Jim Kerr (lyrics); demoed for Big Music; Jim Kerr worked on this new tune on 30 November and 1 December 2010, shortly after having postponed (on 13 November 2010) the Lostboy! AKA Electroset Tour 2010)
28. "Ulysses" (first demoed by Charlie Burchill and Jim Kerr on May 2009)
29. "Utopia" (mentioned by Jim Kerr in June 2012)
30. "War Babies" [New Version] (Jim Kerr (lyrics), Charlie Burchill (music); after the UK leg of the "Greatest Hits+ 2013" Tour, Simple Minds returned to the recording studio and re-recorded a "band" version of the song at Grouse Lodge (Ireland))

== Charts ==
=== Weekly charts ===
Chart (2014)	Peak position
Belgian Albums (Ultratop Flanders)	11
Belgian Albums (Ultratop Wallonia)	11
Dutch Albums (Album Top 100)	22
French Albums (SNEP)	69
German Albums (Offizielle Top 100)	16
Irish Albums (IRMA)	28
Italian Albums (FIMI)	17
Scottish Albums (Official Charts)	9
Swiss Albums (Schweizer Hitparade)	20
UK Albums (Official Charts)	12

=== Year-end charts ===
Chart (2014)	Position
Belgian Albums (Ultratop Flanders)	120
Belgian Albums (Ultratop Wallonia)	117

== Sources ==
- Official Simple Minds web site
- Dream Giver Redux
