= Mel Gaynor =

British drummer and singer (born 1959)

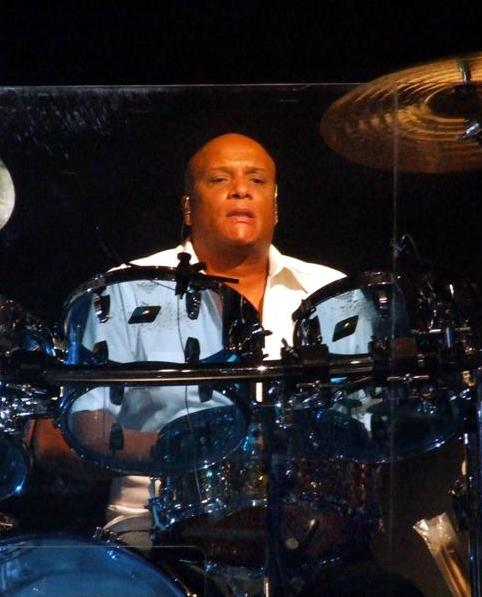
- Gaynor performing in 2006

Background information
- Born: Mel George Gaynor; 29 May 1959 (age 67); Balham, London, England
- Genres: Art rock; synth-pop; new wave; heavy metal
- Occupation: Drummer
- Years active: 1981–present
- Member of: Mel Gaynor Band
- Formerly of: Samson, Simple Minds
- Website: melgaynor.com

Mel George Gaynor (born 29 May 1959) is an English drummer, singer and recording artist, best known as the longtime drummer for the rock band Simple Minds.

== Career ==
Prior to joining Simple Minds, Gaynor played in the hard rock band Samson, at the same time as vocalist Bruce Dickinson. In 1981, he appeared in the music video for David Bowie's "Wild Is the Wind".

Gaynor first worked with Simple Minds in 1982 as a session drummer for the New Gold Dream album, playing on six of the nine tracks. He joined the band permanently later that year, after drummer Mike Ogletree was fired partway through the New Gold Dream tour. Gaynor's last work with Simple Minds was the recording of the Walk Between Worlds album during 2017.

Gaynor's solo album, Come With Me, was released as a digital copy in May 2024, with a physical copy planned for release in June 2024. He started a tour in the autumn of 2024.

== Discography ==
with Samson

- Live at Reading '81 (1990)

with Simple Minds

- New Gold Dream (81/82/83/84) (1982)
- Sparkle in the Rain (1984)
- Once Upon a Time (1985)
- Live in the City of Light (1987)
- Street Fighting Years (1989)
- Real Life (1991)
- Néapolis (1998)
- Black & White 050505 (2005)
- Graffiti Soul (2009)
- 5X5 Live (2012)
- Big Music (2014)
- Walk Between Worlds (2018)

Solo

- Come with Me (2024)
