= Graffiti Soul =

Studio album by Simple Minds
- Released: 25 May 2009
- Recorded: August – October 2008
- Studio: Rockfield Studios, Rockfield, Monmouthshire, Wales; The Honey Factory, Greenwich, England; LOFI Studios, Glasgow, Scotland; The Engine Room, London, England
- Genre: Pop rock, synth-pop
- Length: 42:52
- Label: The Universal Music Record Label
- Producer: Jez Coad, Simple Minds

Simple Minds chronology
Themes – Volume 5: March 91 – September 92 (2008)	Graffiti Soul (2009)	5x5 Live (2012)

Simple Minds studio albums chronology
Black & White 050505 (2005)	Graffiti Soul (2009)	Big Music (2014)

Singles from Graffiti Soul
- 1. "Rockets" Released: 18 May 2009; 2. "Stars Will Lead the Way" Released: 20 July 2009; 3. "This Is It" Released: 2009

Professional ratings
Aggregate scores
Source	Rating
Metacritic	(58/100)
Review scores
Source	Rating
Allmusic	3.5/5 stars
Contactmusic.com	(favourable)
Mojo	4/5 stars
NME	(5/10)
PopMatters	(5/10)
Q	3/5 stars
The Quietus	(favourable)
Record Collector	3/5 stars
Daily Telegraph	3/5 stars
The Times	2/5 stars

Graffiti Soul is the fifteenth studio album (of original material) by Scottish rock band Simple Minds, released in May 2009. On 31 May 2009, the album entered the UK Albums Chart at No. 10, becoming Simple Minds' first UK top ten album in 14 years, since the release of their 1995 album Good News from the Next World. In early April 2009, the video for the single "Rockets" was made available via the band's official website.

== Overview ==
Graffiti Soul was released on 25 May 2009 and continued Simple Minds' return to the top, charting at #10. During the recording of Graffiti Soul, Jim Kerr stated: "We really are flowing with ideas at the moment and [...] I do feel that we are possibly writing two albums simultaneously at present." Several tracks were omitted from Graffiti Soul so that the album had more focus. Possible candidates include "Six Degrees Of Separation", "Lotus Effect" and "Shaman".

At the time of the album release, Charlie Burchill stated about the new album: "We would create ideas and work on those ideas for hours. That's the way we worked upon Graffiti Soul's tracks; we worked upon ideas and just let them evolve over long periods of time."

== Recording ==
An e-mail announcement by Simple Minds stated that Graffiti Soul was initially written on location in Rome (Italy), Sicily, Antwerp (Belgium) and Glasgow (Scotland). The band then returned for the first time in almost three decades to Rockfield Studios, near Monmouth in Wales, where the group originally recorded their earlier albums Real to Real Cacophony, Empires and Dance and New Gold Dream. The album was mixed in Los Angeles by Bob Clearmountain.

== Release ==
Graffiti Soul is also available as a vinyl LP and a 2-CD deluxe edition, both including a second album called Searching for the Lost Boys, actually a covers studio album made up of songs by Neil Young, Massive Attack, Magazine, The Stranglers, Thin Lizzy, Siouxsie and the Banshees, The Call and The Beach Boys.

== Critical reception ==
The album received generally mixed reviews upon release. Metacritic gives it a score of 58 out of 100 based on 5 critics, indicating "mixed or average reviews".

The NME's John Doran was underwhelmed, describing it as: "easily the best thing they've done since the mid-’80s...but it's still not enough. If Simple Minds had stopped the second "Don't You (Forget About Me)" was released then they’d still be remembered as a truly great band. As it is, this is not enough on its own to restore their tarnished reputation." In The Telegraph, Thomas H. Green noted the album's production as being: "polished to a US radio-friendly sheen", whilst offering that the album is, "not a sudden, flawless comeback, by any means, but for fans who've been waiting for Simple Minds to relocate their previous form, Graffiti Soul is well worth a listen."

== Track listing ==
=== Standard edition ===
No.	Title	Writer(s)	Length
1.	"Moscow Underground"	Jim Kerr, Charlie Burchill	5:01
2.	"Rockets"	Kerr, Burchill, Gordy Goudie	4:36
3.	"Stars Will Lead the Way"	Kerr, Burchill	3:26
4.	"Light Travels"	Kerr, Burchill, Jez Coad, Sean Kelly	4:12
5.	"Kiss and Fly"	Kerr, Burchill, Andy Gillespie	5:01
6.	"Graffiti Soul"	Kerr, Burchill, Gillespie	4:48
7.	"Blood Type O"	Kerr, Burchill, Coad	3:49
8.	"This Is It"	Kerr, Burchill	4:55

=== Deluxe Edition bonus tracks ===
No.	Title	Writer(s)	Length
9.	"Shadows and Light"	Kerr, Burchill	2:56
10.	"Rockin' in the Free World"	Neil Young	4:17

=== Vinyl LP / 2-CD Deluxe Editions ===
No.	Title	Writer(s)	Original artist	Length
1.	"Rockin' in the Free World"	Young	Neil Young	4:17
2.	"A Song from Under the Floorboards"	Howard Devoto, Barry Adamson, John Doyle, Dave Formula, John McGeoch	Magazine	4:39
3.	"Christine"	Siouxsie Sioux, Steven Severin	Siouxsie and the Banshees	3:13
4.	"(Get A) Grip (On Yourself)"	Hugh Cornwell, Jean Jacques Burnel, Dave Greenfield, Jet Black	The Stranglers	3:53
5.	"Let the Day Begin"	Michael Been	The Call	3:02
6.	"Peace, Love and Understanding"	Nick Lowe	Brinsley Schwarz	3:34
7.	"Teardrop"	Robert Del Naja, Elizabeth Fraser, Grantley Marshall, Andrew Vowles	Massive Attack	5:33
8.	"Whiskey in the Jar"	Traditional	Thin Lizzy	4:00
9.	"Sloop John B"	Traditional	The Beach Boys	4:35

== Personnel ==
Simple Minds

- Jim Kerr – vocals
- Charlie Burchill – guitars, keyboards
- Mel Gaynor – drums

Additional musicians

- Eddie Duffy – bass
- Gordy Goudie – guitar and keyboards (2), backing vocals (1–3, 5–8)
- Jez Coad – backing vocals (1–3, 5–8), timpani (3), additional keyboards (4, 5, 7), additional drums (4)
- Katie Kissoon – backing vocals (2–6, 8)
- Sonia Jones – backing vocals (2–6, 8)
- Tom Hooper – percussion (3, 5–8)
- Andy Gillespie – additional keyboards (5)

Technical

- Jez Coad – producer, mixing (7, 9)
- Simple Minds – producer
- Arjen Mesinga – engineer
- Simon Dawson – engineer
- Mark Bishop – engineer
- Ben Cunningham – assistant engineer
- Gordy Goudie – additional pre-production
- Andy Gillespie – additional pre-production
- Kevin Burleigh – additional pre-production
- Bob Clearmountain – mixing (1–6, 8, 10)
- Brandon Duncan – mixing assistant (1–6, 8, 10)
- Bob Ludwig – mastering
- Joe Blake – design
- Chris Gallagher– design
- Ryan MacDonald – design
- Mark Seager – photography
- Sven Hoogerhuis – photography
- Hilko Nackaerts – photography

== Left-overs ==
At least, four other tracks, "Six Degrees of Separation", "Lotus Effect", "Shaman" and "Angel Under My Skin" were demoed for Graffiti Soul. Originally written by Mark Kerr and Erikah Karst during the Cry period (2002), "Angel Under My Skin" was previously worked on for Black & White 050505 (2005) before the song was finally recorded and released as a Deluxe edition bonus track on Walk Between Worlds (2018).

== Live performances ==
Many of the songs have been played live:

- "Moscow Underground", "Rockets" and "Stars Will Lead the Way": during the 2009 "30 Years Live European", 2009 "Graffiti Soul", 2010 "Australian", 2010 "Festival Show" and 2010 "Final Shows" tours.
- "Moscow Underground": also during the 2011 "Greatest Hits Forest", 2011 "Greatest Hits +", 2012 "Festival", 2012 "Australia" tours and at the 2011 "Australia" "600 Sounds" Festival show.
- "Stars Will Lead the Way": also during the 2011 "Greatest Hits +" and 2012 "Festival" tours.
- "Light Travels": only one time as an encore (in Rome, Italy) and another time as a soundcheck (in Ancona, Italy) during the 2009 "Graffiti Soul" tour.
- "Kiss and Fly": only one time as a soundcheck (in Birmingham, UK) during the 2009 "Graffiti Soul" tour.
- "Graffiti Soul": during the 2009 "Graffiti Soul" and 2010 "Festival Show" tours.
- "This Is It": during the 2009 "30 Years Live European", 2009 "Graffiti Soul", 2010 "Festival Show" and 2010 "Final Shows" tours.
- "Rockin' In The Free World": only one time as a spontaneous improvisation launched by Jim during the 2009 "30 Years Live European" tour and another time as a soundcheck (in Birmingham, UK) during the 2009 "Graffiti Soul" tour.
- "Teardrop" only four times: (as an encore) during the Lostboy! AKA's 2010 "Electroset Radio" tour and only one time (as an encore) during the Lostboy! AKA's 2010 "Electroset" tour.
- "Whiskey In The Jar": only one time (in Cork, Ireland) during the 2009 "30 Years Live European" tour.

== Charts ==
=== Weekly charts ===
Chart (2009)	Peak position
Austrian Albums (Ö3 Austria)	60
Belgian Albums (Ultratop Flanders)	9
Belgian Albums (Ultratop Wallonia)	11
Dutch Albums (Album Top 100)	29
French Albums (SNEP)	41
German Albums (Offizielle Top 100)	14
Irish Albums (IRMA)	50
Italian Albums (FIMI)	11
Scottish Albums (OCC)	4
Spanish Albums (Promusicae)	58
Swiss Albums (Schweizer Hitparade)	8
UK Albums (OCC)	10

=== Year-end charts ===
Chart (2009)	Position
Belgian Albums (Ultratop Wallonia)	79

== Sources ==
- Official Simple Minds web site
- Dream Giver Redux
