= Love Song (Simple Minds song) =

1981 single by Simple Minds

Single by Simple Minds

from the album Sons and Fascination
- B-side: "This Earth That You Walk Upon" (instrumental version)
- Released: 7 August 1981
- Recorded: July 1981
- Genre: Electronic rock; electro funk; disco
- Length: 5:04 (album version); 3:51 (single edit); 4:14 (1992 remixed version)
- Label: Virgin
- Songwriters: Jim Kerr; Charlie Burchill; Derek Forbes; Brian McGee; Mick MacNeil

Simple Minds singles chronology
"The American" (1981)	"Love Song" (1981)	"Sweat in Bullet" (1981)

"Love Song" is the seventh single released by Scottish band Simple Minds. It was issued by Virgin Records in August 1981, one month before the release of its parent album Sons and Fascination. The B-side is an instrumental version of "This Earth That You Walk Upon", which later appeared on the album with newly recorded vocals. Despite a sticker appearing on the 12" single promising an 'extended version', all 12" releases around the world featured the 5:04 album version.

== Background ==
The song is reportedly an ode to the close bond between Europe and America: "a relationship that's lasted across the centuries, through good and bad times, a "Love Song" between two continents." Its sound marked the beginning of a shift away from the band's early experimental phase towards a more accessible and commercial "pulsating electronic rock".

The song was written and demoed in early 1981 and was tried out live on their Canada/US Tour in March 1981 before the recording sessions for the album had begun. It has since been performed on most of the band's subsequent tours.

"Love Song" became Simple Minds' first single to enter the UK Top 50 - peaking at #47 in August 1981. It was more successful in Sweden and Australia, where it climbed into the Top 20.

== Music video ==
A music video for the song was shot. It is set in a nightclub and features a storyline of Jim Kerr as a DJ and the band members annoying other guests and getting into fights. At the end other guests are unable to leave the club until Kerr has finished the track and he then leads the band out of the club.

== Legacy ==
In 1992, a slightly remixed version of the song was released to promote the band's Glittering Prize 81/92 compilation, backed with "Alive and Kicking". This re-release finally sent "Love Song" into the UK Top 10, where it reached #6.

== Chart positions ==
Chart (1981/1982)	Peak position
Australia (Kent Music Report)	17
Sweden (Sverigetopplistan)	16
Canada RPM	38
United Kingdom (CIN)	47

Chart (1992)	Peak position
UK Singles (OCC)	6
