= Life in a Day (album) =

Studio album by Simple Minds
- Released: 20 April 1979
- Recorded: December 1978 – February 1979
- Studio: Rolling Stones Mobile; Abbey Road, London; Townhouse Studios, London
- Genre: Post-punk; new wave
- Length: 43:10
- Label: Zoom
- Producer: John Leckie

Simple Minds chronology
Life in a Day (1979)	Real to Real Cacophony (1979)

Singles from Life in a Day
- 1. "Life in a Day" Released: 30 March 1979; 2. "Chelsea Girl" Released: 22 June 1979

Life in a Day is the debut album by Scottish rock band Simple Minds, released on 20 April 1979 by record label Zoom. It reached number 30 in the UK Albums Chart. The title track and "Chelsea Girl" were issued as singles.

== Background ==
Most of the songs on the album were written and demoed in 1978 and were part of Simple Minds' live set that year. The song "Wasteland" had been written for the band's earlier incarnation as Johnny and the Selfabusers in 1977. "No Cure" is a reworking of an earlier song called "The Cocteau Twins". "Destiny" is a reworking of a song called "Sweet Things" that would open Simple Minds' live shows in 1978. The Lou Reed and Nico-influenced "Chelsea Girl" was written in March 1978 and appeared on Simple Minds' first demo tape along with "Pleasantly Disturbed", "The Cocteau Twins" and three other songs. "Someone", written in the latter half of 1978, is representative of the band's live sound at the time and was chosen as the opening track on the album. The title track originated in an arrangement used in an early version of the song "Murder Story" and was the last track written for the album in early 1979. Prior to the album's release, "Life in a Day" and "Chelsea Girl" were performed live on the BBC's The Old Grey Whistle Test in March 1979.

== Recording ==
The album was recorded between mid-December 1978 and early-February 1979 in the grounds of Farmyard Studios, Little Chalfont, Buckinghamshire, using the mobile unit The Mobile Studio, with further recording at Abbey Road Studios (including the recording of a violin section for the track "Pleasantly Disturbed"), and additional recording and mixing at Townhouse Studios, London. After the band's first choice of producer John Cale was vetoed by Arista Records, the album was produced and mixed by John Leckie. The album was completed in late February 1979.

The original working title for the album "Children of the Game" (a reference to Jean Cocteau's novel of that name) had been dropped and changed to "Life in a Day" after the band had written the title track in January 1979. The recording sessions yielded the full album, the B-side "Special View" and two unfinished out-takes, "Rosemary's Baby" and "Children of the Game". The track-listing and mastering was finalised in March 1979. Band manager Bruce Findlay made an unplanned musical contribution after some drunken "stumbling around on the keyboards" during a check-in visit to the band at the Townhouse: Leckie, who had been trying to find a middle eight for the song "All for You", eventually opted to insert a recording of Findlay's experimentation.

== Release ==
Life in a Day was released by the independent label Zoom Records and licensed to Arista Records. The album's artwork was created by Carole Moss, a friend of John Leckie. It spent six weeks in the UK Albums Chart and reached number 30 on 12 May 1979. The title track was released on 30 March as Simple Minds' debut single and reached No. 62 in the UK singles chart, spending two weeks there. "Chelsea Girl", considered by Arista Records to be the strongest track on the album, was held back as the second single by the label, but it failed to chart. A tribute to Nico and the Andy Warhol film Chelsea Girls, it was a popular live song for the band.

== Critical reception ==
Professional ratings
Review scores
Source	Rating
AllMusic	2.5/5 stars
Martin C. Strong	7/10
NME	favourable
Smash Hits	8/10

Upon its release, the album received favourable reviews in the British music press. Smash Hits' Red Starr selected it as "British Pick of the Week", calling it "a very strong debut album from an exceptionally talented new Scottish band that are certainly destined for the top. Though occasionally overdecorated and missing the urgency of their live shows, this is still a superb blend of old and new waves into punchy, imaginative mainstream rock with some classic songs."

NME's Tony Stewart praised the lyrics and arrangements despite noting the overt influences of 1970s music, and rated "Murder Story" the standout track. Although noting the album as overproduced and undermining the band's sound, he rated the album favourably.

Retrospectively, Andy Kellman of AllMusic rated the album the lowest of Simple Minds' first five album releases, remarking on its derivativeness of Magazine and Roxy Music and ranking "Someone" as the best track.

In a 2012 interview, the band's frontman Jim Kerr expressed regret that the album's production had resulted in the tracks lacking "a real spark" that was part of their live performances, and described his feelings about the album as "bittersweet". He recalled at the time, "as we were about to drive up to Scotland, someone gave me a cassette of Unknown Pleasures by Joy Division... and I thought, we've completely blown it."—ruing that their live material had sounded more like Velvet Underground and less like the Boomtown Rats.

== Track listing ==
All lyrics are written by Jim Kerr; all music is composed by Charles Burchill and Jim Kerr.

Side A
No.	Title	Length
1.	"Someone"	3:42
2.	"Life in a Day"	4:05
3.	"Sad Affair"	2:45
4.	"All for You"	2:51
5.	"Pleasantly Disturbed"	7:59

Side B
No.	Title	Length
6.	"No Cure"	3:34
7.	"Chelsea Girl"	4:34
8.	"Wasteland"	3:45
9.	"Destiny"	3:38
10.	"Murder Story"	6:17
Total length:		43:10

== Personnel ==
Adapted from the album's liner notes.

Simple Minds

- Jim Kerr – lead vocals, arrangements
- Charles Burchill – guitar, violin, vocals, arrangements
- Derek Forbes – bass, vocals, arrangements
- Brian McGee – drums, percussion, vocals, arrangements
- Michael MacNeil – keyboards, vocals, arrangements

with:

- Bruce Findlay – keyboard solo (uncredited) ("All for You")

Technical

- John Leckie – producer, engineer, arrangements
- George Chambers – tape operator
- Carole Moss – cover photography, design

== Charts ==
Chart (1979)	Peak position
UK Albums (OCC)	30
