= Empires and Dance =

Studio album by Simple Minds
- Released: 12 September 1980
- Recorded: May – July 1980
- Studios: Rockfield (Rockfield, Wales); Rolling Stones Mobile
- Genres: Post-punk; new wave; art rock; dance-rock; Eurodisco
- Length: 45:33
- Label: Arista
- Producer: John Leckie

Simple Minds chronology
Real to Real Cacophony (1979)	Empires and Dance (1980)	Sons and Fascination/Sister Feelings Call (1981)

Singles from Empires and Dance
- 1. "I Travel" Released: 17 October 1980; 2. "Celebrate" Released: 20 February 1981

Empires and Dance is the third studio album by the Scottish rock band Simple Minds. It was released on 12 September 1980 through Arista Records.

== Background ==
The album was influenced by the band's experience of travelling in Europe on their previous tour. Prior to the album the band demoed several of their new songs, including "Capital City" and "I Travel" that had appeared on that tour. "Room" was first recorded as a John Peel session in December 1979 together with three songs from Real to Real Cacophony. (These recordings were all later released as part of the 2004 box set Silver Box).

== Music and lyrics ==
Associated with the British post-punk scene at the time along with bands such as Joy Division and Echo & the Bunnymen, on Empires and Dance Simple Minds also took influence from disco and electronic music by artists such as Donna Summer, Kraftwerk and Grace Jones they heard in German nightclubs. The album includes lengthier, structured songs such as "I Travel", "This Fear of Gods" and "Thirty Frames a Second", as well as a number of more experimental tracks, such as "Constantinople Line", "Twist/Run/Repulsion" and "Kant-Kino". Jim Kerr's lyrics are written from the perspective of a character travelling in central Europe and observing. The lyrics to "This Fear of Gods" was partly inspired by a story by Jorge Luis Borges Kerr recently had read. "Twist/Run/Repulsion" features Chantalle Jeunet reading from a French translation of Nevsky Prospekt (story) by Nikolai Gogol.

== Recording and release ==
Empires and Dance was recorded from May to July 1980 in Wales at Rockfield Studios and the Rolling Stones Mobile Studio.

When first released it was priced at £3.99 (equivalent to £17 in 2025). While more successful than its non-charting predecessor (Real to Real Cacophony), Empires and Dance charted relatively poorly, peaking at only number 41 in the UK Albums Chart. According to AllMusic, this was primarily because Arista Records only released a small number of copies at a time before each batch sold out. This had the effect of limited availability for fans.

The opening track "I Travel" was released as a single in October 1980 to coincide with a UK tour. It was backed with the track "New Warm Skin" recorded during the album sessions, and the initial release also included a flexidisc with the tracks "Kaleidoscope" and "Film Theme Dub". A 12" release backed with "Kaleidoscope" and the original version of "Film Theme" were also issued, but the single failed to reach the UK chart. The track however gained a popularity in the American club scene and subsequently entered the Billboard disco chart at no.80 in February 1981. "Celebrate" was chosen as the second single coupled with "Changeling" from the previous album Real to Real Cacophony. However, it was only released after Simple Minds had left Arista. John Leckie created the single edits and an extended 12" version of the A-side, but this single too sold poorly and failed to chart.

Following the release of the album, Simple Minds transferred to Virgin Records, where they met with much greater commercial success. Arista tried to capitalise on this success by re-releasing "I Travel" as a single in 1982, along with the compilation Celebration. In 1983, Virgin re-released "I Travel" on 12", to coincide with the acquisition of the band's Arista catalogue. Both times, it still failed to chart.

== Critical reception ==
Professional ratings
Review scores
Source	Rating
AllMusic	4/5 stars
The Great Rock Discography	8/10
Pitchfork	8.1/10
Record Mirror	4/5 stars
Smash Hits	9/10
The Village Voice	C−

Empires and Dance received enthusiastic reviews in the British music press by contemporary critics. Ian Cranna in Smash Hits gave the album a 9 out of 10 rating, praising "one of Britain's most gifted and imaginative young bands" for moving into a more dance-orientated synthesizer dominated style "without losing any of their melodic instinct or emotional impact. The result has the dance rhythms of disco, the energy of new wave, haunting melodies with fleeting lyrical glimpses of a troubled modern Europe (but minus the usual "modernist" posing) - and a touch of genius at its very human heart." Writing for NME, Paul Morley called it "a weird, agitating record" . He highlighted "I Travel" as one of "the great disco-rock songs" and "the magnificent" "This Fear of Gods" as the band's "most impressive work to date", and concluded: "Simple Minds have invented their own ways, melodramatic yet modernist. An authentic new torch music. I'm dancing as fast as I can." Simon Ludgate of Record Mirror praised Empires and Dance as "one of the few classic albums of 1980." NME ranked it 19 on their "Albums Of The Year" list. More critically, Robert Christgau of The Village Voice described the album as "English DOR at its intricately ambient Eurodisco-cum-art-rock nadir."

== Legacy ==
In a retrospective review, Andy Kellman of AllMusic described Empires and Dance as a "post-punk dance classic". Trouser Press said that despite its inconsistency, Empires and Dance was an "extremely atmospheric and promising" album, "with good dance tunes and a few more quasi-psychedelic ones."

John Foxx has praised the album and Jim Kerr as a "unique" lyricist.

The album cover's faux Cyrillic typeface was emulated for the cover of Manic Street Preachers' third album The Holy Bible, released in 1994. (While the former album reversed all Rs and Ns to resemble Cyrillic letters, the latter album, in contrast, reversed only the Rs.) Twenty years later, Empires and Dance would be cited as a key influence on Futurology, the Manics' twelfth album. It remains one of singer and guitarist James Dean Bradfield's favourite records. He said of Empires and Dance in a 1995 Melody Maker article on his favourite albums:

"I've always liked records which are completely misinformed and displaced. They were aware that they were Scottish, and trying to shun it. [...] Anyway, that's why they tried to become really European, this dark, unemotive, industrial band, but in demographic/geographic terms they were really confused, and that can produce brilliant records. I don't think the British look towards Europe in the rose-tinted way Americans do. We see it in Basil Fawlty-ish terms. I remember reading Jim Kerr going on about the Baader-Meinhof gang, and the Red Brigade, and trying to make sense of all these conflicting ideologies. On musical terms it really does make sense. The best bands manifest their lyrics into their music, and it really fucks me off when people don't realise that."

Imagery in Patrik Sampler's novel The Ocean Container was inspired by "Thirty Frames a Second".

== Track listing ==
All lyrics are written by Jim Kerr; all music is composed by Simple Minds.

Side A
No.	Title	Length
1.	"I Travel"	4:00
2.	"Today I Died Again"	4:36
3.	"Celebrate"	5:03
4.	"This Fear of Gods"	7:03

Side B
No.	Title	Length
1.	"Capital City"	6:15
2.	"Constantinople Line"	4:43
3.	"Twist/Run/Repulsion"	4:31
4.	"Thirty Frames a Second"	5:02
5.	"Kant-Kino"	1:52
6.	"Room"	2:28

== Personnel ==
Adapted from the album's liner notes.

Simple Minds

- Charlie Burchill – guitar, saxophone
- Derek Forbes – bass guitar, fretless bass guitar
- Jim Kerr – vocals
- Mick MacNeil – keyboards
- Brian McGee – drums

Technical

- John Leckie – production, engineering
- Hugh Jones – engineering
- The Artifex Studio – artwork
- Michael Ruetz – front cover photography
- Richard Coward – photography

== Charts ==
Chart (1980–81)	Peak position
New Zealand Albums (RMNZ)	47
UK Albums (Official Charts)	41
