= Real to Real Cacophony =

Studio album by Simple Minds
- Released: 23 November 1979
- Recorded: September 1979
- Studios: Rockfield (Rockfield, Wales)
- Genres: Post-punk; new wave; art rock; (proto) synth-pop
- Length: 40:46
- Labels: Zoom; Arista
- Producer: John Leckie

Simple Minds chronology
Life in a Day (1979)	Real to Real Cacophony (1979)	Empires and Dance (1980)

Singles from Real to Real Cacophony
- 1. "Changeling" Released: January 1980

Real to Real Cacophony (sometimes incorrectly referred as Reel to Real Cacophony) is the second studio album by Scottish rock band Simple Minds. It was released on 23 November 1979 through record labels Zoom and Arista.

== Recording ==
Real to Real Cacophony was recorded and mixed in five weeks at Rockfield Studios. According to producer John Leckie, the band had only four songs beforehand ("Premonition", "Factory", "Calling Your Name" and "Changeling") and the rest of the album was written in the studio.

Dissatisfied with their first album Life in a Day (1979), the band this time went for a completely different approach to find a sound of their own, working more spontaneously and incorporating the opportunities, potential and atmosphere of the studio in the compositional procedure. German Krautrock was a major influence on the album, with the band adopting a more experimental, electronic sound drawing influences from the motorik, repetitive grooves of bands such as Neu!, Kraftwerk and La Düsseldorf.

== Release ==
Real to Real Cacophony was less successful than Life in a Day; it did not chart, nor did its only single, "Changeling". This was partly due to poor promotion and marketing by Arista Records who did not like the album and released the single two months after it.

The 2002/2003 reissues by Virgin Records incorrectly render the album's title as Reel to Real Cacophony, and the opening track as "Reel to Real". The new spelling also appears in the discography section of all the inlays in the 2002/2003 Simple Minds remastered edition series. Subsequent editions render the title of both the album and track correctly.

== Critical reception ==
Professional ratings
Review scores
Source	Rating
AllMusic	4.5/5 stars
Pitchfork	8.5/10
The Rolling Stone Album Guide	2/5 stars
Smash Hits	8/10

Real to Real Cacophony has been generally well received by critics. In Sounds, John Gill wrote: "Real to Real Cacophony shows a considerable – and brave – progression. It captures some of the shock-effects of the avant-garde, some of the emotional power of outfits like the Pop Group, yet still retains the best of the Minds tight and trebly riffing. File under impressive." The Guardian noted the "controlled considered style based on the mid-Seventies art-pop of Bowie and Ferry," writing that "it's clever and derivative ... but still worthwhile". Smash Hits' Red Starr found that "this excellent, imaginative young band disappear into a whirlpool of electronic effects, Magazine and Bryan Ferry impersonations. After repeated plays the strength of the music and feeling (lyrics largely inaudible) win through for a memorable if still only partly enjoyable album."

Retrospectively, Andy Kellman of AllMusic praised Real to Real Cacophony, saying that it marked the point "where Simple Minds ventured beyond the ability to mimic their influences and began to manipulate them, mercilessly pushing them around and shaping them into funny objects the way a child transforms a chunk of Play-Doh from an indefinable chunk of nothing into a definable chunk of something", and calling it "an achievement that's on a plane with other 1979 post-punk landmarks like Metal Box, 154, Entertainment! and Unknown Pleasures". Eric Chappe of CMJ New Music Monthly highlighted Simple Minds' "determination to constantly add unexpected touches to the arrangements". Bob Stanley wrote in Record Collector that the album "should be hailed as a singularly strong post-punk-into-synth-pop bridge but the shadow of 'Belfast Child' looms over their legacy." Trouser Press was more lukewarm, remarking that the album "lives up (or down) to the clever title".

== Track listing ==
All lyrics are written by Jim Kerr; all music is composed by Simple Minds (Kerr, Charles Burchill, Derek Forbes, Brian McGee, Michael MacNeil).

Side A
No.	Title	Length
1.	"Real to Real"	2:47
2.	"Naked Eye"	2:21
3.	"Citizen (Dance of Youth)"	2:53
4.	"Carnival (Shelter in a Suitcase)"	2:49
5.	"Factory"	4:13
6.	"Cacophony"	1:40
7.	"Veldt"	3:20

Side B
No.	Title	Length
1.	"Premonition"	5:29
2.	"Changeling"	4:11
3.	"Film Theme"	2:27
4.	"Calling Your Name"	5:05
5.	"Scar"	3:31

== Personnel ==
Adapted from the album's liner notes.

Simple Minds

- Jim Kerr – vocals, arrangements
- Charles Burchill – guitar, violin, saxophone, arrangements
- Derek Forbes – bass guitar, arrangements
- Brian McGee – drums, percussion, arrangements
- Michael MacNeil – keyboards, arrangements

Technical

- John Leckie – producer, engineer, mixing, arrangements
- Mariella Frostrup (credited as "Mariella Sometimes") – tape operator
- Paul Henry – sleeve, packaging
- Graphyk – sleeve graphics
- Sheila Rock – sleeve photography
- Trevor Rodgers – sleeve photography
