= Sons and Fascination/Sister Feelings Call =

Studio album by Simple Minds
- Released: 4 September 1981
- Studios: Farmyard Studios, Little Chalfont, Buckinghamshire; Regent's Park Studios, London
- Genres: New wave; post-punk; progressive pop; synth-pop; art rock
- Length: 78:59 (originally 43:50 + 35:09)
- Label: Virgin
- Producer: Steve Hillage

Simple Minds chronology
Empires and Dance (1980)	Sons and Fascination/Sister Feelings Call (1981)	Themes for Great Cities 79/81 (1981)

Simple Minds studio albums chronology
Empires and Dance (1980)	Sons and Fascination/Sister Feelings Call (1981)	New Gold Dream (81/82/83/84) (1982)

Alternative cover
- Individual Sons and Fascination cover

Alternative cover
- Individual Sister Feelings Call cover

Singles from Sons and Fascination/Sister Feelings Call
- 1. "The American" Released: 15 May 1981; 2. "Love Song" Released: 7 August 1981; 3. "Sweat in Bullet" Released: 23 October 1981

Sons and Fascination/Sister Feelings Call is the fourth studio album by Scottish rock band Simple Minds; it is a double album. It was released in September 1981 and was their first to reach a wide international audience. It includes the singles "The American", "Love Song" and "Sweat in Bullet".

== Overview ==
Sons and Fascination and Sister Feelings Call are two separate albums assembled from the same sessions and released at the same time. They were originally available as a double album for approximately the first month of release, after which they were made available as separate single albums. The first CD release in 1985 contained the entirety of Sons and Fascination and most of Sister Feelings Call, but two tracks from the latter—"League of Nations" and "Sound in 70 Cities"—were not included, as the maximum running time for CDs at the time was 74 minutes, and the band's record company, Virgin Records, were unwilling to issue the material as a double CD. By the time Simple Minds' back catalogue was remastered for CD in 2002/2003, the maximum running time for CDs had extended to 80 minutes, and Sons and Fascination/Sister Feelings Call was reissued now with all the tracks from both albums on one CD.

== Recording ==
The sessions were the last by the band's original line-up. Drummer Brian McGee left shortly after, and was replaced by Kenny Hyslop for the subsequent tour. Hyslop also appeared in the "Sweat in Bullet" and "Love Song" videos.

Having ended their contract with Arista Records, the sessions were the first recordings the band made for Virgin Records. They worked with producer Steve Hillage, who was a guitarist in the progressive rock band Gong. One thing Hillage and Simple Minds had in common was a love of krautrock music. The band's previous three albums were produced by John Leckie.

The rhythm section was made more prominent than on any earlier album of the band, loud, heavy and sometimes anchoring a track to one or two driving rhythm patterns, but also often put at moving angles with some of the other instruments or with Jim Kerr's vocals (as in "The American" or "Sweat in Bullet"); this gave the songs a spatial, multi-planed and atmospheric sound, whilst keeping up propulsion.

The band recorded fifteen backing tracks for the album but could not decide which tracks to keep, and therefore started to talk about making a double album. During the hectic recording sessions the band exhausted their budget and the work on some tracks was unfinished. Kerr later said: "In retrospect I think we tried to achieve the impossible. We wanted to record a double album on the budget of a single one. But at that moment, we were so full of ideas, and we thought they were all useful. So we decided to record everything and ended up with a huge mess, a veritable nightmare". Unwilling to scrap some of the songs they decided to release all the material as a limited edition double set.

"The American" was the first song completed during the recording sessions and quickly released as a single in May 1981. The song was inspired by the bright colours of an exhibition of modern American art Kerr had seen.

"Love Song" was recorded and released as a single a month before the still uncompleted album was released. The B-side "This Earth That You Walk Upon" is an instrumental track originating from a studio jam by Mick MacNeil. After the release of the single the band decided to add lyrics to the song and included the new vocal version on the album.

== Releases ==
If viewed as a double album, Sons and Fascination/Sister Feelings Call is the fourth Simple Minds album, while if viewed individually, Sons and Fascination is their fourth and Sister Feelings Call is their fifth. The first 10,000 copies of the original release were a double album, after which they were made available as separate single albums. The albums were charted together, reaching number 11 on the UK Albums Chart, number 31 on the Australian Kent Music Report chart, number 46 on the Canadian RPM National Top 50 Albums Chart, number seven on the New Zealand RIANZ chart and number four on the Swedish Sverigetopplistan chart. In 1986, Sons and Fascination/Sister Feelings Call was certified gold by the British Phonographic Industry.

The restructured Canadian version of the Sons and Fascination album (expanded to ten tracks, six of the eight on the UK release and a further four taken from Sister Feelings Call, there shortened to five tracks on the vinyl release and six tracks on cassette) had a significantly different running order, beginning with "Love Song".

The first CD release in 1985 was a single CD containing the entirety of Sons and Fascination and five of the seven tracks from Sister Feelings Call. Because two tracks from Sister Feelings Call had been dropped due to the technical limitations of Compact Discs at the time (the disc's recording duration having to fit within 74 minutes), the album was therefore not complete. The dropped tracks were "League of Nations" and "Sound in 70 Cities" (an instrumental version of Sons and Fascination's "70 Cities as Love Brings the Fall"), both of which later, in 1990, appeared for the first time on CD as a CD single with the 12-inch cut (extended mix) of "The American" as leading track. In 2002, Sons and Fascination/Sister Feelings Call was reissued in a remastered edition on CD.

In 2012, Virgin Records released the X5 CD box set containing the band's first five albums, each containing extra tracks. This could be considered to contain the definitive version of the album(s), collecting all the tracks spread across the various releases to date.

=== Singles ===
"The American", "Love Song" and "Sweat in Bullet" were released as singles. "The American" preceded the album and became the group's first charting single in the UK since "Life in a Day" in 1979 reaching number 59.

"Love Song" followed and charted slightly higher at No. 47 in the UK. "Love Song" proved to be the first breakout hit for the group charting across several countries. It was a Top 20 hit in Sweden and Australia.

"Sweat in Bullet" was remixed for single release by Peter Walsh. The single reached number 52 in the UK, number 47 in New Zealand and number 17 in Sweden. Walsh went on to produce the band's following album New Gold Dream (81/82/83/84) in 1982.

== Critical reception ==
Professional ratings
Sons and Fascination
Review scores
Source	Rating
AllMusic	3/5 stars

Professional ratings
Sister Feelings Call
Review scores
Source	Rating
AllMusic	3/5 stars

Professional ratings
Double album
Review scores
Source	Rating
AllMusic	3.5/5 stars
Encyclopedia of Popular Music	3/5 stars
The Great Rock Discography	8/10
NME	Unfavourable
Record Mirror	4/5 stars
Smash Hits	8/10

Reviewing Sons and Fascination/Sister Feelings Call for The Face, Ian Cranna praised the album as "mostly first-rate stuff" and noted that "if Jim Kerr's lyrics have taken a turn for the more obscure then the moving hesitancy of his delivery communicates the urgency of the message powerfully enough." Mark Cooper of Record Mirror said that it "confirms the promise of Empires and Dance", while John Gill of Sounds wrote, "Experience has brought further subjects within their vision; quite literally, from angels to nazis. They have the guts, the drive, the rhythm-poetry-inspiration to do it and say it." Less receptive was NME critic Chris Bohn, who deemed the album "excessively and inexcusably laboured."

Sons and Fascination/Sister Feelings Call was ranked by Sounds as the 18th best album of 1981. The listeners of Toronto-area alternative radio station CFNY-FM voted it the best album of 1981 (in a tie with King Crimson's Discipline). The Swedish music magazine Schlager ranked it as the 4th best album of 1981.

== Legacy ==
In 2007, Mojo included it as one of the "80 Best Albums of the 1980s". The same year, The Guardian selected the record as one of the "1000 Albums to Hear Before You Die", writing, "Before they descended into epic pomp-rock bluster, Simple Minds were purveyors of supremely romantic, slyly futuristic synthpop. Sons and Fascination found them cannily mining a seam of mesmerising, shimmering art-rock, while tracks like 'Love Song' were so gorgeously lustrous that you could even forgive them their future." In The Essential Rock Discography (2006), Martin C. Strong rated Sons and Fascination/Sister Feelings Call highly and wrote: "Simple Minds were beginning to find their niche, incorporating their artier tendencies into more conventional and melodic song structures."

== Track listing ==
Sons and Fascination

All lyrics are written by Jim Kerr; all music is composed by Simple Minds.

Side A
No.	Title	Length
1.	"In Trance as Mission"	6:50
2.	"Sweat in Bullet"	4:30
3.	"70 Cities as Love Brings the Fall"	4:48
4.	"Boys from Brazil"	5:30

Side B
No.	Title	Length
5.	"Love Song"	5:03
6.	"This Earth That You Walk Upon"	5:26
7.	"Sons and Fascination"	5:23
8.	"Seeing out the Angel"	6:11

Sister Feelings Call

All lyrics are written by Jim Kerr; all music is composed by Simple Minds.

Side A
No.	Title	Length
1.	"Theme for Great Cities"	5:50
2.	"The American"	3:49
3.	"20th Century Promised Land"	4:53

Side B
No.	Title	Length
4.	"Wonderful in Young Life"	5:20
5.	"League of Nations"	4:55
6.	"Careful in Career"	5:08
7.	"Sound in 70 Cities" (Dub mix of "70 Cities as Love Brings the Fall")	5:01

The Canadian versions of both Sons and Fascination and Sister Feelings Call have tracklists and running orders differing from the original versions – Sons gained four tracks ("Theme for Great Cities", "The American", "20th Century Promised Land" and "League of Nations") from Sister, while two tracks ("70 Cities as Love Brings the Fall" and "Seeing out the Angel") were transferred to Sister in return. Sons thus contained ten rather than eight tracks, and Sister five rather than seven tracks.

Sons and Fascination (Canadian version)

All lyrics are written by Jim Kerr; all music is composed by Simple Minds.

Side A
No.	Title	Length
1.	"Love Song"	5:03
2.	"Theme for Great Cities"	5:50
3.	"This Earth That You Walk Upon"	5:26
4.	"Sweat in Bullet"	4:30
5.	"In Trance as Mission"	6:50

Side B
No.	Title	Length
6.	"The American"	3:49
7.	"20th Century Promised Land"	4:53
8.	"League of Nations"	4:55
9.	"Boys from Brazil"	5:30
10.	"Sons and Fascination"	5:23

Sister Feelings Call (Canadian version)

All lyrics are written by Jim Kerr; all music is composed by Simple Minds.

Side A
No.	Title	Length
1.	"70 Cities as Love Brings the Fall"	4:48
2.	"Careful in Career"	5:08
3.	"Seeing out the Angel"	6:11

Side B
No.	Title	Length
4.	"Wonderful in Young Life"	5:20
5.	"Sound in 70 Cities" (Dub mix of "70 Cities as Love Brings the Fall")	5:01

Sons and Fascination/Sister Feelings Call

The 2002 remastered reissue includes all titles from both albums. It was also released in heavy duty gatefold picture card sleeve with black inner sleeve. The original 1985 CD omits "League of Nations" and "Sound in 70 Cities" due to the space constraints in force then.

All lyrics are written by Jim Kerr; all music is composed by Simple Minds.

No.	Title	Length
1.	"In Trance as Mission"	6:50
2.	"Sweat in Bullet"	4:30
3.	"70 Cities as Love Brings the Fall"	4:48
4.	"Boys from Brazil"	5:30
5.	"Love Song"	5:03
6.	"This Earth That You Walk Upon"	5:26
7.	"Sons and Fascination"	5:23
8.	"Seeing out the Angel"	6:11
9.	"Theme for Great Cities"	5:50
10.	"The American"	3:49
11.	"20th Century Promised Land"	4:53
12.	"Wonderful in Young Life"	5:20
13.	"League of Nations"	4:55
14.	"Careful in Career"	5:08
15.	"Sound in 70 Cities" (Dub mix of "70 Cities as Love Brings the Fall")	5:01

== Personnel ==
Adapted from the album's liner notes.

Simple Minds

- Jim Kerr – voice
- Charlie Burchill – guitars
- Mick MacNeil – keyboards
- Derek Forbes – basses
- Brian McGee – drums

Additional personnel

- Ken Lockie – backing vocals
- Jaqui – backing vocals

Technical

- Steve Hillage – producer
- Hugh Jones – engineer (Farmyard Studios)
- Alan Jakoby – engineer (Regents Park Studios)
- Malcolm Garrett, Assorted iMaGes – design, direction
- Sheila Rock – photography

== Charts ==
Chart (1981–82)	Peak position
Australian Albums (Kent Music Report)	31
Canada Top Albums/CDs (RPM)	46
New Zealand Albums (RMNZ)	7
Swedish Albums (Sverigetopplistan)	4
UK Albums (Official Charts)	11

== Certifications ==
Region	Certification	Certified units/sales
United Kingdom (BPI)	Gold	100,000^{^}
^{^} Shipments figures based on certification alone.
