= Brian McGee (drummer) =

Scottish musician (born 1959)

- Born: 8 March 1959 (age 67)
- Origin: Gorbals, Glasgow, Scotland
- Genres: Punk rock, post-punk, new wave, pop rock, alternative rock
- Occupation: Musician
- Instruments: Drums, percussion, vocals
- Labels: Zoom, Virgin

Brian McGee (born 8 March 1959) is a Scottish drummer who played in different bands like Simple Minds and Endgames. His brother Owen, under the name Owen Paul, had a hit single with a cover of Marshall Crenshaw's "You're My Favorite Waste of Time".

McGee met future Simple Minds frontman Jim Kerr at Holyrood R.C. Secondary School, and joined him and other friends (guitarist Charlie Burchill and bassist Tony Donald) from the same school in the band Biba-Rom!, around the mid-1970s, while still at school. In 1977, they formed the punk band Johnny and the Self Abusers, whose name changed to Simple Minds. He was present on the albums Life in a Day, Real to Real Cacophony, Empires and Dance and Sons and Fascination. In August 1981, he left Simple Minds after having tired of constant touring and life with the band.

After working in his parents' pub, he joined Endgames, replacing David Wilde who left to tour with another Glasgow based band, Altered Images. After two albums, the band dissolved in 1985. By that time, he, along with former Simple Minds bandmate Derek Forbes, joined Propaganda, remaining until 1995. In 2009, they both formed the band Ex-Simple Minds. Married to Alison McGee and step-father to Louise.
