= Mick MacNeil =

Scottish musician (born 1958)

- Born: 20 July 1958 (age 68); Isle of Barra, Scotland
- Genres: Rock, post-punk, new wave, pop rock, alternative rock
- Occupations: Musician, songwriter
- Instruments: Keyboards, accordion
- Years active: 1978–present
- Formerly of: Simple Minds, Fourgoodmen

Michael Joseph MacNeil (born 20 July 1958) is a Scottish songwriter and keyboardist. He is best known as a former member of the group Simple Minds.

== Early life ==
One of seven siblings, MacNeil grew up in a musical family listening to traditional Scottish folk music, and was trained as a folk music accordionist from seven to sixteen. At 16, he formed a band called the Barnets with his drum-playing brother, playing cover songs at local cabaret clubs, weddings and social clubs and once appearing on the television programme Junior Showtime.

== Career ==
MacNeil joined Simple Minds as their keyboard player in spring 1978. At this point, he had only recently discovered pop music and was unaware of contemporary new wave bands Magazine and Ultravox, to which his keyboard playing would be compared.

During his time with Simple Minds, MacNeil was recognised as one of the main composers that contributed to the band's success throughout the 1980s, releasing the UK number three album New Gold Dream (81–82–83–84) in 1982, and then scoring four consecutive UK number one albums with Sparkle in the Rain (1984), Once Upon a Time (1985), Live in the City of Light (1987) and Street Fighting Years (1989), and one UK number one single "Belfast Child" (1989). Exhausted by the relentless touring schedules MacNeil left the band in January 1990.

After leaving Simple Minds, he occasionally joined Simple Minds-related projects such as Fourgoodmen (along with fellow ex-Simple Minds member Derek Forbes plus Ian Henderson and Bruce Watson) and XSM (with Forbes and original Simple Minds drummer Brian McGee). In 2003 and 2018 respectively, MacNeil contributed with accordion backing tracks to Simple Minds songs "Dirty Old Town" and their cover version of "Brothers in Arms" on the album Reimagines the Eighties. He also contributed keyboards and programming to a reformed Visage on their final studio album Demons to Diamonds (2015). In 2016 he accepted an Ivor Novello Award for Simple Minds "Outstanding Song Collection".

MacNeil released a solo album called People, Places, Things on his own record label, Mix Records, in 1997.

== Equipment ==
During the early years of Simple Minds (the first four albums, between 1978 and 1982), MacNeil used a Farfisa organ and a "tiny wee Korg, two oscillators on it... It was a stupid sound, but it had lots of good noises on it." He added a Roland Jupiter-4 programmable polyphonic synthesiser in the early 1980s, which featured heavily on the Sons and Fascination and Sister Feelings Call albums.

In 1986, MacNeil's stage equipment included a Yamaha CP-70 piano (used as his master keyboard via MIDI), a Yamaha DX7, an Emulator II, an Oberheim OB-8, a Roland Jupiter-8 and an unspecified Kurzweil keyboard using an Apple Macintosh for program saving. He was also using an Elka accordion with MIDI capacity.
