= Derek Forbes =

Scottish musician (born 1956)

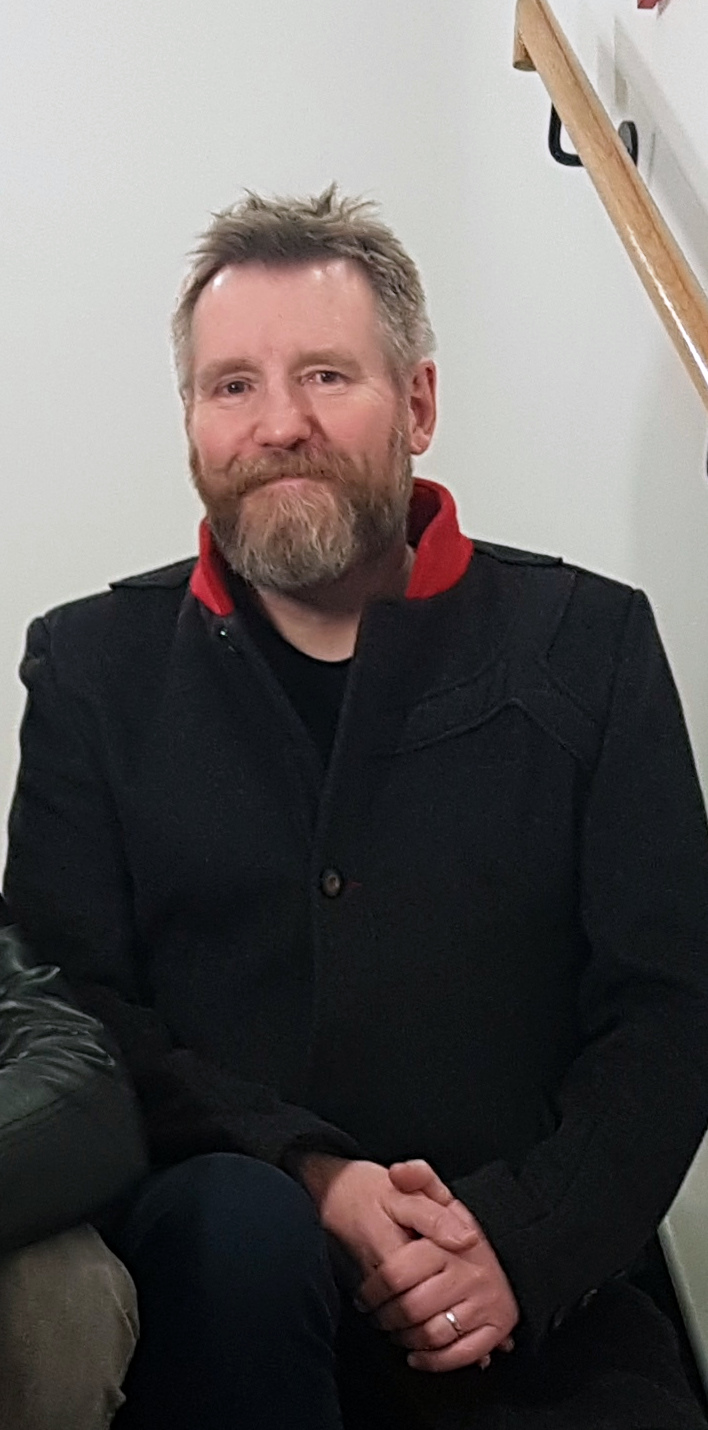
- Forbes at CamGlen Radio, December 2018

Background information
- Born: 22 June 1956 (age 70)
- Origin: Glasgow, Scotland
- Genres: Rock, post-punk, new wave, pop rock, alternative rock
- Occupations: Musician, songwriter
- Instruments: Bass guitar, guitar, vocals, keyboards, mandolin, banjo, percussion
- Years active: 1977–present

Derek Forbes (born 22 June 1956) is a Scottish musician. He is mostly associated with the Scottish band Simple Minds, having joined in time to record their early demos in 1978 and stayed with the band during their rise to mainstream success and their first six albums, until leaving shortly after their 1985 hit "Don't You (Forget About Me)" (subsequently rejoining in a reduced role from 1996 to 1998). He has also played with Big Country, Propaganda, Oblivion Dust, Spear of Destiny, Kirk Brandon's 10:51 and The Alarm, as well as leading his own projects.

== Career ==
A former member of the Scottish punk band Subs, Forbes replaced Tony Donald as bassist for Simple Minds in 1978, remaining in the band for seven years and six albums before being ousted in 1985. Despite this, he remained closely associated with Simple Minds and has described them as "the band I never left." He contributed overdubs to their post-Forbes live album Live in the City of Light and, having turned down a chance to rejoin the band in 1989, subsequently rejoined for a three-year period from 1996 to 1998 (before and during the recording of Néapolis). He and the band's erstwhile drummer Mel Gaynor also appeared at Scotland Rocks for Kosovo in 1999 performing Led Zeppelin's "Kashmir", whilst a new version of Simple Minds also appeared on the bill (with Mark Kerr on drums and Eddie Duffy on bass). Forbes was also part of the abortive reunion of the original band in 2008. While still nominally being out of Simple Minds, he has assisted at selected rehearsals, writing and recording sessions, and played versions of the band's music with his own separate projects.

After Simple Minds, Forbes went on to play in a number of other bands, including Propaganda (Germany) and Oblivion Dust (Japan), Spear of Destiny, 10:51 and the Alarm. Forbes sang with David Bowie on the Iggy Pop album Soldier. He played bass on the Kirsty MacColl hit "A New England". Forbes has also performed onstage with Peter Gabriel.

Forbes also played in Fourgoodmen, a Scottish supergroup, between 2005 and 2007, and formed XSM, who were originally to consist of Forbes, MacNeil, and McGee from the original Simple Minds line up. XSM recorded an album's worth of tracks, but Mick MacNeil didn't want to perform live, so Forbes and McGee took the band out, along with Owen Paul (McGee), sibling of Brian McGee. The guitar and keyboard player roles were twofold, with Steven Curley (version 1) on guitar, followed by Ant Seaman guitar (version 2) and Gary O'Hagan on keyboards (version 1) and Andy Gall keyboards (version 2).

Forbes was voted 'Best Bass Player in the World' in 1982, and 'Best International Bass Player' in a music poll in Australia, the same year. Forbes was also voted 'Best Bass Player in UK'. In 2009, Forbes was voted 'Scotland's Greatest Ever Bassist' by the readers of Dear Scotland, and his life and work is the subject of a biography in both print and film by writer/director Ethan Dettenmaier.

Forbes had his own radio show on LA Talk Radio for two years, May the Forbes Be with You. Production stopped after he joined Big Country in 2012, replacing bassist Tony Butler. Forbes left the band in 2015.

Forbes was a featured extra in the film This Is Not a Love Song.

He also toured the East Coast of America from 2015 to 2017 with his all-American band, Derek Forbes Band. Members include John McNutt (ex-Spear of Destiny), Danny Beisell (Fosterchild and American Vinyl), Tim McKinstrey and Marc Iezzi.

Forbes was awarded an Ivor Novello in 2016, for Outstanding Song Collection, for his songwriting for Simple Minds, amongst others.

On 22 June 2016, Forbes released a solo album titled Echoes containing 11 songs he composed with Simple Minds in their early years, which he re-recorded as the only musician involved in the project.

== ZANTi ==
ZANTi is Forbes's band and album project with Anni Hogan (ex-Marc and the Mambas). ZANTi have released one album, Broken Hearted City, on Downwards Records with Forbes and Hogan on all writing, arranging, performing and producing duties.
