= Themes – Volume 4: February 89–May 90 =

Themes – Volume 4: February 89 – May 90

Box set by Simple Minds
- Released: 15 October 1990
- Genre: Rock
- Label: Virgin

Simple Minds chronology
Themes – Volume 3: September 85–June 87 (1990)	Themes – Volume 4: February 89 – May 90 (1990)	Real Life (1991)

Professional ratings
Review scores
Source	Rating
AllMusic	1.5/5 stars
Q	3/5 stars

Themes – Volume 4: February 89 – May 90 is box set released by Simple Minds. It was released on 9 October 1990 by Virgin Records.

== Track listing ==
Theme 16 – The Ballad of the Streets/Belfast Child
No.	Title	Length
1.	"Belfast Child"	6.45
2.	"Mandela Day"	5.45
3.	"Biko"	7.32

Theme 17 – This Is Your Land
No.	Title	Length
1.	"This Is Your Land"	6.17
2.	"Saturday Girl"	6.10
3.	"Year of the Dragon"	3.05

Theme 18 – Kick It In
No.	Title	Length
1.	"Kick It In"	6.05
2.	"Waterfront" (Steve Lillywhite '89 Mix)	5.29
3.	"Big Sleep (Note: Recorded live by Fleetwood Mobile.)"	6.35
4.	"Kick It In" (Unauthorised Mix)	7.04

Theme 19 – The Amsterdam EP
No.	Title	Length
1.	"Sign o' the Times"	5.35
2.	"Let It All Come Down"	4.58
3.	"Sign o' the Times" (CJ MacKintosh Remix)	6.15
4.	"Jerusalem"	2.59

Theme 20 – Verona (Note: Recorded live in Verona 14–15 September 1989 on the Fleetwood Mobile.)
No.	Title	Length
1.	"Street Fighting Years"	10.02
2.	"Mandela Day"	8.15
3.	"Kick It In"	6.47
