= Real Life (Simple Minds album) =

Studio album by Simple Minds
- Released: 8 April 1991
- Recorded: 1990–1991
- Studios: Bonny Wee, Scotland; Wisseloord, the Netherlands; A&M, Hollywood; Maison Rouge, London; Ca Va, Scotland; Townhouse, London
- Genre: Pop rock
- Length: 52:15
- Labels: Virgin (Europe); A&M (US)
- Producer: Stephen Lipson

Simple Minds chronology
Themes - Volume 4: February 89–May 90 (1990)	Real Life (1991)	Glittering Prize 81/92 (1992)

Simple Minds studio albums chronology
Street Fighting Years (1989)	Real Life (1991)	Good News from the Next World (1995)

Singles from Real Life
- 1. "Let There Be Love" Released: 11 March 1991; 2. "See the Lights" Released: 13 May 1991; 3. "Stand by Love" Released: 12 August 1991; 4. "Real Life" Released: 14 October 1991

North American cover art

Professional ratings
Review scores
Source	Rating
AllMusic	2/5 stars
Martin C. Strong	5/10
NME	1/10
Rolling Stone	2/5 stars

Real Life is the ninth studio album by Scottish rock band Simple Minds, released in April 1991 by record label Virgin Records worldwide apart from the US, where it was released by A&M. The lead single from the album, "Let There Be Love", was released in March 1991 and achieved commercial success, reaching the top ten in territories including the United Kingdom, Ireland, Denmark and Sweden. A further three singles – "See the Lights", "Stand by Love" and "Real Life" continued this commercial success.

Commercially, the album continued a period of popularity for the band, reaching the top ten in the United Kingdom, Switzerland, Germany, Sweden and Norway. It was certified Platinum by the British Phonographic Industry (BPI) in the United Kingdom for sales in excess of 300,000 copies, whilst it was certified Gold in other territories including the Netherlands, Spain and Sweden.

== Background and recording ==
This was the first album without founding member keyboardist Mick MacNeil as he left the band to spend time with his family. Peter-John Vettese played keyboards on the album. The rest of the band included lead singer Jim Kerr, guitarist Charlie Burchill who also took up keyboards, and drummer Mel Gaynor. Bass was played by Malcolm Foster. Stephen Lipson, who had co-produced Street Fighting Years produced the album and also played some bass parts. "Let the Children Speak" is based on the 1981 Simple Minds instrumental "Theme for Great Cities" from Sister Feelings Call. A re-recorded version of that piece, called "Theme for Great Cities '91", appeared as a B-side of the "See the Lights" single. "Travelling Man" bears some resemblance to the 1983 song "Waterfront" from Sparkle in the Rain.

"Rivers of Ice" is based on "Dr. Mackay's Farewell to Creagorry", an instrumental written by accordionist Iain MacLachlan in 1958. It became famous after being adapted for the 1962 BBC thriller The Dark Island. "When Two Worlds Collide" is based on the title track "Real Life", as is the 1995 song "And the Band Played On", which subsequently appeared on the following album, Good News from the Next World. "Women and Ghosts" (included on the US edition of the 1995 single "Hypnotised") is a reworked instrumental version of the title track.

== Release ==
The album reached no. 2 in the UK, and no. 74 in the United States. All four singles from the album were Top 40 hits in the UK, including the Top 10 hit "Let There Be Love". In the US, "See the Lights" reached the Top 40 and also reached no. 1 on the US Modern Rock Tracks chart. In America, the front and back covers were switched and the front was now the photo of the band on the white background. The US version of the cover is what has been used on reissues of the album.

Virgin reissued the CD as part of the Simple Minds remasters in late 2002 and early 2003. On the remastered version, a couple of differences are apparent when compared to the first edition: the 2002/2003 remaster features an extended mix of "Let There Be Love", not the one used on the first edition of the album, although it is not mentioned on the cover or in the booklet; the segues between tracks have also been re-edited, so that the running time of individual tracks may differ slightly between the editions; also, the CD version of the first edition had "Banging on the Door" split into two tracks in the disc's table of contents (running time was 1:16 + 4:22), but the music as such did not indicate any break between the parts. On the 2002/2003 reissue, the track is indexed as one.

The Australian edition included a bonus CD with 5 live tracks titled Live At Barrowland. However, two of the tracks were recorded at Universal Amphitheatre, Los Angeles, USA with the remaining three songs taken from the concert at Barrowland, Glasgow, UK.

== Reception ==
The album received mostly negative reviews from critics. In Rolling Stone, Paul Evans said: "What might have been the band's most cohesive record misses, if only by frustrating inches."

AllMusic's Alex Henderson opined: "Real Life isn't terrible, but play it next to any of [the band's previous three] albums, and you're reminded how much less inspired their writing had become by the early '90s."

== Track listing ==
=== CD and cassette track listing ===
All tracks are written by Charlie Burchill and Jim Kerr, except where indicated.

No.	Title	Writer(s)	Length
1.	"Real Life"		4:53
2.	"See the Lights"		4:22
3.	"Let There Be Love"		4:57
4.	"Woman"	Burchill, Kerr, Stephen Lipson	4:40
5.	"Stand by Love"		4:04
6.	"Let the Children Speak"		4:16
7.	"African Skies"		4:52
8.	"Ghostrider"		3:22
9.	"Banging on the Door (Intro)"		1:16
10.	"Banging on the Door"		4:22
11.	"Travelling Man"	Burchill, Kerr, Lipson	3:34
12.	"Rivers of Ice"	Iain MacLachlan (music), Simple Minds (lyrics)	3:30
13.	"When Two Worlds Collide"		4:01

=== Australian bonus CD track listing ===
All tracks are written by Charlie Burchill and Jim Kerr, except where indicated.

No.	Title	Writer(s)	Length
1.	"King Is White And In The Crowd (Live)"	Kerr, Burchill, MacNeil, Forbes	4:20
2.	"Someone Somewhere (In Summertime) (Live)"	Kerr, Burchill, MacNeil, Forbes	4:29
3.	"Let There Be Love (Live)"		5:21
4.	"Banging On The Door (Live)"		5:38
5.	"Stand By Love [Live]"		4:35

=== LP track listing ===
All tracks are written by Charlie Burchill and Jim Kerr, except where indicated.

No.	Title	Writer(s)	Length
1.	"Real Life"		4:53
2.	"See the Lights"		4:22
3.	"Let There Be Love"		4:57
4.	"Woman"	Burchill, Kerr, Stephen Lipson	4:40
5.	"Stand by Love"		4:04
6.	"African Skies"		4:52
7.	"Let the Children Speak"		4:16
8.	"Ghostrider"		3:22
9.	"Banging on the Door"		5:33
10.	"Travelling Man"	Burchill, Kerr, Lipson	3:34
11.	"Rivers of Ice"	Iain MacLachlan (music), Simple Minds (lyrics)	3:30
12.	"When Two Worlds Collide"		4:01

== Personnel ==
Simple Minds

- Jim Kerr – vocals
- Charlie Burchill – guitar, keyboards
- Mel Gaynor – drums

Additional musicians

- Alfred Bos – shaft guitar on "African Skies"
- Andy Duncan – percussion
- Malcolm Foster – bass
- Lisa Germano – violin
- Carol Kenyon – backing vocals
- Stephen Lipson – production, bass, keyboards, odaiko
- Wil Malone – orchestral arrangements
- Sonia Morgan Jones – backing vocals
- Peter-John Vettese – keyboards
- Gavyn Wright – string conductor, string section leader

Studio personnel

- Dougie Cowan – technical master
- Giles Cowley – mixing, mixing assistant
- Tony Donald – equipment coordinator, equipment technician
- Simon Fowler – art direction, design, photography, stylist
- Efren Herrera – engineer
- Simon Heyworth – mastering
- Ted Jensen – mastering
- Paul Kerr – logistics
- Will Malone – orchestration, orchestral arrangements
- Heff Moraes – engineer, MIDI engineer, MIDI manager
- Stylorouge – art direction, design
- Gary Thomas – engineer
- Au Yeung, Ying Ho – catering
- Jane Ventom – A&R

== Charts ==
=== Weekly charts ===
Chart (1991)	Peak position
Australian Albums (ARIA)	13
Austrian Albums (Ö3 Austria)	11
Canada Top Albums/CDs (RPM)	17
Dutch Albums (Album Top 100)	6
Finnish Albums (The Official Finnish Charts)	11
German Albums (Offizielle Top 100)	3
New Zealand Albums (RMNZ)	11
Norwegian Albums (VG-lista)	7
Swedish Albums (Sverigetopplistan)	5
Swiss Albums (Schweizer Hitparade)	2
UK Albums (Official Charts)	2
US Billboard 200	74

=== Year-end charts ===
Chart (1991)	Position
Canada Albums (RPM)	78
Dutch Albums (Album Top 100)	42
German Albums (Offizielle Top 100)	16
Swiss Albums (Schweizer Hitparade)	8
UK Albums (OCC)	41

== Certifications ==
Region	Certification	Certified units/sales
Australia (ARIA)	Gold	35,000^{^}
France (SNEP)	2× Gold	200,000^{*}
Germany (BVMI)	Gold	250,000^{^}
Italy (FIMI)	3× Gold	300,000
Netherlands (NVPI)	Gold	50,000^{^}
Spain (Promusicae)	Gold	50,000^{^}
Sweden (GLF)	Gold	50,000^{^}
Switzerland (IFPI Switzerland)	Platinum	50,000^{^}
United Kingdom (BPI)	Platinum	300,000^{^}
^{*} Sales figures based on certification alone.^{^} Shipments figures based on certification alone.
