= Up on the Catwalk =

Single by Simple Minds

from the album Sparkle in the Rain
- B-side: "A Brass Band in Africa"
- Released: 12 March 1984
- Recorded: October 1983
- Genre: Pop rock, new wave
- Length: 4:04
- Label: Virgin
- Songwriter(s): Jim Kerr, Charlie Burchill, Derek Forbes, Mel Gaynor and Mick MacNeil
- Producer(s): Steve Lillywhite

Simple Minds singles chronology
| "Speed Your Love to Me" (1984) | "Up on the Catwalk" (1984) | "Don't You (Forget About Me)" (1985) |

"Up on the Catwalk" was the third single to be released from Sparkle in the Rain, the sixth studio album by Simple Minds. It was released in March 1984 and climbed to number 27 in the UK Singles Chart. It stayed in the charts for five weeks, which was longer than the band's previous single, "Speed Your Love to Me".

Unlike the album's previous two singles, "Waterfront" and "Speed Your Love to Me", "Up on the Catwalk" was not included in the band's 1992 compilation album Glittering Prize 81/92. However, reviewer MacKenzie Wilson of Allmusic considered this single to be the strongest song on Sparkle in the Rain, complimenting its lyrics and 'glossy' verse which "thrives on celebrity and the falling grace that coincides that". The band's lead singer Jim Kerr has retrospectively called "Up on the Catwalk" an example of Simple Minds "at their spikiest and most dramatic".

== Style ==
The song begins with an exclamation of "one, two, one, two, three, four" while the drummer, Mel Gaynor, bangs his drumsticks together, followed by "crashing drums" and keyboards by Mick MacNeil. As the song progresses it achieves the rock-oriented, "enormous sound" of the two preceding singles, thanks to extensive "reverb and echo" attributed to each instrument in the production. The keyboards play a more prominent and "thunderous" role in "Up On The Catwalk" than in "Speed Your Love To Me", particularly in the chorus after the refrain "I will be there".

== Music video ==
The promotional video for "Up On The Catwalk" begins with photo montages of parts of various people's faces forming, before switching to a studio performance of the band on a catwalk in the centre of the room. This is surrounded by a peripheral catwalk on which several figures move across during the video. During the performance Jim Kerr in dense make-up sings and dances in the middle while photo montages once again come and go during the chorus refrain "I will be there". The combination of seemingly random photo compositions, and glamorous models alternating with superhero figures on the second catwalk, while Kerr rapidly sings names of well-known persons and places, create an overall "surreal" and "disturbing" video according to Dream Giver Redux.

== Track listing ==
=== 7" single ===
- Virgin VS 661

1. "Up on the Catwalk" (edit) - 4:04

2. "A Brass Band in Africa" - 5:10

=== 12" single ===
- Virgin VS 661-12

1. "Up on the Catwalk" (Extended Mix) - 7:34

2. "A Brass Band in African Chimes" - 9:22
