= Street Fighting Years =

Studio album by Simple Minds
- Released: 2 May 1989
- Recorded: March 1988 – March 1989
- Genre: Pop rock
- Length: 61:13
- Labels: Virgin; A&M (US)
- Producers: Trevor Horn; Stephen Lipson

Simple Minds chronology
Live in the City of Light (1987)	Street Fighting Years (1989)	Themes - Volume 1: March 79–April 82 (1990)

Simple Minds studio albums chronology
Once Upon a Time (1985)	Street Fighting Years (1989)	Real Life (1991)

Singles from Street Fighting Years
- 1. "Belfast Child" Released: 6 February 1989; 2. "This Is Your Land" Released: 10 April 1989; 3. "Kick It In" Released: 17 July 1989; 4. "Let It All Come Down" Released: 27 November 1989

Street Fighting Years is the eighth studio album by Scottish rock band Simple Minds, released in May 1989 by record label Virgin Records worldwide apart from the US, where it was released by A&M. Produced by Trevor Horn and Stephen Lipson, the album reached the top of the UK Albums Chart.

== Background ==
Produced by Trevor Horn and Stephen Lipson, Street Fighting Years was a major stylistic departure from the previous album, Once Upon a Time (1985). While still maintaining the epic arena rock sense of scale and drama which the band had developed since the mid-1980s, the album also moved away from the American soul and gospel influences of its predecessor in favour of soundtrack atmospherics and a new incorporation of acoustic, Celtic and folk elements, such as fretless bass, slide guitar and accordion. The lyrics built on the more political themes which the band had introduced with "Ghost Dancing", moving away from the impressionistic or spiritual concerns of earlier 1980s Simple Minds songs and covering topics including the Poll Tax, the Soweto townships, the Berlin Wall and the stationing of nuclear submarines on the Scottish coast.

The album marked the beginning of a period of substantial personnel change for Simple Minds. Keyboard player/composer/founder member Mick MacNeil has subsequently mentioned that "Jim (Kerr) had already started talking about making changes" and the lack of equality and unity within the band's ranks soon became evident. Most of the initial writing and direction-setting sessions had only involved the trio of remaining original members – Kerr, MacNeil and guitarist Charlie Burchill – without the involvement of either bassist John Giblin or drummer Mel Gaynor, both of whom had remained in London during the Scottish residential sessions. Subsequent disagreements regarding both the recording process and the direction in which Trevor Horn was coaxing the band led to the temporary departure of Gaynor and the permanent departure of Giblin.

== Band relations ==
Despite having made significant contributions (including introducing the band to double bass on the title track and writing the ballad "Let It All Come Down"), John Giblin left Simple Minds in July 1988, halfway through the Street Fighting Years sessions. According to Kerr, Giblin unplugged his bass and walked out of both the sessions and the band without a word following a culminating disagreement with Trevor Horn. Kerr later noted that "John and Trevor didn't quite hit it off, I don't think, and John didn't quite like Trevor's instructions" and admitted "it had been a long, protracted recording process. And then there was one point when John certainly wasn't there." The band's previous bass player Derek Forbes has hinted that ultimately Giblin simply "didn't fit in" with the band; and thirty-one years later, Kerr reflected "John was seven years older than us and I suspect we were quite brattish around him. He'd done so much more than us in who he'd worked with and he was a lone wolf who didn't say much. John's stoicism added to his charm, but we always knew he was never going to sign up to Simple Minds' youth club." Following Giblin's departure, co-producer Stephen Lipson played the remaining bass guitar parts on the album.

For similar reasons, Gaynor was sidelined during the album sessions after disagreements with Horn. Kerr recalls "Trevor was trying to get Mel to do more than just 'the Mel thing'. Mel is brilliant. With certain tracks, like "Mandela Day", you're looking for something softer, perhaps. Trevor wanted him to be more diverse. Technology and drum machines were becoming a part of modern records. We always wanted to incorporate both. I remember them running out of patience with each other... Trevor really tests you. I mean, he'll go, 'That's great, got it – now give me something I'd never expect.' And I don't think Trevor felt he was getting that from Mel, I think he felt he was getting the big thud the whole time, and it worked on some tracks, but maybe not on others." Gaynor temporarily left the band, with the album being completed with session drummer Manu Katché (from Peter Gabriel's band), while former Police drummer Stewart Copeland contributed some drum programming.

Despite the upheavals, Kerr later defended Horn's various approaches. "[Trevor would] convince you anything was possible. If you think of Trevor's music, so much of his budget goes into one or two big songs that the rest of the record ends up getting done pretty quick. There's a bit of that in Street Fighting Years, but mostly he'd kick the tyres of a song over and over, trying it a dozen different ways, until something was there."

== Recording ==
The music and themes on Street Fighting Years emerged as a reaction to Simple Minds' accession to the role of stadium rock band after years of effort. Kerr later reflected "we'd had success beyond our belief and we were just on the verge of getting bored with our own thing. I don’t think we quite knew that, and we certainly didn't talk about it, and it's inevitable after ten years that it happened." After many years of lyrics which were intellectual, impressionistic or emotional in nature, Kerr had also decided that it was time to start writing about the outside world and directly political subjects, rather than his own emotional landscape (partially due to his ongoing divorce). "The last thing I wanted to write about was myself. I didn't want to sit licking my own wounds... The word 'activists' might be pushing it, but we were from that background. It was inevitable the strains of that would come out in our music."

As part of the intended changes, the band chose to work with the production team of Horn and Lipson, who between them had most recently been working with Pet Shop Boys, Frankie Goes to Hollywood, Propaganda (using several former Simple Minds bandmembers) and Grace Jones. Although the results were sometimes inspired, the process was not without difficulties, with Kerr having to have an emergency meeting with Horn after six months of very slow work. "We saw hitching our wagon to Trevor and Stephen's Fantasia production world as like strapping on rocket engines...(but) before he came along, Trevor told me, 'Jim, one of the reasons we wanted to work with you is we’re bored of our thing,'" recalls Jim. "So there we were, two camps bored of their sound, looking for the other to help. I just thought, 'Oh, for fuck's sake!'... I'm sure we didn't give Trevor and Stephen the easiest time, and it says something they didn't work together again after Street Fighting Years. We were a bit dead on our feet and it's still a frustration (that) that atmosphere was there."

The album was written and recorded during residential sessions at multiple locations – the band's own new Bonnie Wee Studio near Loch Earn in the Scottish Highlands; at a house in rural Glenstriven on the shores of Loch Striven (on Scotland's Cowal peninsula on the West Coast); at bass player John Giblin's own Barwell Court Studios in south London; and at Horn's Sarm West studios in west London. The earliest Bonnie Wee sessions took place before the studio had been fully built, and were open-ended explorations of instrumental ideas; with the band, at one point, considering launching an instrumental side project called Aurora Borealis. What became the new album's title track emerged during these sessions, and set another stylistic hallmark for the record – a break from the rhythm-section driven work of earlier album up until and including Once Upon a Time.

Having previously resisted the Scottish folk music which he had grown up with, Kerr was won back over to elements of it by Giblin, whom he had heard playing the traditional Irish folk song "She Moved Through the Fair" on piano one evening. Kerr: "John is a deep guy, which was reflected in the music he played. I was captivated by this Celtic piece and, when he finished, I said to John, 'Wow! When did you write that?' and John replied, 'About 200 years ago...'" Horn had already been pushing Kerr, without success, to work on "a Celtic song", and Kerr was now moved to seek out various covers of "She Moved Through the Fair", which the band later refashioned into "Belfast Child". Despite Kerr's initial misgivings about potentially producing a "mawkish, tokenistic and trite" adaptation, he became very proud of the song after its subsequent success as a single: "Am I still glad I did it?... too right I am. To have the balls to mess around with that big a sacred cow of the folk world? Great! The folkies were going, 'You can't fucking do that to "She Moved Through the Fair!", when the folk world changes lyrics and melodies around forever. I thought, 'Give me a break, you're only jealous you hadn't thought of it first.'"

The song "This Is Your Land" was written early in the Street Fighting Years sessions but was one of the last to be completed, since Kerr was unsure of how to finish it. After Kerr sang a verse using a Lou Reed impression, Horn suggested bringing in the actual Lou Reed for a guest spot. Initially intimidated by Reed's reputation as "the world's biggest curmudgeon", the band agreed to the suggestion, with Horn making the actual approach.

== Release ==
Released in May 1989, the album became the band's fourth number one in the UK on the back of the chart-topping single "Belfast Child", which had been released three months earlier. "This Is Your Land" was chosen as the lead single for the US, but with guest vocals from the band's idol Lou Reed, the single failed to make a mark on the pop charts. The album performed relatively poorly in the United States and produced no hit singles.

Mel Gaynor rejoined the band for the Street Fighting Years tour, and remained an on/off member of Simple Minds in subsequent years. With John Giblin's departure permanent, Malcolm Foster (formerly with The Pretenders) was hired as the new bass guitarist, although he was not made an official band member. Having grown unhappy with constant touring and other changes, and wanting to spend more time with his family, MacNeil left the band at the conclusion of the tour.

Simple Minds released on 6 March 2020 a 4-CD Super Deluxe box set edition of Street Fighting Years on UMC / Virgin Domestic, including the original album remastered at Abbey Road Studios, a CD of B-sides, edits and 12″ remixes, a 2-CD unissued Verona live show from 1989 plus brand new book including a new interview with Trevor Horn. Also available as 2-LP, 2-CD or remastered single CD.

== Critical reception ==
Professional ratings
Review scores
Source	Rating
AllMusic	4/5 stars
NME	5/10
Q	5/5 stars
Rolling Stone	2/5 stars
Smash Hits	6/10
Martin C. Strong	5/10
Sunday Mail	very favourable

Street Fighting Years received sharply divided reviews, with initial critical opinion being mostly favourable in the UK but less so in the US, where the album was much less of a commercial success. In his written commentary for the sleeve notes in the band's compilation album Glittering Prize 81/92, Brian Hogg described Street Fighting Years as arguably "the group's most controversial release." Jim Kerr remembered the album thus: "Every song seemed to be about conflict, and it describes this age of chaos, the battle to try and remain intact with all this hurricane around us."

In Britain, the album received glowing praise, including a rare five-star rating, from Q magazine; David Sinclair wrote that they had finally produced a record to justify their reputation, and praising the album's mostly quiet dynamic: "Even when the music takes off into the vast dramatic sweeps that will roll like huge breakers to the back of the stadiums of Europe this summer, there is little that could fairly be described as bluster. Simple Minds have done more than make a landmark album. They have assumed the mantle of authority." Ian Gittins, writing for Melody Maker, also commented on the grandiose nature of the album, comparing it to U2's Rattle and Hum but more artistically successful: "Unlike their true soulmates, U2, the Minds haven't produced a turkey of the first degree...Simple Minds are once again approaching the art of making music, breaking a silence, with wonder." Although he went on to criticise the tracks "Soul Crying Out", "Take a Step Back", "Kick It In", and "Biko" as "flatulent bluster", Gittins nonetheless concluded that the album's "expansive, flushed music" was "huge, but it's rarely hollow." Mike Soutar, meanwhile, wrote in Smash Hits that the album was "packed with the kind of crowd-rousing flag hoisting anthems that everyone expects from the Minds", but thought the song's individual lengths meant that while they would "probably sound epic played live, they'll probably drive you quite mad in the comfort of your own bedroom."

Less positive reviews, however, came from U.S. publications such as Rolling Stone whose writer Mark Coleman criticised the band for what the reviewer considered to be political vacuity: "Street Fighting Years stands as an unfortunate example of politicized rock at its most simple-minded." He also opined that the album's production was too clean, describing it as "so studio smooth that every song – whether it's a chugging, multi-layered call to arms ("Take a Step Back") or a floating, ambient meditation ("Let It All Come Down") – virtually slides out of the speakers." CMJ took a more positive view, admitting that Street Fighting Years "lacks the inspirational anthems of the Sparkle in the Rain era" but "focuses attention on the passion of the lyrics, which have a political awareness and social consciousness that keeps those spots where the music falls short up on a high level."

The album's grandiose, stadium-oriented stylistic departure from previous albums has since proved controversial with critics. Martin C. Strong, writing in The Essential Rock Discography, remarked that reviewers "didn't really stick the knife in until the release of the overblown "Belfast Child", a U.K. No. 1 despite its snoozeworthy meandering and vague political agenda. The accompanying album, Street Fighting Years (1989) brought more of the same, although it cemented Simple Minds' position among the coffee table elite." Meanwhile, in a retrospective review for AllMusic, Tom Demalon described Street Fighting Years as "an artistic and elegant album that might lack immediate choruses but draws in the listener" and containing "some truly lovely moments". A review of the Themes box-set released in June 2008 from Q magazine discussed, "if at times the preciousness of the later work sets the teeth on edge, the sheer musical skill and undoubted power of the band makes up for it", praising the "brilliant atmosphere Simple Minds made their own." Music critic David Stubbs, in a review of the compilation Glittering Prize 81/92, mourned what he found to be the "dramatic artistic decline (and parallel commercial rise)" of the band: "As Jim Kerr sank further into mega-stardom, the music suffered further as he indulged in piously cumbersome ballads like "Belfast Child" and "Mandela Day". John Aizlewood of Q disagreed, saying, "there was much to commend on Street Fighting Years and its follow-up, Real Life".

In 1989 Q magazine selected Street Fighting Years as one of the top recordings of the year.

== Track listing ==
All tracks are written by Simple Minds except where indicated.

Standard edition
No.	Title	Writer(s)	Length
1.	"Street Fighting Years"		6:26
2.	"Soul Crying Out"		6:07
3.	"Wall of Love"		5:20
4.	"This Is Your Land"		6:22
5.	"Take a Step Back"		4:22
6.	"Kick It In"		6:11
7.	"Let It All Come Down"	John Giblin, Simple Minds	4:56
8.	"Mandela Day"		5:45
9.	"Belfast Child"	Simple Minds, Traditional	6:42
10.	"Biko"	Peter Gabriel	7:34

CD release bonus track
No.	Title	Length
11.	"When Spirits Rise"	2:03
Total length:		61:13

Deluxe Edition Disc 1: The Original Album
No.	Title	Writer(s)	Length
1.	"Street Fighting Years"		6:26
2.	"Soul Crying Out"		6:07
3.	"Wall of Love"		5:20
4.	"This Is Your Land"		6:22
5.	"Take a Step Back"		4:22
6.	"Kick It In"		6:11
7.	"Let It All Come Down"	John Giblin, Simple Minds	4:56
8.	"Mandela Day"		5:45
9.	"Belfast Child"	Simple Minds, Traditional	6:42
10.	"Biko"	Peter Gabriel	7:34
11.	"When Spirits Rise"		2:03
Total length:			61:13

Deluxe Edition Disc 2: Edits, B-Sides and Remixes
No.	Title	Writer(s)	Length
1.	"Belfast Child" (edit)
2.	"Mandela Day" (edit)
3.	"This Is Your Land" (edit)
4.	"Saturday Girl"
5.	"Year of the Dragon"
6.	"This Is Your Land" (DJ Version)
7.	"Kick It In" (edit)
8.	"Waterfront" (’89 remix)
9.	"Big Sleep" (live)
10.	"Kick It In" (Unauthorised Mix)
11.	"Sign o' the Times" (edit)	Prince
12.	"Let It All Come Down" (edit)
13.	"Sign o' the Times"	Prince
14.	"Jerusalem"	words: William Blake; music: Hubert Parry
15.	"Sign o' the Times" (C.J. Mackintosh Remix)	Prince

Deluxe Edition Disc 3: Verona part 1
No.	Title	Length
1.	"Theme For Great Cities '90"	3:07
2.	"When Spirits Rise"	2:23
3.	"Street Fighting Years" (live)	7:36
4.	"Mandela Day" (live)	8:30
5.	"This Is Your Land" (live)	8:34
6.	"Soul Crying Out" (live)	7:55
7.	"Waterfront" (live)	5:26
8.	"Ghost Dancing" (live)	7:41
9.	"Book of Brilliant Things" (live)	4:53
10.	"Don’t You (Forget About Me)" (live)	8:58
Total length:		65:03

Deluxe Edition Disc 4: Verona part 2
No.	Title	Writer(s)	Length
1.	"Gaelic Melody" (live)	Traditional	6:04
2.	"Kick It In" (live)		6:50
3.	"Let It All Come Down" (live)		5:34
4.	"Belfast Child" (live)		9:50
5.	"Sun City" (live)	Little Steven	5:36
6.	"Biko" (live)	Peter Gabriel	9:43
7.	"Sanctify Yourself" (live)		6:34
8.	"East at Easter" (live)		6:14
9.	"Alive and Kicking" (live)		7:16
Total length:			63:41

== Personnel ==
Simple Minds

- Jim Kerr – lead vocals
- Charlie Burchill – acoustic and electric guitars
- Mick MacNeil – piano, accordion, keyboards
- John Giblin – fretted and fretless bass guitar, double bass (1)
- Mel Gaynor – drums (3, 8, 10)

Additional musicians

- Stephen Lipson – additional bass guitar, producer
- Manu Katché – drums (1, 2, 9)
- Stewart Copeland – LinnDrum programming (uncredited) (4, 6)
- Leroy Williams – percussion (1, 2, 8, 9, 10)
- Sidney Thiam – additional percussion
- Abdul M'boup – additional percussion
- Maureen Kerr – penny whistle, bodhran
- Roger Sharp – bagpipes
- Lisa Germano – violin (1, 4, 9)
- William Lithgow – cello
- Sheena McKenzie – cello
- John Altman – orchestral arrangements
- Lou Reed – additional lead vocals on "This Is Your Land"
- Lorna Bannon – backing vocals

Studio personnel

- Dougie Cowan – technical master
- Robin Hancock – engineer
- Guido Harari – photography
- Simon Heyworth – mastering
- Trevor Horn – producer
- Paul Kerr – logistics
- Stephen Lewis – talking
- Bob Ludwig – mastering
- Heff Moraes – engineer
- Martin Plant – assistant engineer
- Steve Ralbovsky – talking
- Willie P. Richardson – talking
- Danton Supple – assistant engineer
- Jane Ventom – coordination
- Gary Wathen – talking
- Ying Ho Au Yeung – catering

== Charts ==
=== Weekly charts ===
Chart (1989)	Peak position
Australian Albums (ARIA)	11
Austrian Albums (Ö3 Austria)	3
Canada Top Albums/CDs (RPM)	24
Dutch Albums (Album Top 100)	1
Finnish Albums (The Official Finnish Charts)	10
German Albums (Offizielle Top 100)	1
New Zealand Albums (RMNZ)	4
Norwegian Albums (VG-lista)	4
Swedish Albums (Sverigetopplistan)	4
Swiss Albums (Schweizer Hitparade)	1
UK Albums (Official Charts)	1
US Billboard 200	70

Chart (2020)	Peak position
Belgian Albums (Ultratop Flanders)	77
Belgian Albums (Ultratop Wallonia)	37
Spanish Albums (Promusicae)	84

=== Year-end charts ===
Chart (1989)	Position
Austrian Albums (Ö3 Austria)	24
Dutch Albums (Album Top 100)	13
German Albums (Offizielle Top 100)	4
Swiss Albums (Schweizer Hitparade)	9
UK Albums (OCC)	18

=== Singles ===
Single	Chart (1989)	Position
"Belfast Child"	UK Singles Chart	1
"This Is Your Land"	UK Singles Chart	13
"This Is Your Land"	US Modern Rock Tracks	12
"This Is Your Land"	US Billboard Mainstream Rock	37
"Kick It In"	UK Singles Chart	15
The Amsterdam EP	UK Singles Chart	18
"Mandela Day"	US Modern Rock Tracks	17
"Take a Step Back"	US Modern Rock Tracks	14

== Certifications and sales ==
Region	Certification	Certified units/sales
Australia (ARIA)	Gold	60,000
Canada (Music Canada)	Gold	50,000^{^}
France (SNEP)	Platinum	300,000^{*}
Germany (BVMI)	Platinum	500,000^{^}
Italy sales in 1989	—	400,000
Netherlands (NVPI)	Platinum	100,000^{^}
Spain (Promusicae)	Gold	50,000^{^}
Sweden (GLF)	Gold	50,000^{^}
Switzerland (IFPI Switzerland)	Platinum	50,000^{^}
United Kingdom (BPI)	2× Platinum	600,000^{^}
Summaries
Europe	—	2,000,000
^{*} Sales figures based on certification alone.^{^} Shipments figures based on certification alone.
