= Speed Your Love to Me =

Single by Simple Minds

from the album Sparkle in the Rain
- B-side: "Bass Line"
- Released: 9 January 1984
- Recorded: September 1983
- Genre: New wave, arena rock
- Length: 3:59
- Label: Virgin
- Songwriter(s): Jim Kerr, Charlie Burchill, Derek Forbes, Mel Gaynor, Mick MacNeil
- Producer(s): Steve Lillywhite

Simple Minds singles chronology
"Waterfront" (1983)	"Speed Your Love to Me" (1984)	"Up on the Catwalk" (1984)

"Speed Your Love to Me" is a song by Simple Minds, which was released as the second single from the album Sparkle in the Rain on 9 January 1984. It quickly reached number 20 in the UK Singles Chart, and remained in the charts for 4 weeks.

== Style ==
Much like its predecessor in the charts, "Waterfront", "Speed Your Love to Me" was a stadium-oriented rock song with heavy drums and the keyboards playing a more subtle role. Dave Thompson of Allmusic describes the song as "arena rock" with the keyboards "bubbling through the crash and clash" of the drums and guitars rather than guiding the song from the forefront.

Kirsty Maccoll, who was a friend of the band, sings backing vocals on the song. The title of the song was lifted from the line "God speed your love to me" in the song "Unchained Melody" performed by the Righteous Brothers".

== Music video ==
Music video featuring Jim Kerr 'flying over' over fast paced images of the Erskine Bridge

A promotional video was completed for the single on 6 December 1983, which was a cinematic composition of studio performances and scenic images. The fan website Dream Giver Redux describes how fast-moving clips of moving through roads and tunnels in urban Glasgow coincides with the chorus "Run till we come, until we be/Speed your love to me". These projections of the Clyde Tunnel, Kingston Bridge and Erskine Bridge expand into aerial perspectives of the Firth of Clyde and Loch Lomond as Jim Kerr sings "higher and higher" while the camera 'takes off'. Clips of the band performing in a studio connect these narratives together.

== Track listing ==
=== 7" single ===
- Virgin VS 649
1. "Speed Your Love to Me" – 3:59
2. "Bass Line" – 4:35

=== 12" single ===
- Virgin VS 649-12
1. "Speed Your Love to Me" (Extended Mix) – 7:29
2. "Speed Your Love to Me" – 3:59
3. "Bass Line" – 4:35

The album version of the song is slightly longer, at 4:25. "Bass Line" is an instrumental version of "White Hot Day", the seventh song of Sparkle in the Rain.
