= Let There Be Love (Simple Minds song) =

1991 single by Simple Minds

Single by Simple Minds

from the album Real Life
- B-side: "Good Night"
- Released: 11 March 1991
- Length: 4:44
- Label: Virgin
- Songwriters: Charlie Burchill, Jim Kerr
- Producer: Stephen Lipson

Simple Minds singles chronology
"The Amsterdam EP" (1989)	"Let There Be Love" (1991)	"See the Lights" (1991)

"Let There Be Love" is a song by Scottish rock band Simple Minds and first single from their ninth studio album, Real Life (1991). The song was written by Charlie Burchill and Jim Kerr and released by Virgin Records on 11 March 1991, with the twelve-inch single and CD single including a live rendition of "Alive and Kicking".

During the week of 30 March 1991, "Let There Be Love" was added to 22 European hit radio stations that week, which at that point was the greatest number of weekly adds in that format for 1991. The song became an international hit, reaching the top 10 in Ireland, Denmark, Belgium, Greece, the Netherlands, Sweden, Switzerland, and the United Kingdom. It was the most successful in Italy, where it peaked at number one. The official music video for the song was directed by Andy Morahan.

Alan Jones of Music Week designated the song as their pick of the week for the 16 March 1991 edition of the publication and called it a "brilliant return to chart duty after an absence of more than a year."

== Track listings ==
- 7-inch and cassette single
1. "Let There Be Love" (7-inch mix) – 4:44
2. "Good Night" – 3:10
- 12-inch single
1. "Let There Be Love" (extended mix) – 8:15
2. "Good Night" – 3:10
3. "Let There Be Love" (7-inch mix) – 4:44
4. "Alive and Kicking" (live, Verona 1989) – 3:51
- CD single
1. "Let There Be Love" (7-inch mix) – 4:44
2. "Good Night" – 3:10
3. "Let There Be Love" (extended mix) – 8:15
4. "Alive and Kicking" (live, Verona 1989) – 3:51
- CD single + collectors box
1. "Let There Be Love" (edited album mix) – 4:24
2. "Let There Be Love" (extended mix) – 8:15
3. "East at Easter" (live, Verona 1989) – 6:12

== Personnel ==
- Written by Burchill & Kerr, except "Alive and Kicking" and "East at Easter" written by Simple Minds
- Mixed by Julian Mendelsohn
- Edited by Moraes, Mendelsohn and Lipson
- "Alive and Kicking" and "East at Easter" recorded Live at L'Arena, Verona 14/15 September 1989 by the Fleetwood Mobile
- Published by Virgin Music Publishers Ltd. except "Alive and Kicking"
- Published by EMI Music Publishing Ltd

== Charts ==
=== Weekly charts ===
Chart (1991)	Peak position
Australia (ARIA)	15
Belgium (Ultratop 50 Flanders)	4
Denmark (IFPI)	7
Europe (Eurochart Hot 100)	9
Europe (European Hit Radio)	3
France (SNEP)	23
Germany (GfK)	16
Greece (IFPI)	10
Ireland (IRMA)	5
Italy (Musica e dischi)	1
Netherlands (Dutch Top 40)	4
Netherlands (Single Top 100)	7
New Zealand (Recorded Music NZ)	48
Spain (AFYVE)	14
Sweden (Sverigetopplistan)	9
Switzerland (Schweizer Hitparade)	7
UK Singles (OCC)	6
UK Airplay (Music Week)	9

=== Year-end charts ===
Chart (1991)	Position
Belgium (Ultratop)	63
Europe (Europchart Hot 100)	50
Europe (European Hit Radio)	20
Germany (Media Control)	81
Netherlands (Dutch Top 40)	47
Netherlands (Single Top 100)	54
Sweden (Topplistan)	56

== Sales ==
Region	Certification	Certified units/sales
United Kingdom	—	104,672

== Release history ==
Region	Date	Format(s)	Label(s)	Ref.
United Kingdom	11 March 1991	12-inch vinyl; CD	Virgin	
Australia	1 April 1991	7-inch vinyl; 12-inch vinyl; CD; cassette	Virgin	
Japan	21 April 1991	Mini-CD	Virgin	
