= Mandela Day (song) =

Song by Simple Minds

from the album Street Fighting Years
- A-side: "Belfast Child"
- Released: 6 February 1989
- Genre: Alternative rock, Irish folk, World music
- Length: 5:42
- Label: A&M
- Songwriters: Jim Kerr, Charlie Burchill, Mick MacNeil

Simple Minds singles chronology
"Don't You (Forget About Me)" (1988)	"Mandela Day" (1989)	"This Is Your Land" (1989)

"Mandela Day" is a song by Scottish rock band Simple Minds. It was included on the Ballad of the Streets EP which reached No.1 on the British charts in February 1989 and features on their eighth studio album Street Fighting Years (1989). The single highlights the songs "Mandela Day", "Belfast Child", originally its A-side on the full-length version, and "Biko".

"Mandela Day" was written for the Nelson Mandela 70th Birthday Tribute (also known as Mandela Day), a concert held at Wembley Stadium, London, on 11 June 1988, as an expression of solidarity with the then-imprisoned Nelson Mandela, and was played live on that day (alongside "Sun City" with Little Steven and "Biko" with Peter Gabriel).

The official music video for the song was directed by Andy Morahan.

== Track listings ==
=== 7" vinyl ===
- UK, Germany: Virgin / SMX 3
- France: Virgin / 90496

Side one
No.	Title	Writer(s)	Length
1.	"Belfast Child"	Traditional music, lyrics by Simple Minds	6:39

Side two
No.	Title	Writer(s)	Length
2.	"Mandela Day"	Simple Minds	5:42

=== 12" vinyl ===
- UK: Virgin / SMXT 3
- UK: Virgin / SMX BS (limited edition box set, including 4 black-and-white photographs from the music video)
- France: Virgin / 80432
- Germany: Virgin / 611 998
- Yugoslavia: Jugoton /MXSVIRG 18016

Side one
No.	Title	Writer(s)	Length
1.	"Belfast Child"	Traditional music, lyrics by Simple Minds	6:39

Side two
No.	Title	Writer(s)	Length
2.	"Mandela Day"	Simple Minds	5:42
3.	"Biko"	Peter Gabriel	7:31

=== CD ===
- UK: Virgin / SMXCD3 (3")
- UK: Virgin / SMXCDT3 (5")

No.	Title	Writer(s)	Length
1.	"Belfast Child"	Traditional music, lyrics by Simple Minds	6:39
2.	"Mandela Day"	Simple Minds	5:42
3.	"Biko"	Peter Gabriel	7:31

== Charts ==
=== Weekly charts ===
Chart (1989)	Peak position
Italy Airplay (Music & Media)	12

== See also ==
- Nelson Mandela
- Nelson Mandela 70th Birthday Tribute (also known Mandela Day)
