= See the Lights =

1991 single by Simple Minds

Single by Simple Minds

from the album Real Life
- B-side: "Theme for Great Cities '91"
- Released: 13 May 1991
- Length: 4:22
- Label: Virgin
- Songwriters: Charlie Burchill; Jim Kerr
- Producer: Stephen Lipson

Simple Minds singles chronology
"Let There Be Love" (1991)	"See the Lights" (1991)	"Stand by Love" (1991)

"See the Lights" is the second single released from Scottish rock band Simple Minds' ninth studio album, Real Life (1991). Written by band members Charlie Burchill and Jim Kerr, the song was released on 13 May 1991, by Virgin Records, and became a top-40 hit in six countries. It reached number 20 in the United Kingdom, number 10 in Canada, and number 40 in the United States. It also went to number one on the US Billboard Modern Rock Tracks chart and number 10 on the Billboard Album Rock Tracks chart. It was Simple Minds' fifth and final song to reach the top 40 in the US.

== Track listings ==
- 7-inch and cassette single
1. "See the Lights" (7-inch mix)
2. "Theme for Great Cities '91"
- 12-inch single
1. "See the Lights" (12-inch mix)
2. "Theme for Great Cities '91"
- CD single
1. "See the Lights" (7-inch mix)
2. "Theme for Great Cities '91"
3. "See the Lights" (12-inch mix)

== Charts ==
=== Weekly charts ===
Weekly chart performance for "See the Lights"
Chart (1991)	Peak position
Australia (ARIA)	100
Canada Top Singles (RPM)	10
Denmark (IFPI)	10
Europe (Eurochart Hot 100)	45
Europe (European Hit Radio)	12
Ireland (IRMA)	16
Italy (Musica e dischi)	8
Netherlands (Single Top 100)	42
Sweden (Sverigetopplistan)	27
UK Singles (Official Charts)	20
UK Airplay (Music Week)	1
US Billboard Hot 100	40
US Alternative Airplay (Billboard)	1
US Mainstream Rock (Billboard)	10
US Cash Box Top 100	43

=== Year-end charts ===
Year-end chart performance for "See the Lights"
Chart (1991)	Position
Canada Top Singles (RPM)	95
Europe (European Hit Radio)	98
US Modern Rock Tracks (Billboard)	7

== Release history ==
Release dates and formats for "See the Lights"
Region	Date	Format(s)	Label(s)	Ref.
United Kingdom	13 May 1991	7-inch vinyl; 12-inch vinyl	Virgin	
Australia	24 June 1991	7-inch vinyl; 12-inch vinyl; CD; cassette	Virgin	
