= Stand by Love =

Single by Simple Minds

from the album Real Life
- Released: 12 August 1991
- Genre: Pop rock
- Length: 4:09
- Label: Virgin
- Songwriters: Charlie Burchill; Jim Kerr
- Producer: Stephen Lipson

Simple Minds singles chronology
"See the Lights" (1991)	"Stand by Love" (1991)	"Real Life" (1991)

"Stand by Love" is a song by the Scottish rock band Simple Minds. It was released in August 1991 by Virgin Records as the third single from their ninth studio album, Real Life (1991). The song was written by bandmembers Charlie Burchill and Jim Kerr and was produced by Stephen Lipson. It peaked at number 13 in the UK.

== Track listings ==
- 7" single
1. "Stand by Love" - 4:09
2. "King Is White & in the Crowd" (live, Los Angeles, 19.06.91) – 4:21
- 12" and CD single
1. "Stand by Love" – 4:09
2. "King Is White & in the Crowd" (live, Los Angeles, 19.06.91) – 4:21
3. "Let There Be Love" (live, Los Angeles, 19.06.91) – 5:22
- Cassette single
1. "Stand by Love" (live, Glasgow, 13.08.91) – 4:26
2. "Someone Somewhere in Summertime" (live, Glasgow, 13.08.91) – 5:34
3. "Banging on the Door" (live, Glasgow, 13.08.91) – 5:45

== Charts ==
Chart performance for "Stand by Love"
Chart (1991)	Peak position
Australia (ARIA)	70
Belgium (Ultratop 50 Flanders)	38
Europe (European Hit Radio)	17
Ireland (IRMA)	14
Netherlands (Single Top 100)	25
Sweden (Sverigetopplistan)	39
Switzerland (Schweizer Hitparade)	27
UK Singles (OCC)	13
UK Airplay (Music Week)	7
US Alternative Airplay (Billboard)	4
