= Themes – Volume 2: August 82–April 85 =

Themes – Volume 2: August 82 – April 85

Box set by Simple Minds
- Released: 17 September 1990
- Genre: Rock
- Label: Virgin

Simple Minds chronology
Themes – Volume 1: March 79–April 82 (1990)	Themes – Volume 2: August 82 – April 85 (1990)	Themes – Volume 3: September 85–June 87 (1990)

Professional ratings
Review scores
Source	Rating
AllMusic	2/5 stars
Melody Maker	(mixed)
Q	4/5 stars

Themes – Volume 2: August 82 – April 85 is box set released by Simple Minds. It was released on 17 September 1990 by Virgin Records.

== Track listing ==
Theme 6 – Glittering Prize
No.	Title	Length
1.	"Glittering Prize" (Club Mix)	4.59
2.	"New Gold Dream" (12″ Remix)	6.52
3.	"Glittering Prize" (Extended Theme)	4.59

Theme 7 – Someone Somewhere in Summertime
No.	Title	Length
1.	"Someone Somewhere in Summertime (Note: Meant to be the extended mix from the 12″ but the album version was included by mistake.)"	4.35
2.	"King Is White and in the Crowd" (Session Version (Note: Released by arrangement with BBC Records.))	5.12
3.	"Soundtrack for Every Heaven"	4.57

Theme 8 – Waterfront
No.	Title	Length
1.	"Waterfront" (Extended Version)	5.50
2.	"Hunter and the Hunted (Note: Recorded live at Newcastle City Hall 20 November 1982 on the Manor Mobile.)"	6.00
3.	"'C' Moon Cry Like a Baby"	4.23

Theme 9 – Speed Your Love to Me
No.	Title	Length
1.	"Speed Your Love to Me" (Extended Version)	7.29
2.	"Speed Your Love to Me" (Single Edit)	3.59
3.	"Bassline"	4.35

Theme 10 – Don't You Forget About Me/Up on the Catwalk
No.	Title	Length
1.	"Don't You Forget About Me" (Extended Version)	6.32
2.	"Up on the Catwalk" (Extended Version)	7.34
3.	"A Brass Band in African Chimes"	9.22
