= Lostboy! AKA Jim Kerr =

Studio album by Lostboy! AKA Jim Kerr
- Released: 17 May 2010
- Recorded: September–December 2009 (most of the writing and initial recording); January 2010 (backing vocals and percussion); February 2010 (final mix)
- Genre: Rock
- Length: 47:38 (60:17 with bonus tracks)
- Label: Earmusic
- Producer: Jez Coad

Lostboy! AKA Jim Kerr is the first solo album by Simple Minds front-man Jim Kerr, released on 17 May 2010. The album entered the UK charts at No. 94 on 29 May 2010 and UK Independent Chart at No. 8. The album also made the charts in some other European countries, most notably Germany, Italy, France and Belgium.

== Overview ==
The album was released in five different formats; the 11-track standard CD-version, the 14-track limited edition CD, the collector's edition (11-track CD + 2-track bonus 7" vinyl), 11-track LP and 11-track digital download.

== Second Lostboy album ==
Kerr planned a second Lostboy album for which he wrote a large number of songs, amongst which were "Broken Glass Park", "Blood Diamonds", "Honest Town", "Kill or Cure", "Spirited Away", "Sense of Discovery" and "Summer". However, the plans were cancelled and the tracks were repurposed for the Simple Minds releases Big Music (2014) and Walk Between Worlds (2018). Other songs, such as "Spirit Catcher", were played live but never released.

== Singles ==
=== "Shadowland" ===
"Shadowland" was released as the first single from the album. The album version of the song was made available to listen as an audio stream on 13 March 2010. A new remix, more suitable for radio airplay, was done by Cenzo Townshend whom Jim Kerr chose because of Townshends's previous work with Simple Minds' latest album Graffiti Soul. A promotional single with the new radio mixes of the song was shipped to radio stations on 4 April 2010.
"Shadowland" was originally meant to be released as a commercial physical release, but it was eventually only released as a download single on 9 May 2010. The three tracks on the download single were the same three tracks previously available on the "Shadowland" radio promo single.

=== "Refugee" ===
The album version of "Refugee" was premiered on Billy Sloan's show on 7 March 2010. A week later (16 March 2010), and the full album version of "Refugee" was made available as a download from the initial www.lostboyaka.com website. On 13 April 2010 "Refugee" was released as the lead track of the Welcome Gift 1 free download twin pack which was released as part of the main website launch of www.lostboyaka.com. In addition to the previously released album version of "Refugee", the free download twin pack included the track "What Goes On" (Scary Monsters Mix), which was exclusive to this release. The package also included the artwork and a text file requesting that the tracks not be uploaded to any other site.

=== "She Fell in Love with Silence" ===
"She Fell in Love with Silence" was released as a single on 15 August 2010. The single was released in both digital and physical formats.

== Track listing ==
1. "Refugee" – 4:11
2. "She Fell in Love with Silence" – 4:32
3. "Shadowland" – 4:08
4. "Return of the King" – 3:48
5. "Red Letter Day" – 4:20
6. "Remember Asia" – 3:47
7. "Bulletproof Heart" (cover of the Silencers) – 4:32
8. "Lostboy" – 3:50
9. "Nail Through My Heart" – 5:12
10. "Soloman Solohead" – 3:27
11. "The Wait Parts 1+2" – 5:51
12. "Mr. Silversmith" – 4:19 (bonus track)
13. "Karma to This Rain" – 4:19 (bonus track)
14. "Sad Stone Child" – 4:01 (bonus track)
15. "Jet Black the Night" – 4:14 (bonus 7" A-side)
16. "What Goes On" – 5:07 (bonus 7" B-side)
17. "Refugee" (Atmoxic Remix) – 4:16 (digital only bonus track)

Notes

- The three bonus tracks are included on the limited deluxe CD edition of the album.
- "Jet Black the Night" and "What Goes On" were the A-side and B-side of the bonus 7" included with the special edition of the album.

== Charts ==
Chart performance for Lostboy! AKA Jim Kerr
Chart (2010)	Peak position
Belgian Albums (Ultratop Flanders)	46
Belgian Albums (Ultratop Wallonia)	14
French Albums (SNEP)	149
German Albums (Offizielle Top 100)	60
Italian Albums (FIMI)	46
UK Albums Chart	94
UK Independent Chart	8
