= Nelson Mandela: An International Tribute for a Free South Africa =

1990 music concert in Wembley Stadium, London

Coordinates: 51°33′21.9″N 0°16′44.7″W

Nelson Mandela: An International Tribute for a Free South Africa was a music concert that took place on 16 April 1990 at Wembley Stadium in London, England. The event was held before a capacity audience of 76,000 people and was broadcast to more than 60 countries. It was held two months after Nelson Mandela's release from a South African apartheid prison and was regarded by him as an official international reception.

== Background ==
An earlier concert, the Nelson Mandela 70th Birthday Tribute, had been successfully held in June 1988 while the South African leader was still imprisoned. The success of this event, combined with the growing likelihood of Mandela's release, prompted his lawyer to ask Tony Hollingsworth, producer of the first concert, to organise the 1990 tribute concert.

Mandela, his party, the African National Congress, and the Anti-Apartheid Movement (AAM) were convinced that the first event increased global pressure on the South African regime to release Mandela—a move that would be the first step in releasing other political prisoners and ending the apartheid regime.

Mandela's lawyer and Mike Terry, the Executive Secretary of the AAM, met with Hollingsworth in London in December 1989. The London-based AAM, which was formed in 1959 as a boycott committee, was led by Terry from 1975 and was a key organiser of the concert. According to his lawyer, Mandela insisted on two conditions: that he would be able to speak for any length of time and that his speech would not be edited for television. It was also agreed that they would seek the widest possible international television coverage, and that broadcast fees and ticket revenue would be used to cover the concert's costs rather than generate profit.

At one stage, Mandela considered disassociating himself from the planned concert after senior ANC figures persuaded him against holding the event in "Thatcher's country", as they believed that British Prime Minister Margaret Thatcher had supported the apartheid regime. Archbishop Trevor Huddleston, president of the Anti-Apartheid Movement, eventually persuaded him to participate.

== Event ==
Mandela was on stage for 45 minutes, receiving a standing ovation that lasted for eight minutes. During his speech, he thanked the "hundreds of thousands of people" who had campaigned for his freedom and called for the continued isolation of South Africa until it was transformed into a "non-racial democracy". He also urged people across the world to continue pressing for the abolition of apartheid through sanctions.

== Artist line-up ==
The following artists performed at the concert:

- Anita Baker
- Aswad
- Ben Elton
- Bonnie Raitt
- Caiphus Semenya
- Chrissie Hynde
- Daniel Lanois
- Denzel Washington
- Dudu Pukwana
- Geoffrey Oryema
- George Duke
- Jackson Browne
- Jerry Dammers
- Johnny Clegg
- Jonas Gwangwa
- Jungle Brothers
- Lenny Henry
- Letta Mbulu
- Lou Reed
- Manhattan Brothers
- Mica Paris
- Natalie Cole
- Neil Young
- Neneh Cherry
- Neville Brothers
- Patti LaBelle
- Peter Gabriel
- Shikisha
- Simple Minds
- Stetsasonic
- Steven Van Zandt
- Terence Trent D'Arby
- Tracy Chapman
- Youssou N’Dour
