= Belfast Child =

1989 single by Simple Minds

Single by Simple Minds

from the album Street Fighting Years
- B-side: "Mandela Day"; "Biko"
- Released: 6 February 1989
- Genre: Progressive folk
- Length: 6:39
- Label: Virgin
- Composer: Traditional
- Lyricists: Simple Minds (Jim Kerr, Charlie Burchill, Mick MacNeil)
- Producers: Trevor Horn; Stephen Lipson

Simple Minds singles chronology
"Don't You (Forget About Me)" (1988)	"Belfast Child" (1989)	"This Is Your Land" (1989)

"Belfast Child" is a song by the Scottish band Simple Minds, first released as the lead track on the Ballad of the Streets EP on 6 February 1989. The EP also included "Mandela Day" and "Biko". The record reached number one on the UK Singles Chart as well as in Ireland and the Netherlands, and it became a top-10 hit in Belgium, New Zealand, Norway, Spain, Switzerland and West Germany.

== Style and influence ==
The song uses the music from the Irish folk song "She Moved Through the Fair", with different words.

Jim Kerr recalled in 1000 UK Number 1 Hits why he used the melody, "I first heard the melody [of She Moved Through The Fair] a few days after the Enniskillen bombing, and like everybody when you see the images I was sick. In the second part of the song, I'm trying to relate to people in Northern Ireland who lost loved ones. I'm trying to talk about the madness, the sadness and the emptiness. I'm not saying I have any pearls of wisdom, but I have a few questions to ask".

== Critical reception ==
The song received rave reviews, receiving a five-star review in Q magazine. In a retrospective review of the single, AllMusic journalist Dave Thompson described "Belfast Child" as being "an epic, heartstring-tugging song. The piece gains even more power in its second half, when the drums and guitar kick in, and the arrangement billows out with instrumentation."

== Music video ==
The music video to the song was shot in black and white and displays footage of children and deprivation in Belfast. It was directed by Andy Morahan and edited by Mark Alchin.

== B-sides ==
The B-side of the single was "Mandela Day", a song recorded to commemorate and performed at the Nelson Mandela 70th Birthday Tribute concert on 11 June 1988 though not released commercially until its inclusion on this single. The CD single and the 12" editions added a cover of Peter Gabriel's "Biko". All three tracks appeared on the band's Street Fighting Years album, released three months later.

== Track listings ==
7-inch vinyl

- UK, Germany: Virgin / SMX 3
- France: Virgin / 90496

Side one
No.	Title	Writer(s)	Length
1.	"Belfast Child"	Traditional music, lyrics by Simple Minds	6:39

Side two
No.	Title	Writer(s)	Length
2.	"Mandela Day"	Simple Minds	5:42

12-inch vinyl

- UK: Virgin / SMXT 3
- UK: Virgin / SMX BS (limited edition box set, including 4 black-and-white photographs from the music video)
- France: Virgin / 80432
- Germany: Virgin / 611 998
- Yugoslavia: Jugoton /MXSVIRG 18016

Side one
No.	Title	Writer(s)	Length
1.	"Belfast Child"	Traditional music, lyrics by Simple Minds	6:39

Side two
No.	Title	Writer(s)	Length
2.	"Mandela Day"	Simple Minds	5:42
3.	"Biko"	Peter Gabriel	7:31

CD

- UK: Virgin / SMXCD3 (3-inch)
- UK: Virgin / SMXCDT3 (5-inch)

No.	Title	Writer(s)	Length
1.	"Belfast Child"	Traditional music, lyrics by Simple Minds	6:39
2.	"Mandela Day"	Simple Minds	5:42
3.	"Biko"	Peter Gabriel	7:31

== Charts ==
=== Weekly charts ===
Chart (1989)	Peak position
Australia (ARIA)	12
Austria (Ö3 Austria Top 40)	12
Belgium (Ultratop 50 Flanders)	2
Europe (Eurochart Hot 100)	1
France (SNEP)	20
Greece	2
Ireland (IRMA)	1
Italy (Musica e dischi)	2
Italy Airplay (Music & Media)	17
Netherlands (Dutch Top 40)	1
Netherlands (Single Top 100)	1
New Zealand (Recorded Music NZ)	8
Norway (VG-lista)	9
Spain (AFYVE)	8
Sweden (Sverigetopplistan)	11
Switzerland (Schweizer Hitparade)	3
UK Singles (Official Charts)	1
West Germany (GfK)	3

=== Year-end charts ===
Chart (1989)	Position
Australia (ARIA)	66
Belgium (Ultratop)	33
Europe (Eurochart Hot 100)	17
Netherlands (Dutch Top 40)	14
Netherlands (Single Top 100)	9
New Zealand (RIANZ)	49
Switzerland (Schweizer Hitparade)	17
UK Singles (OCC)	26
West Germany (Media Control)	19

== Certifications and sales ==
Region	Certification	Certified units/sales
Italy	—	30,000
United Kingdom (BPI)	Silver	200,000^{^}
^{^} Shipments figures based on certification alone.
