= Themes – Volume 3: September 85–June 87 =

Themes – Volume 3: September 85 – June 87

Box set by Simple Minds
- Released: 8 October 1990
- Genre: Rock
- Label: Virgin

Simple Minds chronology
| Themes – Volume 2: August 82–April 85 (1990) | Themes – Volume 3: September 85 – June 87 (1990) | Themes – Volume 4: February 89–May 90 (1990) |

Professional ratings
Review scores
| Source | Rating |
|---|---|
| AllMusic | 2/5 stars |
| Q | 4/5 stars |

Themes – Volume 3: September 85 – June 87 is box set released by Simple Minds. It was released on 8 October 1990 by Virgin Records

== Track listing ==
Theme 11 – Alive and Kicking
| No. | Title | Length |
|---|---|---|
| 1. | "Alive and Kicking" | 5.25 |
| 2. | "Alive and Kicking" (Instrumental Version) | 6.01 |
| 3. | "Up on the Catwalk (Note: Recorded live at Barrowlands, Glasgow on 5.1.85.)" | 5.37 |

Theme 12 – Sanctify Yourself
| No. | Title | Length |
|---|---|---|
| 1. | "Sanctify Yourself" (Extended Mix) | 7.09 |
| 2. | "Sanctify Yourself" (dub) | 6.10 |
| 3. | "Love Song (Note: Recorded live at the Ahoy, Rotterdam on 3.12.85.)" | 5.41 |
| 4. | "Street Hassle" | 7.25 |

Theme 13 – All the Things She Said
| No. | Title | Length |
|---|---|---|
| 1. | "All the Things She Said" (Extended Remix) | 5.09 |
| 2. | "Promised You a Miracle" (US Club Mix) | 5.57 |
| 3. | "Don't You Forget About Me" | 9.05 |

Theme 14 – Ghost Dancing
| No. | Title | Length |
|---|---|---|
| 1. | "Ghost Dancing" (Extended Remix) | 6.58 |
| 2. | "Ghost Dancing" (Instrumental Version) | 4.55 |
| 3. | "Jungleland" (Extended Remix) | 6.55 |
| 4. | "Jungleland" (Instrumental Version) | 6.09 |

Theme 15 – Promised You a Miracle – Live
| No. | Title | Length |
|---|---|---|
| 1. | "Promised You a Miracle (Note: Recorded live at Le Zénith, Paris on 12.08.86.)" | 4.55 |
| 2. | "Book of Brilliant Things" | 4.54 |
| 3. | "Glittering Prize" | 4.34 |
| 4. | "Celebrate" | 5.49 |
