= Themes – Volume 1: March 79–April 82 =

Themes – Volume 1: March 79 – April 82

Box set by Simple Minds
- Released: 8 October 1990
- Genre: Rock
- Label: Virgin

Simple Minds chronology
Street Fighting Years (1989)	Themes – Volume 1: March 79 – April 82 (1990)	Themes – Volume 2: August 82–April 85 (1990)

Professional ratings
Whole series
Review scores
Source	Rating
AllMusic	3/5 stars
Mojo	4/5 stars

Professional ratings
Volume 1
Review scores
Source	Rating
AllMusic	2.5/5 stars
Melody Maker	(mixed)
Q	3/5 stars

Themes – Volume 1: March 79 – April 82 is box set released by Simple Minds. It was released on 8 October 1990 by Virgin Records. It documented the band's developing sound, ideas and ideals through their classic 12″ single releases.

== Track listing ==
Theme 1 – I Travel
No.	Title	Length
1.	"I Travel" (Extended)	6:20
2.	"Celebrate"	5:06
3.	"Film Theme"	2:25

Theme 2 – The American
No.	Title	Length
1.	"The American" (Extended)	6:59
2.	"League of Nations"	5:00
3.	"Sound in 70 Cities"	5:04

Theme 3 – Love Song
No.	Title	Length
1.	"Love Song"	5:05
2.	"This Earth That You Walk Upon (Note: Meant to be the instrumental mix from the 12″ but the album version was included by mistake.)"	5:26
3.	"Life in a Day"	4:00

Theme 4 – Sweat in Bullet
No.	Title	Length
1.	"Sweat in Bullet" (Extended Remix)	6:59
2.	"20th Century Promised Land"	4:55
3.	"League of Nations (Note: Recorded live at the Hammersmith Odeon on 25 September 1981 by the Manor Mobile.)"	6:15
4.	"In Trance as Mission"	7:21

Theme 5 – Promised You a Miracle
No.	Title	Length
1.	"Promised You a Miracle" (Extended)	4:49
2.	"Theme for Great Cities"	5:51
3.	"Seeing Out the Angel" (Instrumental Remix)	6:32
