= Kick It In =

Single by Simple Minds

from the album Street Fighting Years
- B-side: "Waterfront ['89 Remix]"; "Big Sleep [Live]"; "Kick It In [Unauthorised Mix]"
- Released: 17 July 1989
- Genre: Pop rock, electronica
- Length: 6:11
- Label: Virgin
- Songwriters: Jim Kerr, Charlie Burchill and Mick MacNeil
- Producers: Trevor Horn; Stephen Lipson

Simple Minds singles chronology
"Take a Step Back" (1989)	"Kick It In" (1989)	"The Amsterdam EP" (1989)

"Kick It In" is the third single from the 1989 Simple Minds album Street Fighting Years. The song reached the UK Top 20, peaking at #15.

The official music video for the song was directed by Andy Morahan.

== Track listings ==
7" & Cassette Single

1. "Kick It In" [7" Mix] - 4:44
2. "Waterfront" ['89 Remix] - 5:24

12" & CD Single

1. "Kick It In" - 6:11
2. "Waterfront" ['89 Remix] - 5:24
3. "Big Sleep" [Live in Rehearsal, Dublin 1989] - 6:39

Limited Edition 12" Gatefold Sleeve + Double Sided Poster

1. "Kick It In" - 6:11
2. "Waterfront" ['89 Remix] - 5:24
3. "Kick It In" [Unauthorised Mix] - 7:02

== Charts ==
=== Weekly charts ===
Chart (1989)	Peak position
Italy Airplay (Music & Media)	1
