= This Is Your Land =

Single by Simple Minds

from the album Street Fighting Years
- B-side: "Saturday Girl"; "Year of the Dragon"
- Released: 10 April 1989
- Genre: Pop, rock, electronic
- Length: 6:18
- Label: Virgin
- Songwriters: Jim Kerr, Charlie Burchill and Mick MacNeil
- Producers: Trevor Horn; Stephen Lipson

Simple Minds singles chronology
"Belfast Child" (1989)	"This Is Your Land" (1989)	"Take a Step Back" (1989)

"This Is Your Land" is a song by Scottish rock band Simple Minds from their album Street Fighting Years, released as the second single on 10 April 1989. The song features Lou Reed as guest vocalist. The single reached #13 on the UK singles chart. The music video was shot in Spain.

== Critical reception ==
The song was praised by David Sinclair of Q magazine as part of a five-star album review given to Street Fighting Years. Sinclair wrote: "The utterly beguiling melody of 'This Is Your Land', featuring a deadpan Lou Reed, cloaks a stinging rebuke on the issue of the environment while gently leading the listener up towards the panoramic splendour of the instrumental coda."

== Track listings ==
7" Single

1. "This Is Your Land" - 6:22
2. "Saturday Girl" - 6:09

12", Cassette & CD Singles

1. This Is Your Land" - 6:22
2. Saturday Girl" - 6:09
3. "Year Of The Dragon" - 3:06

== Charts ==
=== Weekly charts ===
Chart (1989)	Peak position
Australia (ARIA)	38
Belgium (Ultratop 50 Flanders)	7
Canada Top Singles (RPM)	40
Ireland (IRMA)	6
Netherlands (Dutch Top 40)	6
Netherlands (Single Top 100)	7
New Zealand (Recorded Music NZ)	26
Sweden (Sverigetopplistan)	18
Switzerland (Schweizer Hitparade)	10
UK Singles (Official Charts)	13
US Alternative Airplay (Billboard)	12
US Mainstream Rock (Billboard)	37
West Germany (GfK)	25

=== Year-end charts ===
Chart (1989)	Position
Belgium (Ultratop Flanders)	78
Netherlands (Dutch Top 40)	74
Netherlands (Single Top 100)	83
