= Nelson Mandela 70th Birthday Tribute =

1988 popular-music concert in London

Coordinates: 51.556°N 0.280°W

- Popular-music concert by Various Artists
- Venue: Wembley Stadium, London
- Date: 11 June 1988

The Nelson Mandela 70th Birthday Tribute was a popular-music concert staged on 11 June 1988 at Wembley Stadium, London, and broadcast to 67 countries and an audience of 600 million. Marking the forthcoming 70th birthday (18 July 1988) of the imprisoned anti-apartheid revolutionary Nelson Mandela, the concert was also referred to as Freedomfest, Free Nelson Mandela Concert and Mandela Day. In the United States, the Fox television network heavily censored the political aspects of the concert. The concert is considered a notable example of anti-apartheid music.

== Planning ==
=== First of two Mandela events ===
The Birthday Tribute was regarded by many, including the Anti-Apartheid Movement (AAM) and the African National Congress (ANC), as raising worldwide consciousness of the imprisonment of ANC leader Mandela and others by the South African apartheid government and forcing the regime to release Nelson Mandela earlier than would otherwise have happened.

Eighteen months after the event, with a release now thought to be approaching, Mandela asked for the organisers of the event to create a second concert as an official international reception at which, after 27 years in prison, he would address the world. The second event, Nelson Mandela: An International Tribute for a Free South Africa, was, like the first, conceived to be shown on television across the world and was broadcast from Wembley Stadium to more than 60 countries on 16 April 1990.

The first concert, according to Robin Denselow, music critic and presenter of the BBC broadcast, writing in 1989, was the "biggest and most spectacular pop-political event of all time, a more political version of Live Aid with the aim of raising consciousness rather than just money."

=== Tony Hollingsworth ===
The organiser and risk-funder of the two events was producer and impresario Tony Hollingsworth. Hollingsworth also conceived the idea for the first event.

Hollingsworth developed the plan for the first Mandela concert after talking to singer Jerry Dammers of The Specials ska band, who had written the song "Free Nelson Mandela" in 1984 and founded the Artists Against Apartheid organisation the following year. In early 1986, Hollingsworth contacted Dammers to say that the Greater London Council, for which Hollingsworth was producing a number of festivals and concerts, might be able to fund the AAA. The authority was due to be abolished at the end of March and had spare cash to give away. But a grant turned out to be impossible because the AAA was not a legal entity and Dammers had no interest in making it one.

Hollingsworth told Dammers that he would put on an anti-apartheid concert if the singer could find a big name. Dammers did not phone back until June 1987, although in the summer of 1986 he had organised a free anti-apartheid concert, Freedom Beat, in London's Clapham Common attended by 200,000 people.

Dammers told Hollingsworth that he had received a letter from Simple Minds, the Glasgow rock band, agreeing to perform at an event which Hollingsworth had suggested for the previous year. The two agreed to go to Edinburgh, where Simple Minds were performing, to talk about a deal for a new event. Hollingsworth had in mind a major event, a birthday tribute for Mandela, who would be 70 the following year. The event would seek worldwide television and would call for his release – the first step in ending apartheid. Simple Minds was interested in the proposal but only if Hollingsworth brought in another top group.

=== Persuading the Anti-Apartheid Movement ===
At the same time, Hollingsworth started what turned out to be a series of meetings with Mike Terry, head of the Anti-Apartheid Movement in London. Also of note was the work of Robert Hughes, Baron Hughes of Woodside, who led the AAM (Anti-Apartheid Movement) at the time these concerts were organised. If the concert was to be successful, it was important to win the support of the movement and, with it, the implicit support of Mandela. But Terry and his senior officials firmly resisted Hollingsworth's proposal, insisting on three conditions, based on the policies of the African National Congress.

First, the concert must focus on all political prisoners in South Africa, not just Mandela. Mandela had himself told the ANC that he did not wish to be singled out from other prisoners in the organisation's campaigning. Second, the event must campaign against apartheid as a whole and this was to be in its title. Third, it must call for sanctions against South Africa.

Hollingsworth argued that the concert could not be effective under those terms. They would not work for an event that was intended for the mass media across the world, including in countries where there might be little knowledge of Mandela, let alone support for him. The event should not be "angry", but a "positive" birthday tribute, calling only for Mandela to be freed.

Many broadcasters, Hollingsworth argued, would not televise a Mandela concert if it followed the AAM and ANC campaign policies. They would regard it as a political event. Other broadcasters would provide only limited airtime. But a positive birthday tribute would conform to the broadcasters' entertainment mandate and there would be a good chance they would show the full day's event. Hollingsworth was not seeking ANC backing because that would have put off broadcasters. He wanted the AAM's backing but, for similar reasons, did not want the movement's name on the event.

Terry was the first to come round to Hollingsworth's view, but needed some time before persuading the rest of his team. On the other hand, he quickly won the approval of Archbishop Trevor Huddleston, the AAM president and a former priest in southern Africa.

=== Funding and organisation ===
The initial funding for Nelson Mandela 70th Birthday Tribute came from Hollingsworth and, specifically, from the money that he had put into the production company, Elephant House, set up with television producer Neville Bolt. But the money amounted only "to 75 per cent of what was needed as a minimum". Funding to help pay the deposit on Wembley Stadium came from a trade-union loan organised by the Anti-Apartheid Movement. Wembley agreed to the unusual procedure of handing over ticket revenue as soon as it came in, and some television companies agreed to pay rights fees earlier than usual (although the BBC did not pay cash but provided facilities).

Although the aim of the day was to raise consciousness about South Africa and Mandela, the event also made a profit of $5 million. One half went to the AAM to cover its costs, including a protest march the following day; and one half to seven charities named by Archbishop Huddleston on condition that none of the money went towards the purchase of armaments.

The seven charities were: Oxfam, Christian Aid, War on Want, Catholic Fund for Overseas Development, Save the Children, Bishop Ambrose Reeves Trust and the International Defence and Aid Fund. With the charities in mind, a company, Freedom Productions, was set up to which the artists rights were assigned. Rights in the event are held by Tribute Inspirations Limited.

== Signing up first artists ==
By the time that the Anti-Apartheid Movement had agreed to support the concert, Hollingsworth had booked Wembley Stadium for the following June and had approached several artists in addition to Simple Minds. Few were saying a definite no, but hardly anyone would commit.

Hollingsworth wanted Dire Straits, one of the largest acts in the world and the kind of act that was needed if broadcasters across the world were to sign up for the event, to head the bill. The group took the same line as Simple Minds. The band's manager Ed Bicknell said that Dire Straits would perform if other top acts also agreed, but Hollingsworth was not to mention Dire Straits in persuading the other acts.

Hollingsworth signed up other big names, albeit on a provisional basis, put them in touch with one another and finally they all, including Dire Straits, agreed to perform. With clearly enough talent on board, Hollingsworth announced the bill in March, three months before the 11 June event. As well as Dire Straits, the list included: George Michael, Whitney Houston, UB40, Aswad, Sly and Robbie, Bee Gees, Miriam Makeba and Hugh Masekela. The announcement of the list made it easier to bring in further artists, including Eurythmics who had earlier refused three times, but other big names also.

There were some difficulties. Bicknell, for instance, was shocked when Hollingsworth told him there was one condition to Dire Straits playing. The band must rehearse for the event because it had not been on tour for some time and had even disbanded, albeit temporarily. Hollingsworth, in fact, told most of the artists they must rehearse, offering to pay for all rehearsal costs. Dire Straits, like the others, complied. In the event, the band had to bring in a guest guitarist to replace Jack Sonni, who had just become the father of twin girls. The new man was Eric Clapton.

A week after the first bill was announced, Simple Minds threatened to quit, arguing that there was not enough grit in it: Whitney Houston, for instance, should not be there. Hollingsworth argued that there was plenty of grit but that Whitney Houston was needed to broaden the audience to include people who were not so likely to know about Mandela and apartheid. Simple Minds accepted the argument.

=== Harry Belafonte ===
Hollingsworth went to New York to ask Harry Belafonte to give the opening address of the concert. Belafonte made it clear he was upset that, with so many musicians appearing, he was being asked only to talk. Hollingsworth told him the audience was not the right culture for him. He feared that Belafonte's singing would turn the clock back 30 years and would lose much of the television audience across the world. He was already worried about losing the audience as a result of using African singers and dancers whom many people would not have heard of. On the other hand, Belafonte, as a highly respected, internationally known personality, would be an effective speaker. Belafonte told him he would think about it, but Hollingsworth should also think about him performing.

The two spoke a week later, with each taking much the same position, although Hollingsworth added that Belafonte could sing if he could get a category-A artist, such as Bruce Springsteen or Mick Jagger or Elton John, to sing with him. Belafonte did not get any of those, but came back with a list which Hollingsworth said was not good enough. Eventually, Belafonte agreed just to give the opening speech.

=== Sting ===
Hollingsworth went to great lengths to get Sting to perform at the concert. The singer was associated with human rights issues, partly as a result of his song They Dance Alone about the Chilean dictator Augusto Pinochet, and was at the height of his popularity. Sting's manager Miles Copeland, however, refused even to put the proposition to the singer because he would be on a world tour at the time and the Wembley concert would not fit in. The final tour schedule showed Sting due to perform in Berlin the night before Wembley and elsewhere in Europe on the evening of the Wembley concert.

Several weeks before Wembley, Hollingsworth went to Switzerland where Sting was playing and booked himself into the same hotel. He got reception to put him through to Sting (using the singer's actual name, Gordon Sumner), told Sting that his management had refused to let him talk to the singer, and asked to meet him. Sting told him to come round to his room.

Hollingsworth told Sting that he would fly the singer and his band to London on a private plane after his Friday evening Berlin concert, drive him to Wembley in the morning where an identical set of equipment would be set up on stage for him. Sting would then do a sound check and open the show a few minutes after mid-day, the first act of the concert (after an opening speech and a set of South African show dancers). As soon as he had done his half-hour slot, he would be driven to the airport and put on the private plane taking him back to the continent. Sting agreed.

Copeland was furious about the agreement and shocked that Sting would open the show rather than be one of the closing acts. But the event was being organised not as a live concert but as a television show and that, according to Hollingsworth, meant a top act at the beginning when "the largest audience tunes in to see how it's going to be". At least one big act was planned for each hour of the 11-hour day in a bid to keep the audience.

=== Stevie Wonder ===
One of the first artists that Hollingsworth tried to sign up was Stevie Wonder. He could never get through to the singer, though he phoned him every Friday at his studio. Senior members of the team told him each time that the matter was "under consideration".

On the Wednesday before the concert, Wonder phoned back, asking whether there was still space for him. Hollingsworth told him there was a 25-minute slot – time that had originally been kept open for Prince and Bono to sing a duet together but which the two singers turned down. Wonder agreed the booking. This was never announced but was to be a surprise for the audience. In the event, the singer caused a major backstage drama when the equipment used to play his pre-recorded music was lost. He refused to play and walked out of the stadium – though he returned later using Whitney Houston's instruments.

==== Walk out ====
Wonder landed in the United Kingdom on the Saturday morning of the concert and went straight to Wembley Stadium, where a room was prepared for him and his band to warm up. He was to appear in the evening after UB40. His appearance had not been announced.

UB40 were finishing their set on the main stage, and Wonder's equipment was set up, plugged in and ready to be rolled on after a 10-minute act on a side stage. He was about to walk up the ramp to the stage when it was discovered that the hard disc of his synclavier, carrying all 25 minutes of synthesised music for his act, was missing. He said he could not play without it, turned round, walked down the ramp crying, with his band and other members of his entourage following him, and out of the stadium.

There was an urgent need to fill the gap he had left and Tracy Chapman, who had already performed her act, agreed to appear again. The two appearances shot her to stardom, with two songs from her recently released first album: "Fast Car" and "Talkin' 'Bout a Revolution". Before the concert, she had sold about 250,000 albums. In the following two weeks, she was said to have sold two million.

Wonder returned to the stadium, but turned down the request to use the same equipment as the present act on the main stage, Whitney Houston. Other members of the band said they would use other people's equipment. Finally, with time running out, Wonder agreed.

Houston finished with three encores and the next act, Salt-N-Pepa, started on the side stage using three minutes and 30 seconds of pre-approved stage time. Following Salt-N-Pepa's performance, there was no announcement, no sound from the main stage until, out of the darkness, came the opening lines of "I Just Called to Say I Love You" and a huge roar from the audience. The lights came on and Wonder went into the rest of the set. With the loss of the programmed hard disc, he shouted the change of notes to the band.

== Event ==
=== Television broadcasts ===
Once the first set of artists had signed up, broadcasters were approached, starting with the BBC. Alan Yentob, recently appointed controller of BBC2, said that he would provide five hours of airtime – and more if the bill improved. After several more top artists were added, the BBC agreed to televise the whole show. Before the concert, 24 Conservative MPs put down a House of Commons motion, criticising the BBC for giving "publicity to a movement that encourages the African National Congress in its terrorist activities". However, no appeal was either planned or made. Further, the artists’ contracts – which in many cases were signed backstage at Wembley – laid down that no proceeds from the income of the event should go "towards the purchase of or in any other connection with armaments".

What problems there were came from the other side. Both the Anti-Apartheid Movement and Hollingsworth received bomb threats warning them not to go ahead with the event. Nearer the event, there was a threat to blow up the power station distributing electricity to Wembley. With the BBC on board, it was easier to persuade other broadcasters to buy the rights for the concert. The show was in most cases sold to the entertainment divisions of broadcasters as a birthday tribute that would not be political. As a result, they could agree to show the event without referring the question upwards or to the news or current-affairs divisions. According to Hollingsworth, once they had agreed to show the concert, the news divisions would have to stop referring to Mandela as a terrorist leader, thereby helping to ensure that Mandela was looked upon in a more favourable light. This was said to be a campaign objective which was beginning to be achieved by March.

Even so, given the subject matter, the event was bound to be political in a broad sense. Thus, a week before the event, the Chicago Sun-Times said that the concert would have "the most overtly political theme since the 1960s.... It's a confrontational political event aimed at the government of South Africa and its practice of apartheid".

Broadcasters were also told that the concert would use two stages, enabling acts to follow each other without a break, with top acts on the main stage and lesser-known groups on the second. There would therefore be no need for broadcasters to add material between events. The reasoning was that, first, the concert would look like a television show without awkward gaps encouraging audiences to switch off; and, second, broadcasters would be less likely to impose their own narrative on the event. The use of film stars to introduce major acts also helped achieve these objectives. Some broadcasters did send presenters to carry out backstage interviews for the presumed gaps but stopped doing so after a couple of hours. Most broadcasters showed the event live. Others, particularly in the Americas, showed it delayed because of the time difference. Most gave more or less full coverage.

In the US, the Fox Television network showed only six hours in what was referred to as a "significantly de-radicalised version". A number of artists had their songs or speeches cut. One US newspaper objected that Fox "cut out some of the most passionate – and especially most political – moments of the day". Steven Van Zandt was appalled when he saw a recording of the Fox broadcast on his return to the US. He complained to the press, describing it as "a totally Orwellian experience". His own contribution, including a strident rendering of the song, Sun City, was one of those that were cut. Fox was worried about its sponsors and advertisers, particularly Coca-Cola which had booked six advertising spots for each hour.

Whitney Houston, who was contracted to make advertisements for Coca-Cola, did her act in front of a black backdrop instead of the usual picture of Nelson Mandela. But, according to Hollingsworth, this was nothing to do with censorship but the result of an electricity generator failing.

Fox also refused to use the concert title, Nelson Mandela 70th Birthday Tribute. Instead, it billed the show as Freedomfest, objecting to the pleas of the organisers to at least add "for Nelson Mandela".

A further issue was highlighted by film actress Whoopi Goldberg when she came on stage to introduce one of the acts, saying that she had been told to say nothing political. The request did not come from the concert organisers but from the Fox TV producer at Wembley who, unbeknown to the organisers, told the Hollywood film stars to avoid saying anything political because an election was coming up in the States. After the event, the producer – in charge of his own editing team for the US broadcast – took out a full-page advertisement in a US trade magazine thanking American artists for participating in his show.

=== Speeches ===
There were supposed to be no political speeches at the event except for the message that Nelson Mandela should be freed – coming from Harry Belafonte in his opening speech, from the film stars and musicians introducing the acts or the next piece of music and from the slogans around the stage. The principle – aimed at ensuring that broadcasters would, first, buy the television rights and, second, continue to show the proceedings – was more or less followed.

Early on, the organisers stopped an insistent Reverend Jesse Jackson, the African-American Civil Rights leader, from going on stage to make a speech. To have agreed to the request would have made it very difficult to say no to others. Jackson was, instead, shepherded to the Royal Box, joining Labour Party leader Neil Kinnock and Liberal leader David Steel along with a number of actors and musicians.

Nonetheless, the posters, the political references from the actors and musicians, the music itself, the way the singers worked the audience and the audience response almost certainly got across a wider political message about apartheid. One or two artists took a harder line. Steven Van Zandt, for instance, in the run-up to singing Sun City with Simple Minds, declared that "we the people will no longer tolerate the terrorism of the government of South Africa" and that "we will no longer do business with those who do business with the terrorist government of South Africa".

=== Resonant music ===
With Mandela's imprisonment often being regarded as "a symbol of oppression", the concert included several well-known protest songs and others which received an added resonance from the occasion. The songs included:

- "Free Nelson Mandela" by Jerry Dammers
- "Biko" by Peter Gabriel
- "They Dance Alone" by Sting
- "Sun City" by Steven Van Zandt
- "Mandela Day" by Simple Minds
- "I Just Called to Say I Love You" by Stevie Wonder
- "Amazing Grace", sung by Jessye Norman
- "I've Gotta Get a Message to You" by the Bee Gees

== Reception ==
The estimated audience for the Mandela 70th Birthday Tribute of 600 million in 67 countries was arguably an underestimate in that several broadcasters in Africa were given a free licence. However, the apartheid government did not allow the event to be broadcast in South Africa. But news of the event and its popularity reached Mandela and other political prisoners. In time, the strong ripple effect is thought to have increased pressure on the government to release Mandela, and it became increasingly likely that he would be released, albeit 20 months after the concert and 27 years after he was put in prison.

Shortly before Mandela's release, Hollingsworth, Terry and Mandela's lawyer sat down in London to plan another broadcast event to celebrate Mandela's release and to call for the end of Apartheid.

== Performers and speakers ==
| Performer/speaker | Setlist |
|---|---|
| The Farafina Drummers | |
| Harry Belafonte | Speech |
| Sting (introduced by Harry Belafonte) | "If You Love Somebody Set Them Free" "They Dance Alone" "Every Breath You Take" "Message in a Bottle" |
| Lenny Henry | Introductory speech |
| George Michael (introduced by Lenny Henry) | "Village Ghetto Land" "If You Were My Woman" "Sexual Healing" |
| Sir Richard Attenborough | Speech |
| Amampondo | |
| Whoopi Goldberg and Richard Gere | Speech |
| Eurythmics (introduced by Richard Gere) | "I Need a Man" "There Must Be an Angel (Playing with My Heart)" "Here Comes the Rain Again" "You Have Placed a Chill in My Heart" "When Tomorrow Comes" "Sweet Dreams (Are Made of This)" "Brand New Day" |
| Graham Chapman | "30 Seconds of Abuse" (Note: As part of Chapman's regular stand-up routine, he requests jeers and shouts from the crowd to "save a lot of time later on".) |
| The Arnhemland Dancers | |
| Whoopi Goldberg | Speech |
| Amabutho Male Chorus | |
| Lenny Henry | Impression of Michael Jackson |
| Al Green | "Let's Stay Together" |
| Joe Cocker | "Unchain My Heart" |
| Jonathan Butler | "True Love Never Fails" |
| Freddie Jackson | "Jam Tonight" |
| Ashford & Simpson | "Ain't No Mountain High Enough" |
| Natalie Cole | "Pink Cadillac" |
| Al Green, Joe Cocker, Jonathan Butler, Freddie Jackson, Ashford & Simpson, and Natalie Cole | "He's Got the Whole World in His Hands" "Higher and Higher" |
| Fry and Laurie | Stand-up |
| Tracy Chapman (first appearance) | "Why?" "Behind the Wall" "Talkin' Bout a Revolution" |
| *Wet Wet Wet (introduced by Daryl Hannah and Lenny Henry) | "Wishing I Was Lucky" |
| Midge Ure | Band introductions |
| Tony Hadley | "Harvest for the World" |
| Joan Armatrading | "Love and Affection" |
| Midge Ure | "Dear God" (with Phil Collins & Mark Brzezicki) |
| Paul Carrack | "How Long" |
| Fish | "Kayleigh" |
| Paul Young | "Don't Dream It's Over" |
| Curt Smith | "Everybody Wants to Rule the World" |
| Bryan Adams | "Somebody" |
| Bee Gees | "You Win Again" "I've Gotta Get a Message to You" |
| Jonas Gwangwa (introduced by Ali MacGraw and Philip Michael Thomas) | |
| Salif Keita (introduced by Delbert Wilkins) | |
| Youssou N’Dour | "Pitche Mi" "When the Stone Begins to Turn" (with Jackson Browne) |
| *Sly & Robbie and Aswad | "Set Them Free" |
Mahlathini and the Mahotella Queens
| Lenny Henry | as Delbert Wilkins |
| UB40 (introduced by Gregory Hines) | "Rat in Mi Kitchen" "Red Red Wine" |
| UB40 and Chrissie Hynde | "I Got You Babe" "Breakfast in Bed" "Sing Our Own Song" |
| Richard Gere | Speech |
| Whoopi Goldberg | Stand-up |
| Tracy Chapman (2nd appearance) (Note: In replacement of Stevie Wonder, due to him walking out last minute.) | "Fast Car" "Across the Lines" |
| Billy Connolly | Stand-up |
| Hugh Masekela and Miriam Makeba (introduced by Lenny Henry) | "Soweto Blues" |
| Miriam Makeba | "Pata Pata" |
| Michael Palin | Stand-up |
| Courtney Pine & IDJ Dancers | |
| Simple Minds (introduced by Emily Lloyd & Denzel Washington) | "Waterfront" "Summertime Blues" (with Johnny Marr) "Mandela Day" "Sanctify Yourself" "East at Easter" "Alive and Kicking" |
| Peter Gabriel, Simple Minds & Youssou N'Dour | "Biko" |
| Steven van Zandt, Simple Minds, Peter Gabriel, Meat Loaf, Jackson Browne, Youssou N'Dour & Daryl Hannah | "Sun City" |
| Jerry Dammers and Friends (introduced by Lenny Henry) | "Free Nelson Mandela" |
| Harry Enfield | Stand-up |
| Angolan Dance Troupe | |
| Whitney Houston (introduced by Corbin Bernsen and Jennifer Beals) | "Didn't We Almost Have It All" "Love Will Save the Day" "So Emotional" "Where Do Broken Hearts Go" "How Will I Know" "He/I Believe" (with Cissy Houston) "I Wanna Dance with Somebody" "Greatest Love of All" |
| Salt-N-Pepa (introduced by Meat Loaf) | "Push It" |
| Derek B (introduced by Meat Loaf) | "Free Mandela" |
| Stevie Wonder | "I Just Called to Say I Love You"; Speech "Dark 'n Lovely" |
| Fat Boys (introduced by Meat Loaf) | "Wipeout" "The Twist" "Free Mandela" (with Chubby Checker) |
| Harry Enfield | Stand-up |
| Lenny Henry | Impression of Tina Turner |
| Billy Connolly | Stand-up |
| Dire Straits and Eric Clapton (introduced by Billy Connolly) | "Walk of Life" "Sultans of Swing" "Romeo and Juliet" "Money for Nothing" "Brothers in Arms" "Wonderful Tonight" "Solid Rock" |
| Jessye Norman | "Amazing Grace" |

Australian comedy act The Doug Anthony Allstars were meant to perform, but a part of the set collapsed and they were unable to.

== See also ==
- 46664 (concerts)
- List of highest-grossing benefit concerts
- Nelson Mandela 90th Birthday Tribute
