= Sparkle in the Rain =

Studio album by Simple Minds
- Released: 6 February 1984
- Recorded: September–October 1983
- Studios: Monnow Valley (Rockfield, Wales); Townhouse (London)
- Genres: New wave; arena rock; pop rock; art pop
- Length: 44:41
- Labels: Virgin (UK); A&M (US)
- Producer: Steve Lillywhite

Simple Minds chronology
| New Gold Dream (81/82/83/84) (1982) | Sparkle in the Rain (1984) | Once Upon a Time (1985) |

Simple Minds studio albums chronology
| New Gold Dream (81/82/83/84) (1982) | Sparkle in the Rain (1984) | Once Upon a Time (1985) |

Singles from Sparkle in the Rain
- 1. "Waterfront" Released: 14 November 1983; 2. "Speed Your Love to Me" Released: 9 January 1984; 3. "Up on the Catwalk" Released: 12 March 1984

Sparkle in the Rain is the sixth studio album by Scottish rock band Simple Minds, released on 6 February 1984 by record label Virgin in the UK and A&M in the US. The album continued the commercial success the band experienced with their previous studio album, peaking at number 1 on the UK Albums Chart on 18 February 1984, and reached the top 20 in countries including New Zealand, Netherlands, Sweden, and Canada. Receiving mostly positive reviews in the United Kingdom and the United States, Sparkle in the Rain was ultimately certified platinum in the UK by the British Phonographic Industry, and significantly increased media interest in the band.

The lead single from the album, "Waterfront", was released in November 1983 to commercial success, followed by "Speed Your Love to Me" which was released in January 1984 ahead of the albums release. A third and final single, "Up on the Catwalk", was released in March 1984 and continued the commercial success for the band, with all three singles from the album reaching the top thirty in the United Kingdom.

== Background ==
Signs of a possible change in musical direction into a more stadium-oriented sound first became apparent during a series of live performances in the summer months of 1983 by Simple Minds to large European crowds. Lead singer Jim Kerr returned to a natural, unadorned facial and hair style, as "whatever they would have to say would be in the music." "Those gigs brought us back to the rawest kind of state, I think," Kerr said. "In places like that, 50,000 people, there's just no room for subtlety, and there's no need for it, there's no want for it." This foresaw the band coming into direct contact with U2 for the first time at the Belgian rock festival Torhout-Werchter; upon meeting the two bands immediately developed a strong liking for each other. Kerr remarked, "we saw a lot of ourselves in them and vice versa," and refuted the accusation that Simple Minds were merely joining the "new rock" led by U2. "We get this thing levelled at us of being influenced by them, but they're equally influenced by us. It might be in a much subtler sense, in dynamics or some of the sounds."

A new song, "Waterfront", was performed by the band when selected as "special guests" of headline acts U2 at Dublin's Phoenix Park in August 1983. "The song's throbbing pulse and enormous sense of space suggested the way the band were thinking," Adam Sweeting commented, "the elaborate, almost ornate arrangements of New Gold Dream (81/82/83/84) were receding into the distance. Simple Minds were making bigger music for bigger occasions." Shortly afterwards, the band were looking for a producer for their forthcoming sixth album; initially Alex Sadkin, of the Compass Point All Stars, was sought after due to his work with Grace Jones, but his schedule was incompatible with that of Simple Minds. Steve Lillywhite however, had wanted to produce for the band for a long time, and ultimately Simple Minds completed a three-way Celtic grouping along with U2's War and Big Country's The Crossing under Lillywhite.

== Recording ==
In September 1983, Simple Minds travelled to Monnow Valley Studio in Rockfield, near Monmouth in Wales, for three weeks to work on some new material; Lillywhite accompanied them for the last two weeks to meet the musicians and suggest some modifications to their music. This material consisted of around six tracks developed during a session the band had spent at a recording studio called The Chapel in Lincolnshire in January, and other initial samples recorded in London's Nomis Studios before their performance at Phoenix Park. At Rockfield, most of the tracks were dramatically changed, as they had begun as demos consisting only of work by Mick MacNeil and Charlie Burchill, with some drum and bass machine sounds overlapping. With drummer Mel Gaynor now having fully integrated himself into the band, the songwriting was beginning to be influenced consistently from all group members.

The group relocated to Townhouse Studios in London by October, by which time their updated material retained "only a bassline or keyboard melody from the original four-track demo". As a producer, Lillywhite differed from Peter Walsh on the previous album by going with "the feel of the moment" rather than following "any preconceptions about how he wanted the album to turn out". He tried to emphasize musical unity between the band members; for instance, he pressed Jim Kerr to write lyrics for songs as soon as he could, such that his vocal melodies were influenced by the instrumentation. "On their earlier records, everyone's parts didn't really bear much resemblance to everyone else's," said Lillywhite. "Mick would be fiddling away like this, Charlie would be going like this, then Jim would come in and sing something completely different to what the other two were doing. Whereas I now think Jim is taking some of the melodies from the guitar and the keyboards, which he didn't use to, which makes it more like a song."

Burchill likened Lillywhite's producing style and manner to that of the film director Werner Herzog. Generally starting studio work at 11am, the band found the recording process repetitive, as each track was meticulously refined and sharpened through multiple iterations. With this leading to the group becoming tense and distracted, Lillywhite occasionally asked the band members to vacate the studio while he worked on mixing. The album's working title was Quiet Night of the White Hot Day, which eventually survived as a lyric in the complete album's seventh track "White Hot Day". The recording process drew to a completion with Lillywhite and the band adding some finishing touches to "Up on the Catwalk"; Jim Kerr sang some additional lines that had been stored in his notebook instead of name-dropping some extra famous people towards the song's end. Minor imperfections in phasing and pitch were then corrected to complete the album.

== Composition and lyrics ==
Kerr, before its release, described the forthcoming Sparkle in the Rain as an "art record—art without tears with masses of muscle". The band's new drummer Mel Gaynor, who had contributed for some tracks on the previous record, agreed on the album's aggressiveness: "On this album I'm getting a few of my ideas across, not only in the drumming field but in other fields as well. It's a lot different from New Gold Dream, both sound-wise and material-wise. The last one was very smooth, very polished. This album's got a bit more dirt in it." Regarding the role of producer Steve Lillywhite, Brian Hogg wrote that Sparkle in the Rain "captured the bravura of their in-concert sound" and Lillywhite "introduced a dynamic, often contrasting, perspective quite unlike the panoramic standpoint of its predecessor, but there was no denying the resultant brash excitement." Adam Sweeting described how, during the recording process of "Up on the Catwalk", "Forbes and Gaynor had combined to create a steamrolling rhythm track which came hammering out of the opening chorus like a runaway train."

Sparkle in the Rain has been described as a new wave, arena rock, pop rock and art pop album, featuring a more rock-oriented sound than its predesccors. MacKenzie Wilson of AllMusic retrospectively described the album's musical style thus: "Synth-beats throb over Charlie Burchill's new wave third-chord guitars and swooning basslines...Piano vibes are pinch-hitting and Kerr's songwriting thrives on celebrity and the falling grace that coincides that." The overall effect of the instrumentation is a "densely packed juggernaut of an LP", with Adam Sweeting describing the "big, spacey feel" of "Waterfront" as atypical. Other slower tracks include the instrumental "Shake Off the Ghosts" and the "pensive" "'C' Moon Cry Like a Baby", while the punk-revivalist "The Kick Inside of Me", "straining vocal and stinging guitar" of "Speed Your Love to Me", and "pounding percussion and keyboards" of "Up on the Catwalk" and "Book of Brilliant Things" emphasize the album's more intense sound. Matt White of PopMatters described the band's transformation into "soaring, grandiose rock": "The electronic elements are pared down in favor of more standard piano flourishes, the guitar now having won the battle of dominant instrument."

A review of the album for Rolling Stone discussed how many of Jim Kerr's lyrics can be interpreted as religious references, such as The Bible in "Book of Brilliant Things", or redemption at the Christian cross in "East at Easter". "Simple Minds find religious illumination in the vertigo of their fertile imaginations," wrote Parke Puterbaugh, "and it comes out as psychedelic testifying – all fast movement and kaleidoscopic repetition – that builds to a crescendo of ecstasy and release." Hence, the subject matter on Sparkle in the Rain can be seen as more outward-looking and aspirational than on more introspective tracks such as "Someone Somewhere in Summertime" on the preceding album. For example, "Waterfront" was written as both a eulogy to their place of origin Glasgow and as a celebration of much wider aspirations to recover its once-thriving industry. Jim Kerr, stating that the song's lyrics were inspired by the ruined shipbuilding sector on the River Clyde, said "you always see your home town differently when you come back...I became aware of a grander scheme of things," although Puterbaugh speculated that lyrics such as "Get in, get out of the rain" and "...move on up to the waterfront" may relate to "baptismal immersion or death".

Jim Kerr's vocal performance on "The Kick Inside of Me" was described by Dave Thompson of AllMusic as "a Saint Vitus frenzy", where he "attempts to shake the ghosts right out of his body. Are they the specters of punk's past, the spirits of inspiration now gone? Or the shades that dwell in our deepest recesses, set free by the power of music?" "Speed Your Love to Me", meanwhile, concerns "people running to meet each other, unable to focus on anything other than a reunion that keeps receding." Noel Murray, writing for The A.V. Club, speculated, "While the guitars twinkle and Kerr yells, "You go to my head," it's hard to know whether the moment is ecstatic or desperately manic." PopMatters' Matt White described the song's lyrics as managing "to make a line like 'She would like to make a wish / Twenty-four cannot be this' sound both sad and triumphant." The album also contains an abbreviated cover version of Lou Reed's song "Street Hassle", a song the band had previously played live a number of times during the 1982–1983 New Gold Tour.

== Release ==
Due to a desire to release the album worldwide simultaneously, Simple Minds decided not to put the record out for sale before Christmas 1983, instead releasing Sparkle in the Rain on 6 February 1984. The first UK pressing was issued on white vinyl and the first Canadian pressing was issued on transparent vinyl; all other foreign editions were initially issued on black vinyl; the album immediately entered the UK Albums Chart at No. 1 to become the band's first chart-topper, and it remained in the charts for 57 weeks; among the band's records, only Once Upon a Time has bettered this chart run. The first Canadian pressing was issued on transparent vinyl (but using the standard green/red Virgin label instead of the custom design); the album peaked at No. 14 in the Canadian RPM national album chart. Sparkle in the Rain was certified gold in Canada for selling over 50,000 units in that country, and topped the New Zealand Albums Chart for two weeks, further remaining in their charts for eighteen weeks. Sparkle in the Rain also peaked at No. 2 in both Sweden, charting for six weeks, and the Netherlands, charting for thirty weeks. By 1988, Sparkle in the Rain had sold approximately one million-and-a-half copies worldwide.

Sparkle in the Rain produced three UK Top 40 singles. The first was "Waterfront", peaking at No. 1 in the New Zealand Singles Chart and charting for thirteen weeks. It also reached No. 13 in the UK Singles Chart, and remained in the charts for ten weeks. It remains one of the band's signature songs to this day. The album was also preceded by the release of "Speed Your Love to Me" which reached No. 20 in the UK, although "Up on the Catwalk" fared less well; released in March 1984, the single peaked at 27.

Virgin Records reissued Sparkle in the Rain as a remastered edition on 21 October 2002; this edition features improved sound quality and faithfully reproduced artwork and packaging from the original record. Around 2006, a set of eight demos for the album from 1983 were leaked to the internet. The drumming for "Speed Your Love To Me" is less dramatic, while "Book of Brilliant Things" is driven by a much stronger bass line than the album version. "White Hot Day" is at a slower tempo, and "Shake Off the Ghosts" sounds more related to the instrumental B-side "Brass Band in Africa" at this stage.

On 16 March 2015, a new 4CD/DVD deluxe remastered boxset of Sparkle in the Rain was released, containing B-sides and remixes on Disc 2 and live performances and radio sessions on Discs 3 and 4. The DVD features both a regular DVD-Video layer and a DVD-Audio layer. The DVD-Video layer contains a surround sound mix of the album in both 5.1 DTS and 5.1 Dolby Digital, along with a new, high resolution stereo mix. The DVD-Audio layer contains a new, high resolution, MLP stereo mix and a high resolution, MLP 5.1 mix, as well as the three promotional videos for the singles and three TV performances. These new stereo and 5.1 mixes were created by Steven Wilson in 2014 and mastered at Abbey Road Studios by Andrew Walter. A manufacturing error resulted in faulty DVDs and a missing paragraph in the liner notes in the early copies of the deluxe boxset release. Universal sent out replacement discs and booklets and subsequent copies of the box set featured the corrected DVD disc and booklet.

Released at the same time as the box set was a Blu-Ray Audio package that contained the original 1984 stereo mix along with Steven Wilson's 2014 stereo and 5.1 surround sound mixes. Initial copies of this Blu-Ray had a mono mix instead of Steven Wilson's 2014 stereo mix, and there were also problems with the 5.1 mix. Universal supplied a corrected disc to owners and subsequent copies of the Blu-Ray featured the corrected disc in the box.

== Critical reception ==
Professional ratings
Review scores
| Source | Rating |
|---|---|
| AllMusic | 3/5 stars |
| Classic Pop | 4/5 stars |
| Classic Rock | 7/10 |
| Mojo | 3/5 stars |
| Q | 4/5 stars |
| Record Collector | 4/5 stars |
| Record Mirror | 4/5 stars |
| Rolling Stone | 4/5 stars |
| Smash Hits | 8/10 |
| Uncut | 7/10 |

Upon release, Sparkle in the Rain received mostly favourable reviews. In the U.S., Parke Puterbaugh writing for Rolling Stone awarded the album four stars out of five, describing the record as the band's finest, and their playing as weaving "a complex web of sound from the unlikeliest parts: churchy, staccato keyboards; lacelike, arpeggiated guitar lines and soaring wisps of feedback; and metallic-sounding drums." Puterbaugh summarized Sparkle in the Rain as "Roxy Music-gone-2001". A review in the College Music Journal complimented how Lillywhite's production gave the band "a grand sound to match their lyrical ambitions", drawing comparisons with the sounds of bands such as U2 and Big Country and how "it helps Simple Minds sound more cohesive...the words and music forming a complete whole rather than two antagonistic elements as in the past." Sparkle in the Rain was listed by CMJ at No. 20 in their "Top 20 Most-Played Albums of 1984".

In the UK, meanwhile, where the album met with much greater commercial success at No. 1 in the charts, Don Watson of the NME felt such a grand, rock-oriented sound compared unfavourably with those aforementioned bands, dubbing Simple Minds "U3" in his review. This moniker went down badly amongst members of the band. Nonetheless, listeners of the Toronto-based radio alternative radio station CFNY-FM voted Sparkle in the Rain the third best album of 1984, behind Mirror Moves by The Psychedelic Furs and U2's The Unforgettable Fire but ahead of Echo & the Bunnymen's Ocean Rain and Frankie Goes to Hollywood's Welcome to the Pleasuredome.

In a retrospective review for AllMusic, MacKenzie Wilson said that the record marked "the band's best effort thus far, capturing thick seascapes of illustrious lyrical visions". The review continued: "Sparkle in the Rain is a glimpse of what's to come from Simple Minds. Kerr's heart-wrenching vocals soar and such emotion only leads to earning a global following." Noel Murray of The A.V. Club called it "an album that surrounds listeners with pounding percussion and resonant chime" with songs that explore "the intersection of surface glitz and raw human need."

== Legacy ==
"Sparkle in the Rain is supposed to be when the rot set in: a regressive step back from pop to stadium rock. But the ambient bombast of "Waterfront" is actually pretty magnificent in a Jim Morrison sort of way. And "Up on the Catwalk" is probably Simple Minds' most underrated single, their last bout of topsy-turviness and abstract euphoria, before the descent into facile transcendentalism and blunt, unwarranted affirmation ("Alive and Kicking", etc)."

— Simon Reynolds

In his biography of the band, Adam Sweeting looked back on Sparkle in the Rain as a "transitional album, a step away from the mesmerizing, instrumentally based travelling music they'd become identified with towards an outsize form of rock. Their new music was harder, heavier, and less subtle. They knew they were moving on towards a new phase, but they hadn't got it quite right yet, which was why Sparkle seemed rooted in the past while straining to see into a future which still wasn't entirely clear."

Simon Price of The Independent, agreeing that the album was a departure, asserted that although "something horrible happened" later in Simple Minds' career, Sparkle in the Rain was not the cause: "Their post-New Gold Dream decline didn't immediately make itself obvious. Sparkle in the Rain pioneered a new "Big Music" whose full stadium-sized horror had yet to become apparent, and there was something attractive about the clattering majesty of "Waterfront". Peter Walker, writing for The Guardian, went against this view, describing "the thudding, plodding backdrop to "Waterfront", lead single for the follow-up album, 1984's Sparkle in the Rain. The song was their first major hit but heralded a new, lumpen Simple Minds, who in pursuit of U2 and world domination shed all that was good about their sound."

Sparkle in the Rain was listed as the 100th greatest Scottish album of all time by a 2003 issue of The Scotsman newspaper, who praised the album thus: "Released in 1984, Sparkle in the Rain was the album by which Simple Minds became a 'stadium' band. Lillywhite conjured a more direct sound in which former subtleties were shrouded in power and dynamism. New drummer Mel Gaynor thrived in this environment, best exemplified in "Waterfront", a homage to Glasgow as seen through the changing face of the River Clyde."

== Track listing ==
All tracks are written by Simple Minds (Charlie Burchill, Derek Forbes, Jim Kerr, Mel Gaynor, Michael MacNeil); except where noted.

Side A
| No. | Title | Length |
|---|---|---|
| 1. | "Up on the Catwalk" | 4:45 |
| 2. | "Book of Brilliant Things" | 4:21 |
| 3. | "Speed Your Love to Me" | 4:24 |
| 4. | "Waterfront" | 4:49 |
| 5. | "East at Easter" | 3:32 |

Side B
| No. | Title | Writer(s) | Length |
|---|---|---|---|
| 6. | "Street Hassle" | Lou Reed | 5:14 |
| 7. | "White Hot Day" | | 4:32 |
| 8. | "'C' Moon Cry Like a Baby" | | 4:19 |
| 9. | "The Kick Inside of Me" | | 4:48 |
| 10. | "Shake Off the Ghosts (Instrumental)" | | 3:57 |

Deluxe Edition Disc 1: The Original Album
| No. | Title | Writer(s) | Length |
|---|---|---|---|
| 1. | "Up on the Catwalk" | | 4:45 |
| 2. | "Book of Brilliant Things" | | 4:21 |
| 3. | "Speed Your Love to Me" | | 4:24 |
| 4. | "Waterfront" | | 4:49 |
| 5. | "East at Easter" | | 3:32 |
| 6. | "Street Hassle" | Lou Reed | 5:14 |
| 7. | "White Hot Day" | | 4:32 |
| 8. | "'C' Moon Cry Like a Baby" | | 4:19 |
| 9. | "The Kick Inside of Me" | | 4:48 |
| 10. | "Shake Off the Ghosts" | | 3:57 |

Deluxe Edition Disc 2: B-Sides & Rarities
| No. | Title | Writer(s) | Length |
|---|---|---|---|
| 1. | "Waterfront" (Edit) | | 4:47 |
| 2. | "Hunter and the Hunted" (Live) | Charlie Burchill, Derek Forbes, Jim Kerr, Michael MacNeil | 5:57 |
| 3. | "Waterfront" (Extended) | | 5:52 |
| 4. | "Speed Your Love to Me" (Edit) | | 4:05 |
| 5. | "Bass Line" | | 4:42 |
| 6. | "Speed Your Love to Me" (Extended) | | 7:18 |
| 7. | "Up on the Catwalk" (Edit) | | 4:05 |
| 8. | "A Brass Band in Africa" | | 5:08 |
| 9. | "Up on the Catwalk" (Extended) | | 7:30 |
| 10. | "A Brass Band in African Chimes" | | 9:24 |
| 11. | "Waterfront" (Single Version) | | 4:03 |

Deluxe Edition Disc 3: Live - Barrowland Glasgow 28/02/84 and Radio One Session
| No. | Title | Writer(s) | Length |
|---|---|---|---|
| 1. | "Shake Off the Ghosts (Intro)" (Live - Barrowland Glasgow 28/02/84) | | 1:21 |
| 2. | "Waterfront" (Live - Barrowland Glasgow 28/02/84) | | 8:09 |
| 3. | "Up on the Catwalk" (Live - Barrowland Glasgow 28/02/84) | | 5:47 |
| 4. | "Book of Brilliant Things" (Live - Barrowland Glasgow 28/02/84) | | 8:07 |
| 5. | "Glittering Prize" (Live - Barrowland Glasgow 28/02/84) | Charlie Burchill, Derek Forbes, Jim Kerr, Michael MacNeil | 6:06 |
| 6. | "The American" (Live - Barrowland Glasgow 28/02/84) | Brian McGee, Charlie Burchill, Derek Forbes, Jim Kerr, Michael MacNeil | 7:14 |
| 7. | "King is White and in the Crowd" (Live - Barrowland Glasgow 28/02/84) | Charlie Burchill, Derek Forbes, Jim Kerr, Michael MacNeil | 7:19 |
| 8. | "Speed Your Love to Me" (Live - Barrowland Glasgow 28/02/84) | | 5:36 |
| 9. | "Someone Somewhere in Summertime" (Live - Barrowland Glasgow 28/02/84) | Charlie Burchill, Derek Forbes, Jim Kerr, Michael MacNeil | 6:05 |
| 10. | "Promised You a Miracle" (Live - Barrowland Glasgow 28/02/84) | Charlie Burchill, Derek Forbes, Jim Kerr, Michael MacNeil | 7:10 |
| 11. | "Big Sleep" (Live - Barrowland Glasgow 28/02/84) | Charlie Burchill, Derek Forbes, Jim Kerr, Michael MacNeil | 7:38 |
| 12. | "New Gold Dream (81–82–83–84) / Take Me to the River / Light My Fire" (Live - Barrowland Glasgow 28/02/84) | Charlie Burchill, Derek Forbes, Jim Kerr, Michael MacNeil, Al Green, Mabon "Teenie" Hodges, Jim Morrison, Robbie Krieger, John Densmore, Ray Manzarek | 12:41 |
| 13. | "Love Song / Glory" (Live - Barrowland Glasgow 28/02/84) | Brian McGee, Charlie Burchill, Derek Forbes, Jim Kerr, Michael MacNeil, Tom Verlaine | 9:12 |
| 14. | "Waterfront" (Radio One Session, London 1983) | | 4:40 |
| 15. | "The Kick Inside of Me" (Radio One Session, London 1983) | | 5:39 |
| 16. | "New Gold Dream (81–82–83–84)" (Radio One Session, London 1983) | Charlie Burchill, Derek Forbes, Jim Kerr, Michael MacNeil | 5:06 |

Deluxe Edition Disc 4 (DVD): 5.1. Mix, Promo Videos and Television
| No. | Title | Writer(s) | Length |
|---|---|---|---|
| 1. | "Up on the Catwalk" (5.1. Surround Mix/Hi-Res Stereo Mix/Dolby Digital 5.1 Surround Mix) | | 4:46 |
| 2. | "Book of Brilliant Things" (5.1. Surround Mix/Hi-Res Stereo Mix/Dolby Digital 5.1 Surround Mix) | | 4:22 |
| 3. | "Speed Your Love to Me" (5.1. Surround Mix/Hi-Res Stereo Mix/Dolby Digital 5.1 Surround Mix) | | 4:25 |
| 4. | "Waterfront" (5.1. Surround Mix/Hi-Res Stereo Mix/Dolby Digital 5.1 Surround Mix) | | 4:49 |
| 5. | "East at Easter" (5.1. Surround Mix/Hi-Res Stereo Mix/Dolby Digital 5.1 Surround Mix) | | 3:33 |
| 6. | "Street Hassle" (5.1. Surround Mix/Hi-Res Stereo Mix/Dolby Digital 5.1 Surround Mix) | Lou Reed | 5:15 |
| 7. | "White Hot Day" (5.1. Surround Mix/Hi-Res Stereo Mix/Dolby Digital 5.1 Surround Mix) | | 4:34 |
| 8. | ""C" Moon Cry Like a Baby" (5.1. Surround Mix/Hi-Res Stereo Mix/Dolby Digital 5.1 Surround Mix) | | 4:21 |
| 9. | "The Kick Inside of Me" (5.1. Surround Mix/Hi-Res Stereo Mix/Dolby Digital 5.1 Surround Mix) | | 4:49 |
| 10. | "Shake Off the Ghosts" (5.1. Surround Mix/Hi-Res Stereo Mix/Dolby Digital 5.1 Surround Mix) | | 3:59 |
| 11. | "Waterfront" (Promo Video) | | 4:49 |
| 12. | "Speed Your Love To Me" (Promo Video) | | 4:24 |
| 13. | "Up on the Catwalk" (Promo Video) | | 4:47 |
| 14. | "Waterfront" (Top Of The Pops 24/11/83) | | 4:04 |
| 15. | "Speed Your Love to Me" (Live, Oxford Road Show 30/01/84) | | 5:02 |
| 16. | "Up on the Catwalk" (Live, Oxford Road Show 30/04/84) | | 3:32 |

Note

- The 'deluxe edition' of Sparkle in the Rain comprises disc 1 (The Original Album) and disc 2 (B-Sides & Rarities).
- The 'super deluxe edition' of Sparkle in the Rain comprises all 4 discs.

== Personnel ==
Adapted from the album's liner notes.

Simple Minds

- Jim Kerr – vocals
- Charlie Burchill – acoustic and electric guitars
- Derek Forbes – bass, vocals
- Mel Gaynor – drums, vocals
- Mick MacNeil – keyboards, vocals

Additional personnel

- Kirsty MacColl – voice on "Speed Your Love to Me" and "Street Hassle"

== Production ==
Adapted from the album's liner notes.

- Producer – Steve Lillywhite
- Engineer – Howard Gray
- Assistant engineers – Paul Cook and Gavin McKillop
- Studio equipment – Matt Dunn and Paul Kerr
- Sleeve production – Assorted Images
- Coordination – Gemma Corfield

== Chart positions ==
=== Weekly charts ===
| Chart (1984–2015) | Peak position |
|---|---|
| Australia Albums (Kent Music Report) | 15 |
| Belgian Albums (Ultratop Flanders) | 89 |
| Belgian Albums (Ultratop Wallonia) | 105 |
| Canada Albums (RPM) | 14 |
| Dutch Albums (Album Top 100) | 2 |
| Finnish Albums (The Official Finnish Charts) | 26 |
| German Albums (Offizielle Top 100) | 14 |
| New Zealand Albums (RMNZ) | 1 |
| Norwegian Albums (VG-lista) | 14 |
| Swedish Albums (Sverigetopplistan) | 2 |
| Swiss Albums (Schweizer Hitparade) | 19 |
| UK Albums (OCC) | 1 |
| US Billboard 200 | 64 |

=== Year-end charts ===
| Chart (1984) | Position |
|---|---|
| Canada Albums (RPM) | 39 |
| Dutch Albums (Album Top 100) | 18 |
| New Zealand Albums (RMNZ) | 36 |
| UK Albums (OCC) | 46 |

== Certifications ==
| Region | Certification | Certified units/sales |
|---|---|---|
| Belgium (BRMA) | Gold | 25,000^{*} |
| Canada (Music Canada) | Gold | 50,000^{^} |
| France (SNEP) | Gold | 100,000^{*} |
| New Zealand (RMNZ) | Gold | 7,500^{^} |
| United Kingdom (BPI) | Platinum | 300,000^{^} |
| Yugoslavia | — | 13,765 |
^{*} Sales figures based on certification alone.^{^} Shipments figures based on certification alone.
