= Waterfront (song) =

Song by Simple Minds

Single by Simple Minds

from the album Sparkle in the Rain
- B-side: "Hunter and the Hunted" (live)
- Released: 14 November 1983
- Recorded: September 1983
- Genre: Rock
- Length: 4:43
- Label: Virgin
- Songwriters: Jim Kerr; Charlie Burchill; Derek Forbes; Mel Gaynor; Mick MacNeil
- Producer: Steve Lillywhite

Simple Minds singles chronology
"I Travel (2nd reissue)" (1983)	"Waterfront" (1983)	"Speed Your Love to Me" (1984)

"Waterfront" is a song by Scottish rock band Simple Minds, released as the first single from their sixth studio album, Sparkle in the Rain (1984), in November 1983. "Waterfront" became a chart hit around the world, topping the New Zealand Singles Chart for two weeks during February 1984. It also reached number 13 on the UK Singles Chart, number 16 in Sweden, number 19 in Australia and number five in Ireland.

== Background and recording ==
Prior to the release of "Waterfront" as the first single from Simple Minds' forthcoming album Sparkle in the Rain in November 1983, the song had been premiered at a live gig a few months earlier and in a radio session for Kid Jensen.

== Composition ==
It features a bass line consisting of a single note (D) throughout. The version as released on 7-inch vinyl single differs from versions available on CD. The original single did not feature the repetitive bassline that leads into the main body of the song but had a "one, two....one, two, three, four.." drumstick count-in by drummer Mel Gaynor.

The song originated from the one-note bassline Derek Forbes came up with. The lyrics, which express a feeling of hope for rebirth, were written by Jim Kerr and inspired by his walking along the River Clyde in summer 1983 watching the decline of the shipyard industry in his native Glasgow.

== Music video ==
The music video features a shot of a live performance of the song to an invited audience at Barrowland's Ballroom in Glasgow on 20 November 1983, with additional black-and-white footage of the band on Renfrew Ferry and aerial shots of the River Clyde.

== Track listings ==
7-inch single

1. "Waterfront" – 4:43
2. "Hunter and the Hunted" (recorded live at the City Hall, Newcastle, 20 November 1982) – 6:00

12-inch single

1. "Waterfront" (extended version) – 5:48
2. "Hunter and the Hunted" (recorded live at the City Hall, Newcastle, 20 November 1982) – 6:00

== Personnel ==
- Produced by Steve Lillywhite
- Engineered by Howard Gray
- Words and music by Simple Minds
- Additional production and remix on "Waterfront" (extended version) by Steve Lillywhite

== Charts ==
Chart (1983–1984)	Peak position
Australia (Kent Music Report)	19
Ireland (IRMA)	5
New Zealand (Recorded Music NZ)	1
Sweden (Sverigetopplistan)	16
UK Singles (Official Charts)	13

== Sales ==
Region	Certification	Certified units/sales
United Kingdom	—	100,436
