= Jim Kerr =

Scottish singer (born 1959)

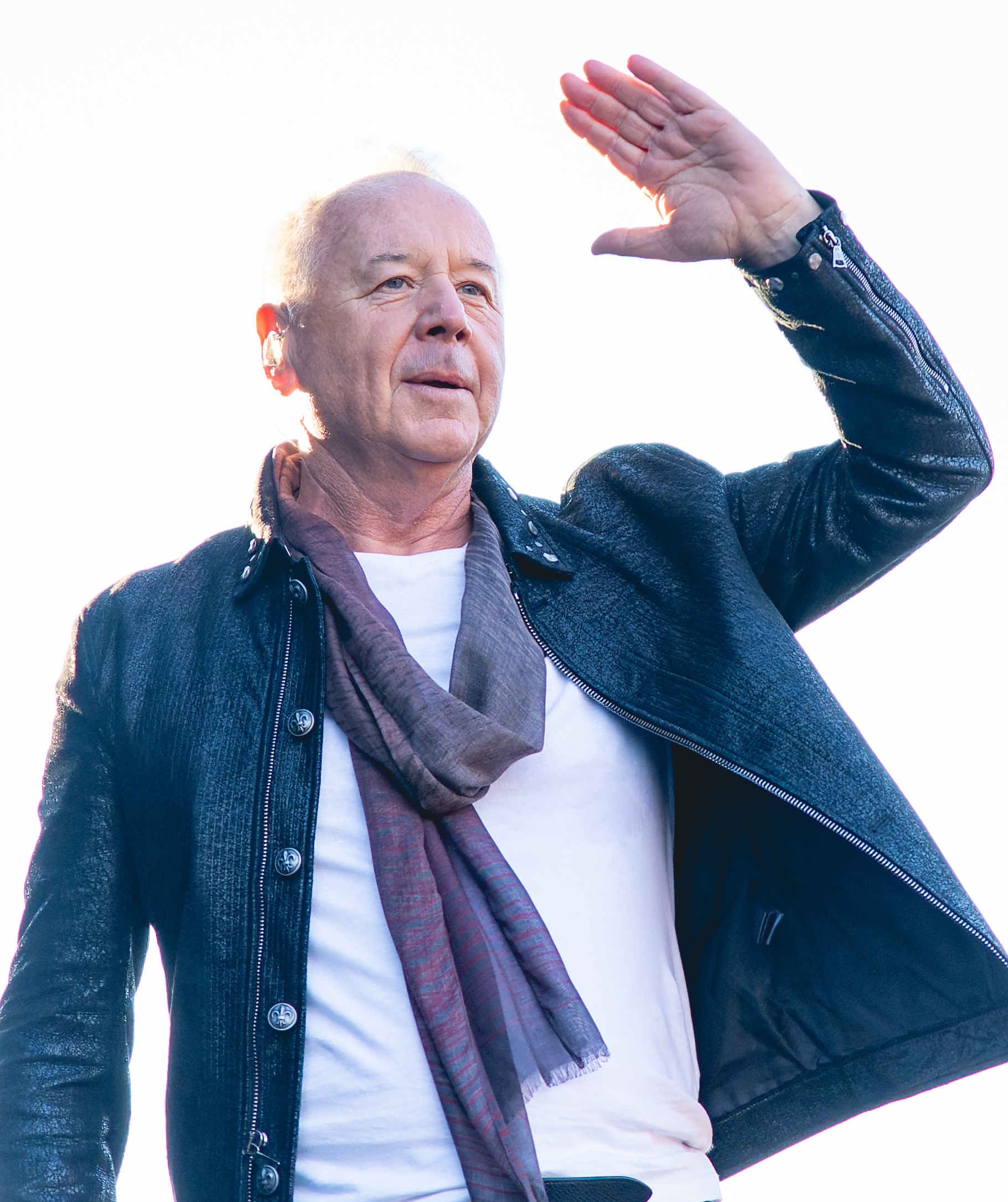
- Kerr performing at the Isle of Wight Festival with Simple Minds, 2024
- Born: James Kerr; 9 July 1959 (age 67); Toryglen, Glasgow, Scotland
- Citizenship: United Kingdom; Italy
- Occupations: Singer; songwriter
- Years active: 1977–present
- Spouses: Chrissie Hynde (m. 1984; div. 1990); Patsy Kensit (m. 1992; div. 1996)
- Children: 2
- Musical career
- Genres: Rock; new wave; pop rock; synth rock; synth pop
- Instruments: Vocals
- Member of: Simple Minds
- Website: simpleminds.com

James Kerr (/kɛər/) (born 9 July 1959) is a Scottish singer, best known for being the frontman of the rock band Simple Minds. Commercially successful singles released by Simple Minds include "Glittering Prize" (1982), "Someone Somewhere in Summertime" (1982), "Waterfront" (1983), "Don't You (Forget About Me)" (1985, #1 U.S. and #1 Canada), and "Alive and Kicking" (1985), as well as the UK number one single "Belfast Child" (1989).

With Kerr as their lead singer, Simple Minds have achieved five UK Albums chart number one albums, Sparkle in the Rain (1984), Once Upon a Time (1985), Live in the City of Light (1987), Street Fighting Years (1989) and Glittering Prize 81/92 (1992); they have sold more than 60 million albums. They were the most commercially successful Scottish band of the 1980s. Simple Minds have also achieved considerable chart success in the United States, Australia, Germany, Spain, Italy and New Zealand.

Kerr released his first solo album, Lostboy! AKA Jim Kerr, on 27 May 2010. His voice has been described as "David Bowie's rich baritone melded with Bryan Ferry's velvety croon".

== Early life ==
James Kerr was born in Toryglen, Glasgow, into a family of Irish Scots ancestry. He had a stammer during childhood and in his early teens.

== Career ==
=== Simple Minds (1977–present) ===
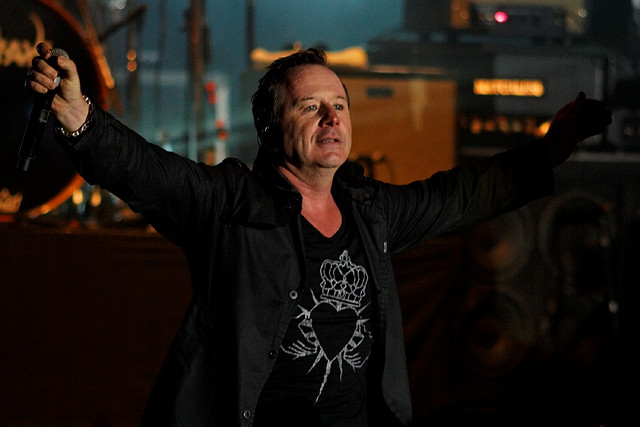
Kerr performing with Simple Minds, 2009

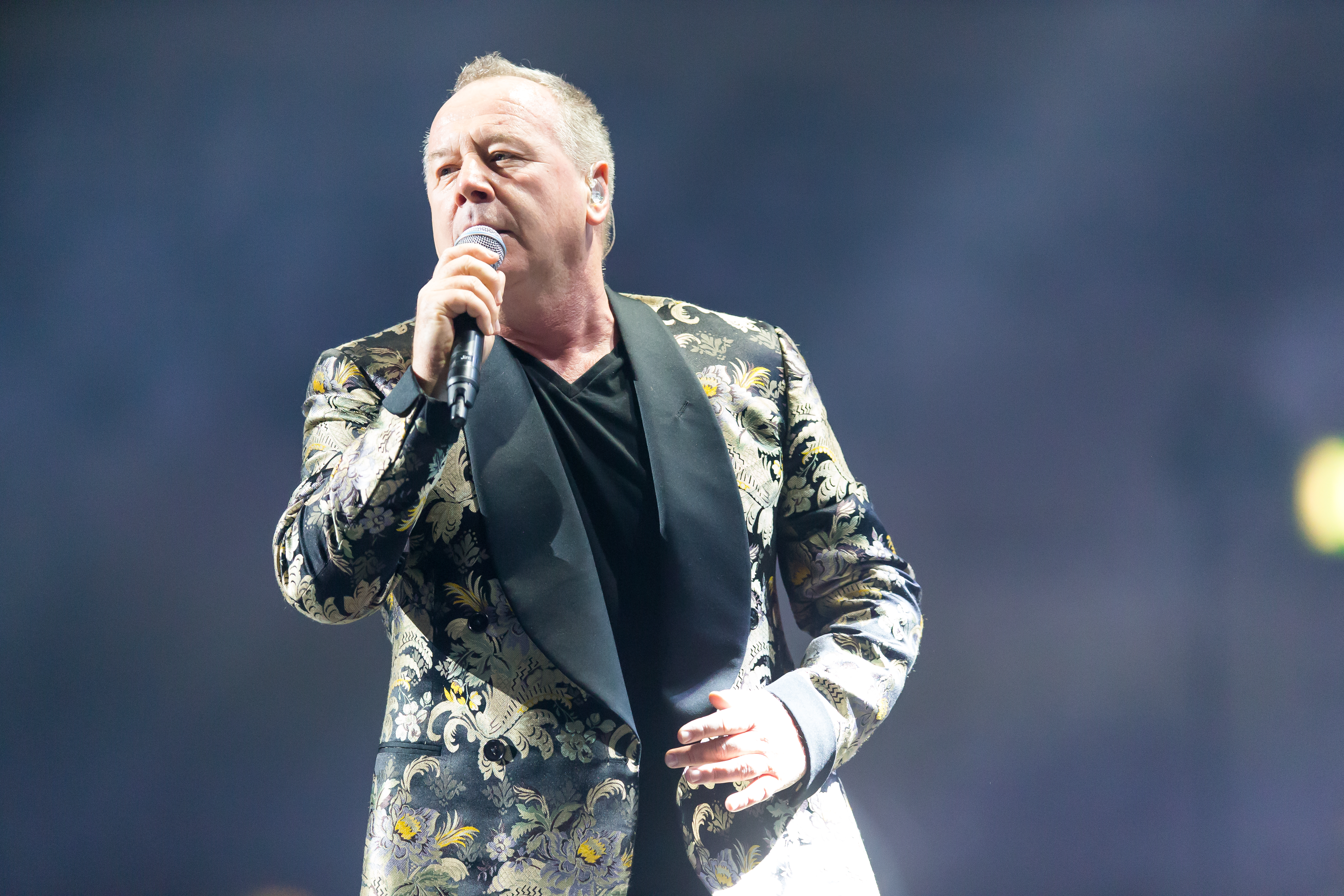
Kerr performing at Night of the Proms in 2016

==== Establishment ====
In 1977, he was one of the founding members of the 6-piece punk rock band Johnny and the Self Abusers. Calling himself Pripton Weird, he played keyboards and shared vocals with John Milarky. Allan McNeill was also involved with the band, and went on to be the manager of the pop band Hue and Cry. The band lasted 8 months, during which time Kerr emerged as one of the main songwriters. In November 1977, they changed their name to Simple Minds, quickly reduced to 4 members, then increased to 5, then 6, then back to 5 before a period of stability ensued.

==== Breakthrough ====
Simple Minds achieved major commercial success throughout the 1980s, releasing the UK number three album New Gold Dream (81–82–83–84) in 1982, and then scoring four consecutive UK number one albums with Sparkle in the Rain (1984), Once Upon a Time (1985), Live in the City of Light (1987) and Street Fighting Years (1989) and one UK number one single, "Belfast Child" (1989), followed by a fifth UK number one album with Glittering Prize 81/92 in 1992.

==== Recent activity ====
In 2026 Kerr recorded his twentieth studio album with Simple Minds, and there will be an Australian and New Zealand tour in 2027.

=== Solo work (2010–2012) ===
"Shadowland" was released as the first single from the album. The album version of the song was made available to listen as an audio stream on 13 March 2010. A new remix, more suitable for radio airplay, was done by Cenzo Townshend whom Jim Kerr chose because of Townshend's previous work with Simple Minds' latest album Graffiti Soul. A promotional single with the new radio mixes of the song was shipped to radio stations on 4 April 2010.
"Shadowland" was originally meant to be released as a commercial physical release, but it was eventually only released as a download single on 9 May 2010. The three tracks on the download single were the same three tracks previously available on the "Shadowland" radio promo single.

The album version of "Refugee" was premiered on Billy Sloan's show on 7 March 2010. A week later, the full album version of "Refugee" was made available as a download from the initial www.lostboyaka.com website. On 13 April 2010 "Refugee" was released as the lead track of the Welcome Gift 1 free download twin pack which was released as part of the main website launch of www.lostboyaka.com. In addition to the previously released album version of "Refugee", the free download twin pack included the track "What Goes On" (Scary Monsters Mix), which was exclusive to this release. The package also included the artwork and a text file requesting that the tracks not be uploaded to any other site. "She Fell in Love With Silence" was released as a single on 15 August 2010. The single was released in both digital and physical formats.

Jim Kerr released his first solo album Lostboy! AKA Jim Kerr on 17 May 2010 under the name "Lostboy! AKA". Explaining the project name and ethos, he commented "I didn’t want to start a new band. I like my band (laughs)...and I didn’t want a point blank Jim Kerr solo album either."

The first Lostboy! AKA 10-date (European) tour occurred from 18 to 31 May 2010. In August 2010, Lostboy! AKA embarked on a 12-date "Electroset Radio" tour for various European/UK radio stations but the band played only 4 dates (three in Germany and one in Spain). A third Lostboy AKA! tour, a new 25-date "Electroset" (European) one (featuring Simon Hayward and Sarah Brown) was scheduled from 18 October to 3 December 2010 but the band played only nine shows before the rest of the tour was cancelled after the performance on 13 November 2010 in Dublin, Ireland because of Jim's mother Irene who had become ill with a recurrence of cancer. The second Lostboy! album, The Return Of The Lostboy!, was first mentioned by Jim Kerr in February 2010 during the post-production work on the first album. Jim Kerr wrote, demoed or recorded up to 25 songs for the new album. Its release was planned after Simple Minds' 2013 world tour but was indefinitely postponed.

=== Other work ===
Kerr helped organise a 90th birthday party for Nelson Mandela at Hyde Park, London on 27 June 2008. The event came 20 years after Kerr and Simple Minds played a role (releasing the single "Mandela Day" amongst other activities) in the 70th birthday concert at Wembley Stadium, which was held to demand Mandela's release. Mandela attended the 2008 event in person.

The 2006 single "The Deep Blue Sea" by Dutch singer-songwriter Mir, formerly of the band Twarres, features a vocal collaboration with Kerr.

== Personal life ==
Kerr married Chrissie Hynde, lead singer of the Pretenders, in 1984. They divorced in 1990. They had one daughter, born in 1985. He subsequently married actress Patsy Kensit in 1992 and divorced in 1996.

Kerr is a Celtic fan. In 1998 he was part of a consortium including former player Kenny Dalglish which unsuccessfully tried to take over the club.

Kerr's brother Mark is also a musician, playing in groups such as the hard rock band Gun.

Kerr lives with his Japanese partner Yumi in Taormina, Sicily, where he owns the hotel Villa Angela. He has Italian citizenship.

== Discography ==
=== Studio albums ===
List of studio albums, with selected details and peak chart positions
| Title | Album details | Peak chart positions | | | | | | |
| Title | Album details | UK | UK Ind. | BEL (FL) | BEL (WA) | FRA | GER | ITA |
|---|---|---|---|---|---|---|---|---|
| Lostboy! AKA Jim Kerr | Released: 17 May 2010; Label: earMusic | 94 | 8 | 46 | 14 | 149 | 60 | 46 |

=== Singles ===
List of singles
| Title | Year | Album |
|---|---|---|
| "Shadowland" | 2010 | Lostboy! AKA Jim Kerr |
| "Refugee" | 2010 | Lostboy! AKA Jim Kerr |
| "She Fell in Love with Silence" | 2010 | Lostboy! AKA Jim Kerr |

== See also ==
- Clan Kerr
