= Live in the City of Light =

Live album by Simple Minds
- Released: 26 May 1987
- Recorded: 12 & 13 August (mostly), October 1986
- Venues: Le Zénith, Paris, France (mostly); Sydney Entertainment Centre, Sydney, Australia
- Genre: Rock
- Length: 82:22
- Label: Virgin – SMDL 1
- Producer: Bruce Lampcov

Simple Minds chronology
Once Upon a Time (1985)	Live in the City of Light (1987)	Street Fighting Years (1989)

Singles from Live in the City of Light
- 1. "Promised You a Miracle" Released: 8 June 1987

Professional ratings
Review scores
Source	Rating
AllMusic	2.5/5 stars
CMJ	(favourable)
Martin C. Strong	6/10
Q	4/5 stars
Record Mirror	4/5 stars
Smash Hits	6/10

Live in the City of Light is the first (double LP / CD) live album by Scottish rock band Simple Minds. It was released in May 1987 to document their successful worldwide Once Upon a Time tour, and charted at No. 1 in the UK. The album spawned one chart single release, a live version of "Promised You a Miracle".

== Overview ==
The album was recorded live mainly on 12 & 13 August 1986 at Le Zénith, Paris, France (Paris is nicknamed "La Ville de Lumière" which means "The City of Light", hence the album title), on the last dates of the Once Upon a Time world tour, with only the track "Someone, Somewhere In Summertime" recorded in late October 1986 at Sydney Entertainment Centre in Sydney, Australia. It features the band's 1986 touring lineup, which included second vocalist Robin Clark and percussionist Sue Hadjopoulos. Additional "fixing and mixing" was done at Castle Sound Studios in Edinburgh and Bearsville Studios in Bearsville, New York. Lisa Germano (at the time, a John Mellencamp band member who would perform on Simple Minds' next studio single, Belfast Child), contributed studio-overdubbed violin on "Someone Somewhere in Summertime" and former Simple Minds member Derek Forbes contributed uncredited bass guitar overdubs.

== Album cover ==
Although the album was not recorded there, the inside of the gatefold sleeve curiously features a photograph taken at another show from the same Once Upon A Time tour: on 9 July 1986 at Piazza Grande, a square in Locarno, Switzerland.

== Release details ==
Live in the City of Light was released as a double vinyl album with the band's logo in gold lettering over black sleeve. The package featured a 12" x 12" attached giant-sized booklet with state-of-the-art photography of the band's performance and outdoor session pictures. This art could not be reproduced faithfully on later CD releases (an original 1st pressing on double-fat jewel case and the USA version packaged in a long box on two separate discs).

== Track listing ==
All tracks recorded live on 12 & 13 August 1986 at Le Zénith, Paris, France except "Someone, Somewhere In Summertime" recorded live on 24 (or 30) October 1986 at the Entertainment Centre, Sydney, Australia.

=== Side one ===
No.	Title	Length
1.	"Ghost Dancing"	7:22
2.	"Big Sleep"	4:27
3.	"Waterfront"	5:21
4.	"Promised You a Miracle"	4:38

=== Side two ===
No.	Title	Length
5.	"Someone Somewhere in Summertime"	5:59
6.	"Oh Jungleland"	6:35
7.	"Alive and Kicking"	6:27

=== Side three ===
No.	Title	Length
8.	"Don't You (Forget About Me)"	6:37
9.	"Once Upon a Time"	6:06
10.	"Book of Brilliant Things"	4:53
11.	"East at Easter"	4:20

=== Side four ===
No.	Title	Length
12.	"Sanctify Yourself"	7:06
13.	"Love Song" - "Sun City" - "Dance to the Music"	7:02
14.	"New Gold Dream (81/82/83/84)"	5:31

== Complete setlist of the shows on 12 & 13 August 1986 in Paris, France ==
1. Intro / Waterfront
2. Speed Your Love To Me (missing track on the live album)
3. Come A Long Way (missing track on the live album)
4. Book Of Brilliant Things
5. Ghost Dancing
6. Don't You (Forget About Me)
7. Big Sleep
8. Promised You A Miracle
9. Hunter And The Hunted (missing track on the live album)
10. Once Upon A Time
11. Oh Jungleland
12. All The Things She Said (missing track on the live album)
13. Alive And Kicking
14. New Gold Dream (81/82/83/84)
15. Someone Somewhere (In Summertime)
16. Sanctify Yourself
17. East At Easter
18. Medley: Love Song / Sun City / Thank You / Dance To The Music

== Personnel ==
Adapted from the album's liner notes.

Simple Minds

- Jim Kerr – vocals
- Charlie Burchill – guitars
- Michael MacNeil – keyboards, piano
- Mel Gaynor – drums, backing vocals
- John Giblin – bass

Additional personnel

- Robin Clark – additional vocals
- Sue Hadjopoulos – percussion
- Lisa Germano – studio-overdubbed violin on "Someone Somewhere in Summertime"
- Derek Forbes – bass overdubs on "Promised You a Miracle" and "Someone Somewhere in Summertime" (uncredited)

Technical

- Bruce Lampcov – producer, mixing
- Steve Riddle – engineer
- Douglas Cowan – computer work
- Callum Malcolm – assistant engineer (Castle Sound Studios)
- Tom Cadley – assistant engineer (Bearsville Studios)
- Bob Ludwig – mastering
- Malcolm Garrett – sleeve
- Guido Harari – photography
- William F. Ryan – "Claddagh" drawing
- Mick Haggerty – original Simple Minds logo

== Charts ==
=== Weekly charts ===
Chart (1987)	Peak position
Australian Albums (Kent Music Report)	13
Austrian Albums (Ö3 Austria)	10
Canada Top Albums/CDs (RPM)	26
Dutch Albums (Album Top 100)	1
Finnish Albums (The Official Finnish Charts)	17
German Albums (Offizielle Top 100)	3
Italian Albums (Musica e Dischi)	6
New Zealand Albums (RMNZ)	14
Norwegian Albums (VG-lista)	6
Swedish Albums (Sverigetopplistan)	5
Swiss Albums (Schweizer Hitparade)	5
UK Albums (Official Charts)	1
US Billboard 200	96

Chart (2025)	Peak position
Greek Albums (IFPI)	3

=== Year-end charts ===
Chart (1987)	Position
UK Albums (OCC)	22

== Certifications ==
Region	Certification	Certified units/sales
France (SNEP)	Gold	100,000^{*}
Germany (BVMI)	Gold	250,000^{^}
Netherlands (NVPI)	Gold	50,000^{^}
United Kingdom (BPI)	2× Platinum	600,000^{^}
^{*} Sales figures based on certification alone.^{^} Shipments figures based on certification alone.
