= Glittering Prize 81/92 =

Greatest hits album by Simple Minds
- Released: 12 October 1992
- Recorded: 1981–1991
- Genre: Rock
- Length: 72:55
- Label: Virgin
- Producer: Jimmy Iovine; Bob Clearmountain; Trevor Horn; Steve Lillywhite; Peter Walsh; Steve Lipson

Simple Minds chronology
Real Life (1991)	Glittering Prize 81/92 (1992)	Good News from the Next World (1995)

Singles from Glittering Prize
- 1. "Love Song / Alive and Kicking" Released: 28 September 1992

Professional ratings
Review scores
Source	Rating
AllMusic	3.5/5 stars
CMJ	(mixed)
Martin C. Strong	(9/10)
NME	6/10
Q	(mixed)

Glittering Prize 81/92 is a compilation album by Simple Minds, released in October 1992.

It spans the period from Sons and Fascination/Sister Feelings Call (the first album recorded by Simple Minds for Virgin Records) to Real Life.

The album omits the earliest period of Simple Minds' recording career, which yielded three albums released on Arista (only reissues are on Virgin).

At the time of its release, the album was promoted by the double A-side single "Love Song/Alive and Kicking", where "Love Song" appeared in a remixed form. Both "Love Song" (from 1981) and "Alive and Kicking" (from 1985) appear in their original 7-inch edits on the album.

The namesake video collection, featuring promo videos and various live versions, was released simultaneously.

== Track listing ==
=== Europe and Canada ===
All tracks are written by Simple Minds; except where indicated.

No.	Title	Writer(s)	Album	Length
1.	"Waterfront"		Sparkle in the Rain 1984	4:50
2.	"Don't You (Forget About Me)" (7" edit)	Forsey, Schiff	The Breakfast Club Soundtrack 1985	4:20
3.	"Alive and Kicking" (7" edit; original)	Burchill, Gaynor, Giblin, Kerr, MacNeil	Once Upon a Time 1985	4:47
4.	"Sanctify Yourself" (7" edit)		Once Upon a Time	3:57
5.	"Love Song" (7" edit; original)		Sons and Fascination/Sister Feelings Call 1981	3:51
6.	"Someone, Somewhere in Summertime"		New Gold Dream (81–82–83–84) 1982	4:36
7.	"See the Lights"	Burchill, Kerr	Real Life 1991	4:23
8.	"Belfast Child"	Simple Minds, Traditional	Street Fighting Years 1989	6:41
9.	"The American" (7" edit; original)		Sons and Fascination/Sister Feelings Call	3:33
10.	"All the Things She Said"	Burchill, Gaynor, Giblin, Kerr, MacNeil	Once Upon a Time	4:17
11.	"Promised You a Miracle" (7" edit; original)		New Gold Dream (81–82–83–84)	4:00
12.	"Ghost Dancing"		Once Upon a Time	4:45
13.	"Speed Your Love to Me"		Sparkle in the Rain	4:25
14.	"Glittering Prize" (7" edit; original)		New Gold Dream (81–82–83–84)	4:00
15.	"Let There Be Love" (7" edit; original)	Burchill, Kerr	Real Life	4:43
16.	"Mandela Day"		Street Fighting Years	5:41

=== United States ===
No.	Title	Writer(s)	Length
1.	"Alive and Kicking" (7" edit)	Burchill, Gaynor, Giblin, Kerr, MacNeil	4:47
2.	"See the Lights"	Burchill, Kerr	4:24
3.	"Don't You (Forget About Me)" (7" edit)	Forsey, Schiff	4:21
4.	"Promised You a Miracle" (7" edit)		4:00
5.	"Sanctify Yourself" (7" edit)		3:57
6.	"Belfast Child"	Simple Minds, Traditional	6:41
7.	"Stand by Love" (7" edit; originally from Real Life, 1991)		4:07
8.	"Up on the Catwalk" (7" edit; originally from Sparkle in the Rain, 1984)		4:06
9.	"Let There Be Love"	Burchill, Kerr	4:43
10.	"All the Things She Said"	Burchill, Gaynor, Giblin, Kerr, MacNeil	4:18
11.	"Someone, Somewhere in Summertime"		4:37
12.	"Waterfront"		4:49

=== Australia CD/LP and Europe LP ===
No.	Title	Writer(s)	Length
1.	"Waterfront"		4:50
2.	"Don't You (Forget About Me)" (7" edit)	Forsey, Schiff	4:21
3.	"Alive and Kicking" (7" edit)	Burchill, Gaynor, Giblin, Kerr, MacNeil	4:47
4.	"Sanctify Yourself" (7" edit)		3:57
5.	"Love Song" (7" edit)		3:51
6.	"See the Lights"	Burchill, Kerr	4:24
7.	"Belfast Child"	Simple Minds, Traditional	6:40
8.	"Someone, Somewhere in Summertime"		4:37
9.	"The American" (7" edit)		3:33
10.	"All the Things She Said"	Burchill, Gaynor, Giblin, Kerr, MacNeil	4:18
11.	"Promised You a Miracle" (7" edit)		4:00
12.	"Ghostdancing"		4:45
13.	"Glittering Prize" (7" edit)		4:00
14.	"Let There Be Love"	Burchill, Kerr	4:44

== Chart positions ==
=== Weekly charts ===
Chart (1992)	Peak position
Australia ARIA Albums Chart	1
Austrian Albums (Ö3 Austria)	29
Belgian Albums (Ultratop Flanders)	35
France SNEP Compilation Albums Chart	2
Netherlands MegaCharts Albums Chart	7
New Zealand Official New Zealand Music Chart	1
Scottish Albums (OCC)	33
Sweden Topplistan Albums Chart	17
Switzerland Swiss Hitparade Albums Chart	14
UK Albums Chart	1

=== Year-end charts ===
Chart (1992)	Peak position
UK Albums (OCC)	4

== Certifications ==
Region	Certification	Certified units/sales
Australia (ARIA)	Platinum	70,000^{^}
Canada (Music Canada)	Gold	50,000^{^}
France (SNEP)	Platinum	300,000^{*}
Germany (BVMI)	Gold	250,000^{^}
Netherlands (NVPI)	Platinum	100,000^{^}
New Zealand (RMNZ)	Platinum	15,000^{^}
Sweden (GLF)	Gold	50,000^{^}
United Kingdom (BPI)	3× Platinum	900,000^{^}
^{*} Sales figures based on certification alone.^{^} Shipments figures based on certification alone.
