= East Side Beat =

Italian dance-pop music project

- Origin: Italy
- Genres: Eurodance, dance-pop
- Years active: 1991–1995
- Label: Media Records
- Past members: Carl Fanini; Francesco Petrocchi

East Side Beat were an Italian music group, which achieved success in Europe in the early 1990s. Fronted by a line up of Italian-American vocalist Carl Fanini and Italian keyboardist Francesco Petrocchi, the act was masterminded by producers Giovanni Cinaglia and Luca Capretti. Signed to Gianfranco Bortolotti's Media Records, they released their first single in 1991. This was a dance cover of Christopher Cross's "Ride Like the Wind" and became a hit throughout Europe, peaking at No.3 in the UK, which was to be their biggest market.

Following this, the act concentrated on dance versions of past hits by other artists. They scored two more hits in the UK: a cover of Simple Minds' "Alive and Kicking" in 1992 and Lee Garrett's "You're My Everything" in 1993. Other singles released by the duo included "I Didn't Know" (1992) and "So Good" (1994). The act released one album in 1993.

With no more hits after 1993, the act disbanded in 1995. Vocalist Fanini meanwhile also recorded with Clubhouse who scored a UK top ten hit with "Light My Fire" in 1994 as well as two subsequent hits.

== Discography ==
=== Album ===
- 1993: East Side Beat (Airplay Records)

=== Singles ===
- 1991: "Divin' in the Beat"
- 1991: "Ride Like the Wind" (UK 3, IRE 4, BEL 4, NL 6, GER 24, AT 29, SWITZ 23, ESP 4)
- 1992: "I Didn't Know"
- 1992: "Alive and Kicking" (UK 26, BEL 19, NL 20 IRE 28)
- 1993: "You're My Everything" (UK 65)
- 1993: "My Girl"
- 1994: "So Good"
- 1995: "Back for Good"
- 1995: "I Want to Know What Love Is"
