= Sacrosanct (album) =

Studio album by Simple Minds
- Released: 29 January 2027
- Recorded: 2026
- Label: BMG

Simple Minds chronology
Live in the City of Diamonds (2025)	Sacrosanct (2027)

Singles from Sacrosanct
- 1. "Beginner Boys" Released: 3 September 2026; 2. "Elysium" Released: 13 November 2026

Sacrosanct is the upcoming twentieth studio album by Scottish rock band Simple Minds, due to be released on 29 January 2027 by BMG.

== Background ==
On 3 September 2026, the band announced that their upcoming twentieth studio album, Sacrosanct, would be released on 29 January 2027, featuring eight new songs.

== Songs ==
"Our Secrets Are the Same" is the title song from the band's album Our Secrets Are The Same recorded in 1999/2000 and released in 2004 (as part of the five-CD box set compilation Silver Box) and one of Jim Kerr's favourites from this period. It was never included on this album and, thus, had remained unreleased ever since until its inclusion on Sacrosanct a quarter of century later.

== Singles ==
"Beginner Boys", the album's first single, premiered on 3 September 2026, the same day as the album announcement. On 18 September 2026, 'Beginner Boys' was announced as BBC Radio 2's "Record Of The Week".

On 6 November 2026, it was announced the upcoming release on Friday 13 November 2026 of "Elysium", the second single from the album.

== Track listing ==
All tracks are written by Charlie Burchill and Jim Kerr, except where noted.

Sacrosanct – Standard edition
No.	Title	Length
1.	"Elysium"	4:39
2.	"King of the Underworld"
3.	"Beginner Boys"	4:15
4.	"Jerusalem (State of Mind)"
5.	"Our Secrets Are the Same"
6.	"Songs"
7.	"Alive in This Moment"
8.	"The Next Right Thing"

== Personnel ==
Simple Minds

- Jim Kerr – vocals, backing vocals
- Charlie Burchill – guitars, keyboards
