= Robin Clark =

American vocalist

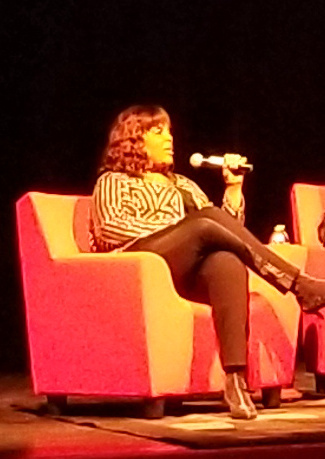
- Clark, in 2019.

Background information
- Born: 1949 or 1950 (age 75–76)
- Years active: 1969–present
- Spouse: Carlos Alomar (m. 1970)
- Website: robinclarkmusic.com

Robin Clark is an American vocalist known for her work as a vocalist on David Bowie's 1975 album Young Americans and Simple Minds' 1985 album Once Upon a Time.

Clark was born in New York. In 1967, when Clark was 17, she and future singer and songwriter Luther Vandross worked together after school in the stockroom at Alexander's department store in the Bronx. They started singing together and then joined a 16-member group called Listen My Brother, which was managed by the owners of the Apollo Theatre. Clark began dating Puerto Rican Listen My Brother member and guitarist Carlos Alomar, and they were married in 1970.

Clark appeared with Vandross and Alomar on David Bowie's album Young Americans, and her backing vocals can be heard on the album's title song.

Since 1969, Clark has performed vocals on tours, albums, radio and television shows and commercials, including the TV jingle "Jamaica One Love" for the Jamaica Tourist Board. She has also performed vocals for movie soundtracks, and has appeared in films and videos.

Clark performed as a guest vocalist on the 1985 Simple Minds album Once Upon a Time. Although the Orlando Sentinel felt that the album producers "muddied everything up" to produce an album that lacked cohesion, its columnist stated in November 1985 that Clark added a touch to the album's crisp, clear sound that "makes me wish Simple Minds would employ more women." Clark was featured in Simple Minds music videos "All the Things She Said", "Alive and Kicking" and "Sanctify Yourself". From 1985 to 1986, Clark was featured during the band's "Once Upon A Time" world tour and on the subsequent 1987 live concert album Live in the City of Light, which was recorded in Paris and Sydney in 1986. In 2013, Clark appeared in the BBC documentary David Bowie's 5 Years.
