= Once Upon a Time (Simple Minds album) =

Studio album by Simple Minds
- Released: 21 October 1985
- Recorded: May–September 1985
- Studios: The Town House, London
- Genres: Arena rock; new wave
- Length: 40:12
- Labels: Virgin; A&M (US)
- Producers: Jimmy Iovine; Bob Clearmountain

Simple Minds chronology
Sparkle in the Rain (1984)	Once Upon a Time (1985)	Live in the City of Light (1987)

Simple Minds studio albums chronology
Sparkle in the Rain (1984)	Once Upon a Time (1985)	Street Fighting Years (1989)

Singles from Once Upon a Time
- 1. "Alive and Kicking" Released: September 1985; 2. "Sanctify Yourself" Released: January 1986; 3. "All the Things She Said" Released: March 1986; 4. "Ghost Dancing" Released: November 1986

Alternative cover
- Alternative cover

Alternative cover
- UK picture disc cover

Once Upon a Time is the seventh studio album by the Scottish rock band Simple Minds, released on 21 October 1985 by Virgin Records (A&M in the US). Featuring the singles "Alive and Kicking", "Sanctify Yourself", "All the Things She Said" and "Ghost Dancing", it reached number one on the UK Albums Chart and peaked at No. 10 on the US Billboard 200.

== Background ==
The album paired the group with producer Jimmy Iovine, who had worked with artists featuring an aggressive guitar-based sound, including singer-songwriters Bruce Springsteen and Stevie Nicks, and he brought that approach to the band. Iovine pushed frontman Jim Kerr to deliver more energetic vocals.

Although already successful in their native UK and abroad, Simple Minds had also recently become popular in the US on the strength of the number one single "Don't You (Forget About Me)", written by Keith Forsey and Steve Schiff and featured on the soundtrack for The Breakfast Club. Kerr and the band had recorded the song reluctantly and did not feel that it was worthy of inclusion on the album.

Once Upon a Time shares many influences with Simple Minds' previous studio album Sparkle in the Rain, which explored a similar songwriting style. It was the first album without original bassist Derek Forbes, who left the band after recording "Don't You (Forget About Me)", and was replaced by former Brand X bassist John Giblin. Forbes would later rejoin the band in 1998 for the album Neapolis.

== Singles ==
Four singles from the album were released. "Alive and Kicking" was released in advance of the album's release in September 1985, reaching number seven in the UK and number three in the US. "Sanctify Yourself" was released in January 1986, reaching number 10 in the UK and number 14 in the US. "All the Things She Said" was released in March 1986, (UK number nine, US number 28), and "Ghost Dancing" was released in November 1986 (UK number 13). All of the proceeds from "All the Things She Said" and "Ghost Dancing" were donated to Amnesty International.

"Oh Jungleland" had been planned to be released as the second single, but Virgin instead selected "Sanctify Yourself". A 7" edit, an instrumental version and an extended 12" remix of "Oh Jungleland" were prepared and the latter two tracks subsequently appeared on the "Ghost Dancing" single releases.

== Release ==
Once Upon a Time was available with two covers upon its original LP release. The alternate cover uses the back image for the front and vice versa, and also moves the Simple Minds logo to the right of the cover. The two cover images fit together when placed side by side or above each other, and the album was displayed in British record shops with the two alternating covers placed in a grid. The album cover was standardised for the original CD release and this version has since been used for the various reissues of the album. A collectable picture-disc LP was also produced. Housed in a luxury gatefold die-cut sleeve, the record featured the mottled gold effect of the sleeve. A unique lyrics sheet was also packaged in the gatefold. A magnetic jigsaw puzzle was also produced by Virgin Records to promote the album.

The album has been rereleased in remastered form several times, most recently in 2015. Virgin Records reissued the album as a remastered edition in 2002 (cardboard vinyl replica edition) and early 2003 (jewel case). It was released on SACD in 2003. In 2005, Virgin released the completely remixed album in DVD-Audio format. All of the tracks were remixed in 5.1 surround sound, and a downmixed 2.0 stereo version was created for compatibility with DVD-Audio setups without surround sound. The tracks on the remixed album differ in length in comparison to those on the original version, with most longer than in the original mix. In 2012, the original eight-track album was included in the box set 5 Album Set, which also included four other Simple Minds albums: Sons and Fascination, New Gold Dream (81/82/83/84), Sparkle in the Rain and Street Fighting Years. On 4 December 2015, multiple formats of the album were reissued as Deluxe and Super Deluxe editions, including a double CD digipack and a five-5 CD/one-DVD boxset.

== Reception ==
Professional ratings
Review scores
Source	Rating
AllMusic	4.5/5 stars
Classic Rock	4/5 stars
Mojo	3/5 stars
Q	3/5 stars
Record Collector	4/5 stars
Record Mirror	4/5
The Rolling Stone Album Guide	3.5/5 stars
Smash Hits	7/10
Uncut	6/10
The Village Voice	B−

AllMusic critic MacKenzie Wilson wrote that the album provided a "raw energy and solid composition not entirely captured on previous albums."

Armond White of Spin wrote: "Every cut is neat and punchy pomp in the name of Bono. Kerr works up a cheerleader rock star's mechanical pep, displaying good-time intentions in the same dumb, obvious way. The album sucks up love, politics, and religion into a swirling vacuum of show-off musicianship."

== Track listing ==
All tracks are credited to Simple Minds as a band on the album, although Jim Kerr, Charlie Burchill and Mick MacNeil are listed in the ASCAP database as the writers.

Derek Forbes has commented that he contributed to part of the songwriting for Once Upon a Time but remained uncredited. The songs "All the Things She Said" and "I Wish You Were" date back to a previous group writing session at the Chapel in Lincolnshire in 1983, while Forbes was still in the band; while "Ghost Dancing" is a rewrite of "I Travel", the opening track of Simple Minds' 1980 album Empires and Dance.

Side A
No.	Title	Length
1.	"Once Upon a Time"	5:45
2.	"All the Things She Said"	4:15
3.	"Ghost Dancing"	4:45
4.	"Alive and Kicking"	5:26

Side B
No.	Title	Length
5.	"Oh Jungleland"	5:14
6.	"I Wish You Were Here"	4:42
7.	"Sanctify Yourself"	4:57
8.	"Come a Long Way"	5:07

Deluxe Edition Disc 1: The Original Album
No.	Title	Length
1.	"Once Upon a Time"	5:45
2.	"All the Things She Said"	4:15
3.	"Ghost Dancing"	4:45
4.	"Alive and Kicking"	5:26
5.	"Oh Jungleland"	5:14
6.	"I Wish You Were Here"	4:42
7.	"Sanctify Yourself"	4:57
8.	"Come a Long Way"	5:07

Deluxe Edition Disc 2: B-Sides and Rarities
No.	Title	Writer(s)	Length
1.	"Don't You (Forget About Me)"	Keith Forsey, Steve Schiff	4:23
2.	"A Brass Band in Africa"	Charlie Burchill, Derek Forbes, Jim Kerr, Mel Gaynor, Michael MacNeil	5:11
3.	"Don't You (Forget About Me)" (Extended)	Keith Forsey, Steve Schiff	6:36
4.	"A Brass Band in African Chimes"	Charlie Burchill, Derek Forbes, Jim Kerr, Mel Gaynor, Michael MacNeil	9:23
5.	"Alive and Kicking" (Edit)		4:49
6.	"Alive and Kicking" (Instrumental)		6:11
7.	"Up on the Catwalk" (Live)	Charlie Burchill, Derek Forbes, Jim Kerr, Mel Gaynor, Michael MacNeil	5:54
8.	"Alive and Kicking" (7" Remix, previously unreleased)		4:48
9.	"Alive and Kicking" (12" Remix, previously unreleased)		6:22
10.	"Alive and Kicking" (Kevorkian 12" Remix, previously unreleased)		6:38
11.	"Sanctify Yourself" (Edit)		3:54
12.	"Sanctify Yourself" (Instrumental)		3:59
13.	"Sanctify Yourself" (Alternative Edit, previously unreleased)		4:00

Deluxe Edition Disc 3: B-Sides and Rarities
No.	Title	Writer(s)	Length
1.	"Street Hassle" (Live)	Lou Reed	7:29
2.	"Love Song" (Live)	Brian McGee, Charlie Burchill, Derek Forbes, Jim Kerr, Michael MacNeil	5:43
3.	"Sanctify Yourself" (Extended)		7:13
4.	"Sanctify Yourself" (Dub)		6:14
5.	"All the Things She Said" (Edit)		4:00
6.	"Promised You a Miracle" (US Remix)	Charlie Burchill, Derek Forbes, Jim Kerr, Michael MacNeil	6:04
7.	"All the Things She Said" (Extended)		5:12
8.	"Don't You (Forget About Me)" (Live)	Keith Forsey, Steve Schiff	9:05
9.	"Ghost Dancing" (Special Extended 12" Remix)		7:20
10.	"Ghost Dancing" (Instrumental)		4:52
11.	"Oh Jungleland" (Special Extended 12" Remix)		7:23
12.	"Oh Jungleland" (Instrumental)		6:05

Deluxe Edition Disc 4: Live in the City of Light (Live from Le Zenith, Paris ‘86)
No.	Title	Writer(s)	Length
1.	"Ghost Dancing"		7:22
2.	"Big Sleep"	Charlie Burchill, Derek Forbes, Jim Kerr, Michael MacNeil	4:27
3.	"Waterfront"	Charlie Burchill, Derek Forbes, Jim Kerr, Mel Gaynor, Michael MacNeil	5:21
4.	"Promised You a Miracle"	Charlie Burchill, Derek Forbes, Jim Kerr, Michael MacNeil	4:38
5.	"Someone Somewhere in Summertime"	Charlie Burchill, Derek Forbes, Jim Kerr, Michael MacNeil	5:59
6.	"Oh Jungleland"		6:35
7.	"Alive and Kicking"		6:25

Deluxe Edition Disc 5: Live in the City of Light (Live from Le Zenith, Paris ‘86)
No.	Title	Writer(s)	Length
1.	"Don't You (Forget About Me)"	Keith Forsey, Steve Schiff	6:37
2.	"Once Upon a Time"		6:06
3.	"Book of Brilliant Things"	Charlie Burchill, Derek Forbes, Jim Kerr, Mel Gaynor, Michael MacNeil	4:53
4.	"East at Easter"	Charlie Burchill, Derek Forbes, Jim Kerr, Mel Gaynor, Michael MacNeil	4:20
5.	"Sanctify Yourself"		7:06
6.	"Love Song / Sun City / Dance to the Music"	Brian McGee, Charlie Burchill, Derek Forbes, Jim Kerr, Michael MacNeil, Steve Van Zandt, Sylvester Stewart	7:02
7.	"New Gold Dream (81–82–83–84)"	Charlie Burchill, Derek Forbes, Jim Kerr, Michael MacNeil	5:29

Deluxe Edition Disc 6 (DVD): 5.1 Mix and Promo Videos
No.	Title	Writer(s)	Length
1.	"Once Upon a Time" (5.1 Mix)		6:20
2.	"All the Things She Said" (5.1 Mix)		4:23
3.	"Ghost Dancing" (5.1 Mix)		4:47
4.	"Alive and Kicking" (5.1 Mix)		5:14
5.	"Oh Jungleland" (5.1 Mix)		5:26
6.	"I Wish You Were Here" (5.1 Mix)		4:48
7.	"Sanctify Yourself" (5.1 Mix)		5:01
8.	"Come a Long Away" (5.1 Mix)		5:24
9.	"Don't You (Forget About Me)" (Promo Video)	Keith Forsey, Steve Schiff	4:20
10.	"Alive and Kicking" (Promo Video)		5:26
11.	"Sanctify Yourself" (Promo Video)		4:00
12.	"All the Things She Said" (Promo Video)		4:16
13.	"Ghost Dancing" (Promo Video)		4:50

Note

- The Deluxe edition of Once Upon a Time consists of Disc 1 (The Original Album) and Disc 2 (B-Sides and Rarities).
- The Super Deluxe edition consists of all six discs.

== Personnel ==
Adapted from the album's liner notes:

Simple Minds

- Jim Kerr – lead vocals and backing vocals
- Charlie Burchill – electric guitars
- Michael MacNeil – synthesizers, sampler and electric piano
- John Giblin – bass
- Mel Gaynor – drums and backing vocals

Additional personnel

- Robin Clark – additional lead vocals and backing vocals
- Michael Been – backing vocals
- The Simms Brothers – backing vocals
- Carlos Alomar – backing vocals
- Sue Hadjopoulos – timbals on "All the Things She Said"

Technical

- Jimmy Iovine – producer
- Bob Clearmountain – producer
- Moira Marquis – engineer
- Mark McKenna – engineer
- Martin White – assistant engineer
- Bob Ludwig – mastering
- Mick Haggerty – artwork
- Anton Corbijn – photography

== Charts ==
=== Weekly charts ===
Chart (1985–2015)	Peak position
Australian Albums (Kent Music Report)	7
Belgian Albums (Ultratop Flanders)	199
Belgian Albums (Ultratop Wallonia)	113
Canada Top Albums/CDs (RPM)	3
Dutch Albums (Album Top 100)	1
European Albums (Eurotipsheet)	4
Finnish Albums (The Official Finnish Charts)	22
German Albums (Offizielle Top 100)	5
New Zealand Albums (RMNZ)	3
Norwegian Albums (VG-lista)	6
Swedish Albums (Sverigetopplistan)	4
Swiss Albums (Schweizer Hitparade)	7
UK Albums (Official Charts)	1
US Billboard 200	10

Chart (2025)	Peak position
German Pop Albums (Offizielle Top 100)	12

=== Year-end charts ===
Chart (1985)	Position
Canada Top Albums/CDs (RPM)	26
UK Albums (OCC)	36

Chart (1986)	Position
Canada Top Albums/CDs (RPM)	31
Dutch Albums (Album Top 100)	17
European Albums (Music & Media)	8
German Albums (Offizielle Top 100)	54
New Zealand Albums (RMNZ)	33
UK Albums (OCC)	21
US Billboard 200	24

=== Singles ===
Year	Single	Chart	Position
1985	"Alive and Kicking"	UK Singles Chart	7
1985	"Alive and Kicking"	US Billboard Hot 100	3
1985	"Alive and Kicking"	US Billboard Mainstream Rock Tracks	2
1986	"Sanctify Yourself"	UK Singles Chart	10
1986	"Sanctify Yourself"	US Billboard Hot 100	14
1986	"Sanctify Yourself"	US Mainstream Rock Tracks	3
1986	"All the Things She Said"	UK Singles Chart	9
1986	"All the Things She Said"	US Billboard Hot 100	28
1986	"All the Things She Said"	US Mainstream Rock Tracks	9
1986	"Ghost Dancing"	UK Singles Chart	13

== Certifications ==
Region	Certification	Certified units/sales
Belgium (BRMA)	Platinum	75,000
Canada (Music Canada)	2× Platinum	200,000^{^}
France (SNEP)	Gold	100,000^{*}
Germany (BVMI)	2× Gold	500,000
Greece (IFPI Greece)	Gold	50,000^{^}
Netherlands (NVPI)	Platinum	100,000^{^}
New Zealand (RMNZ)	Platinum	15,000^{^}
Norway (IFPI Norway)	Platinum	50,000^{*}
Spain (Promusicae)	Gold	50,000^{^}
Sweden (GLF)	Gold	50,000^{^}
United Kingdom (BPI)	3× Platinum	900,000^{^}
United States (RIAA)	Gold	500,000^{^}
^{*} Sales figures based on certification alone.^{^} Shipments figures based on certification alone.
