= All the Things She Said (Simple Minds song) =

1986 single by Simple Minds

Single by Simple Minds

from the album Once Upon a Time
- B-side: "Don't You (Forget About Me)" (live)
- Released: March 1986
- Length: 4:15 (album version); 5:13 (extended version)
- Label: Virgin
- Songwriters: Jim Kerr; Charlie Burchill; Mick MacNeil
- Producers: Jimmy Iovine; Bob Clearmountain

Simple Minds singles chronology
| "Sanctify Yourself" (1986) | "All the Things She Said" (1986) | "Ghost Dancing" (1986) |

"All the Things She Said" is a song by the Scottish rock band Simple Minds, released as the third single from their seventh studio album, Once Upon a Time (1985). It was sung by lead vocalist Jim Kerr, with backing vocals provided by American singer Robin Clark, who also appeared in the promotional video. The song reached number nine on the UK singles chart and number 28 on the US Billboard Hot 100.

== Content ==
Singer Jim Kerr said the song was based on an article he read about Polish political prisoners in the Soviet Union. "There was an interview with wives of guys that had been away for a long time, taken away, and some of the beautiful quotations that the women had used became sort of the background for that song," he said.

== Charts ==
| Chart (1986) | Peak position |
|---|---|
| Australia (Kent Music Report) | 46 |
| Belgium (Ultratop 50 Flanders) | 20 |
| Canada Top Singles (RPM) | 65 |
| Ireland (IRMA) | 4 |
| Netherlands (Dutch Top 40) | 16 |
| Netherlands (Single Top 100) | 6 |
| New Zealand (Recorded Music NZ) | 20 |
| UK Singles (Official Charts) | 9 |
| US Billboard Hot 100 | 28 |
| US Mainstream Rock (Billboard) | 9 |
| US Cash Box Top 100 | 28 |
| West Germany (GfK) | 51 |

== Sales ==
| Region | Certification | Certified units/sales |
|---|---|---|
| United Kingdom | — | 134,929 |
