= Ghost Dancing =

Single by Simple Minds

from the album Once Upon a Time
- Released: 3 November 1986
- Recorded: 1985
- Genre: New wave, synth-rock, dance-rock
- Label: Virgin
- Songwriters: Jim Kerr, Charlie Burchill, Mick MacNeil
- Producers: Jimmy Iovine, Bob Clearmountain

Simple Minds singles chronology
"All the Things She Said" (1986)	"Ghost Dancing" (1986)	"Promised You a Miracle" (live)" (1987)

"Ghost Dancing" is a song written by Jim Kerr, Charlie Burchill and Mick MacNeil and recorded by Scottish rock band Simple Minds. It was released as the fourth single from the band's 1985 album Once Upon a Time. According to the band's website, the first live performance of the song was at John F. Kennedy Stadium as part of their Live Aid performance. The song also appears on their "Glittering Prize (81-92)" album. The song reached number 13 in the UK singles charts.
