= Alive and Kicking (song) =

1985 single by Simple Minds

"Alive & Kicking"

Single by Simple Minds

from the album Once Upon a Time
- B-side: "Up on the Catwalk" (live)
- Released: 30 September 1985
- Genre: Arena rock
- Length: 5:26 (album version); 4:47 (single version); 6:11 (instrumental version)
- Label: Virgin
- Songwriters: Jim Kerr; Charlie Burchill; Mick MacNeil
- Producers: Bob Clearmountain; Jimmy Iovine

Simple Minds singles chronology
"Don't You (Forget About Me)" (1985)	"Alive & Kicking" (1985)	"Sanctify Yourself" (1986)

Music video
- "Alive and Kicking" on YouTube

Audio sample
- file; help

"Alive and Kicking" is a song by the Scottish rock band Simple Minds, released in September 1985 by Virgin Records as the lead single from their seventh album, Once Upon a Time (1985). The song reached number three on the US Billboard Hot 100 and number four in Canada; it peaked within the top five of several European countries, including Italy, where it reached number one.

== Chart performance ==
Following on from the success of previous non-album single, "Don't You (Forget About Me)", "Alive and Kicking" was released as a single, reaching number three on the US Billboard Hot 100 and number one on the Top Rock Tracks chart (now called the Mainstream Rock chart). The song also reached number four in Canada. In Europe, the song topped the charts in Italy for one week, reached number two in Belgium, Ireland, and the Netherlands, and peaked at number seven on the UK Singles Chart. In 1992, when re-released as a double A-side with "Love Song" to promote the band's compilation album Glittering Prize 81/92, it managed to reach a new peak of number six. Elsewhere, "Alive and Kicking" reached number five in New Zealand, number 16 in South Africa, and just missed the top 20 in Australia, peaking at number 21.

== Music video ==
The music video for "Alive and Kicking" was filmed near the town of Hunter, at North–South Lake in the Catskill Mountains of Upstate New York. A portion of the video was filmed on the overlook at the site of the old Catskill Mountain House (previously demolished). It was directed by Zbigniew Rybczyński, who directed the video for "All the Things She Said", the third single from the same album.

== Track listings ==
- 7-inch single
1. "Alive and Kicking" (single version) (4:47)
2. "Alive and Kicking" (instrumental version) (6:01)
- 12-inch single
1. "Alive and Kicking" (5:26)
2. "Alive and Kicking" (instrumental version) (6:01)
- Second 12-inch single
1. "Alive and Kicking" (5:26)
2. "Alive and Kicking" (instrumental version) (6:01)
3. "Up on the Catwalk" (live) (5:37)

== Personnel ==
- Produced by Jimmy Iovine and Bob Clearmountain
- Engineered by Moira Marquis and Mark McKenna
- Engineering assisted by Martin White
- Words and music by Simple Minds (Kerr, Burchill, MacNeil)
- "Up on the Catwalk" recorded live at Barrowlands, Glasgow, 5 January 1985
- Backing vocals by Robin Clark

== Charts ==
=== Weekly charts ===
"Alive and Kicking"

Chart (1985–1986)	Peak position
Australia (Kent Music Report)	21
Belgium (Ultratop 50 Flanders)	2
Canada Top Singles (RPM)	4
Europe (European Hot 100 Singles)	2
France (SNEP)	33
Italy (Musica e dischi)	1
Ireland (IRMA)	2
Netherlands (Dutch Top 40)	2
Netherlands (Single Top 100)	2
New Zealand (Recorded Music NZ)	5
Norway (VG-lista)	5
South Africa (Springbok Radio)	16
Sweden (Sverigetopplistan)	11
UK Singles (Official Charts)	7
US Billboard Hot 100	3
US Mainstream Rock (Billboard)	2
West Germany (GfK)	17

"Love Song" / "Alive and Kicking"

Chart (1992)	Peak position
Ireland (IRMA)	27
UK Singles (Official Charts)	6
UK Airplay (Music Week)	45

=== Year-end charts ===
Chart (1985)	Position
Belgium (Ultratop Flanders)	20
Canada Top Singles (RPM)	43
Netherlands (Dutch Top 40)	22
Netherlands (Single Top 100)	19

Chart (1986)	Position
US Billboard Hot 100	17

== Certifications ==
Region	Certification	Certified units/sales
Brazil (Pro-Música Brasil)	Platinum	60,000^{‡}
Canada (Music Canada)	Gold	50,000^{^}
New Zealand (RMNZ)	Platinum	30,000^{‡}
United Kingdom (BPI)	Platinum	600,000^{‡}
^{^} Shipments figures based on certification alone.^{‡} Sales+streaming figures based on certification alone.

== Appearances in media ==
In 1992, "Alive & Kicking" provided the soundtrack for a famous promo, entitled "A whole new ball game" for BSkyB's launch of the FA Premier League.

== East Side Beat version ==
"Alive and Kicking"

Single by East Side Beat

from the album East Side Beat
- Released: 7 December 1992
- Length: 4:05
- Label: FFRR
- Songwriters: Jim Kerr; Charlie Burchill; Mick MacNeil
- Producer: Phil Kelsey

East Side Beat singles chronology
"I Didn't Know" (1992)	"Alive and Kicking" (1992)	"You're My Everything" (1993)

In 1992, Italian dance music group East Side Beat covered "Alive and Kicking". It was produced by Phil Kelsey and released in December by FFRR as a single from their only album, East Side Beat (1992). The song became a top-20 hit in Belgium and the Netherlands. In the UK, it reached number 26 on the UK Singles Chart. There are five remixes in total. Two versions are found on the 7-inch single and an additional three are on the CD single.

=== Charts ===
Chart (1992–1993)	Peak position
Australia (ARIA)	127
Belgium (Ultratop 50 Flanders)	19
Netherlands (Dutch Top 40)	27
Netherlands (Single Top 100)	20
UK Singles (Official Charts)	26
UK Airplay (Music Week)	40
UK Dance (Music Week)	5
UK Club Chart (Music Week)	7
