= Simple Minds =

Scottish rock band

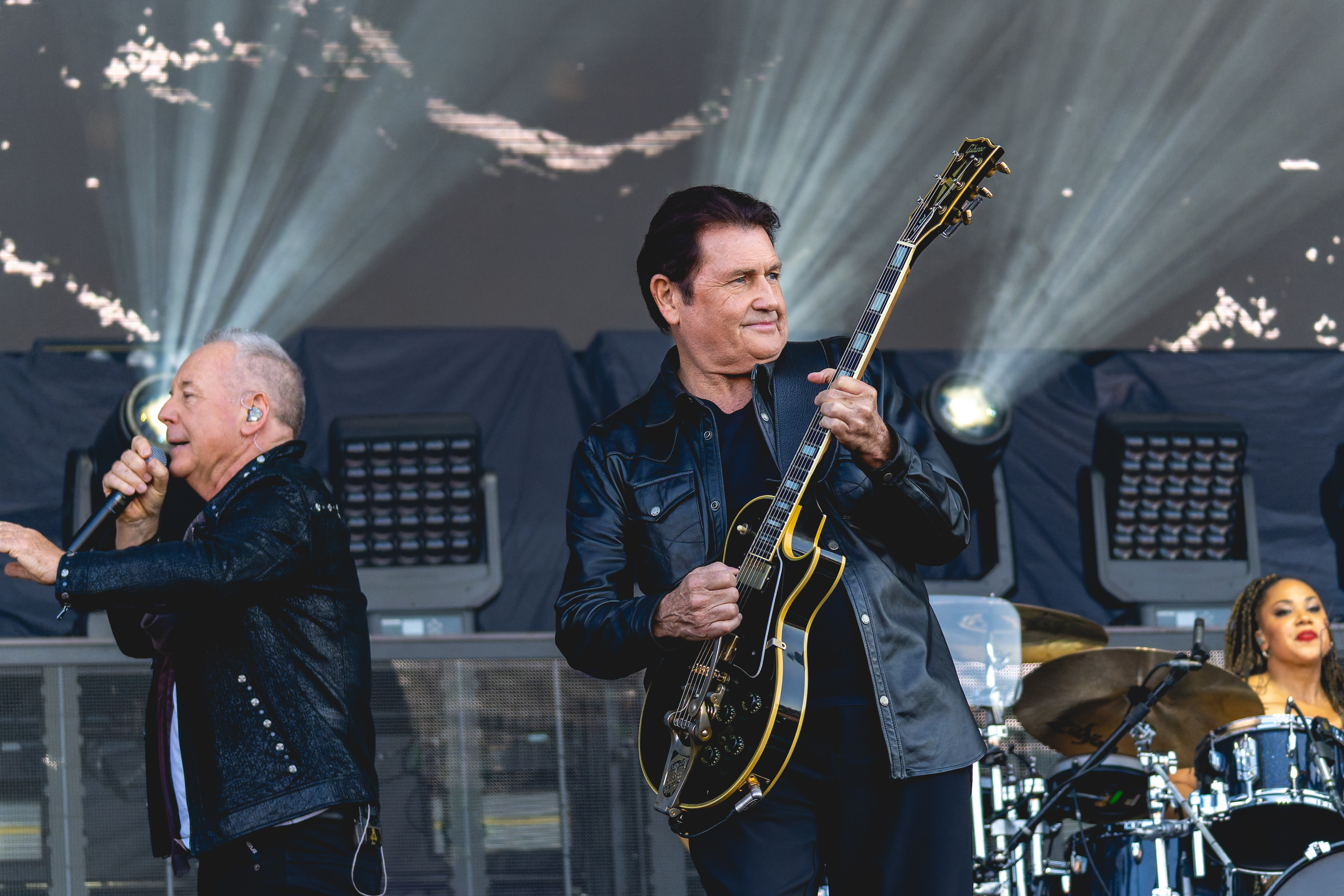
- Simple Minds performing at the Isle of Wight Festival 2024. Left to right: Jim Kerr, Charlie Burchill, Cherisse Osei

Background information
- Origin: Glasgow, Scotland
- Genres: New wave; art rock; post-punk; arena rock; synth-pop
- Years active: 1977–present
- Labels: Arista; Zoom; Virgin; A&M; Chrysalis; Eagle; BMG
- Spinoffs: Propaganda; Endgames; Ex-Simple Minds
- Spinoff of: Johnny & the Self-Abusers
- Members: Jim Kerr; Charlie Burchill
- Past members: Mick MacNeil; Derek Forbes; Brian McGee; Kenny Hyslop; Mike Ogletree; Mel Gaynor; John Giblin
- Website: www.simpleminds.com

Simple Minds are a Scottish rock band formed in Glasgow in 1977. The band is currently a core duo of original members Jim Kerr (vocals) and Charlie Burchill (guitar), augmented by guest musicians. Notable former members include Mick MacNeil (keyboards), Derek Forbes (bass), Brian McGee (drums), Mel Gaynor (drums), and John Giblin (bass).

Initially signed to Arista Records, Simple Minds released their debut album Life in a Day in 1979 to moderate commercial success, while the following two albums, Real to Real Cacophony (1979) and Empires and Dance (1980), achieved critical praise but limited sales. After signing to Virgin Records, their fourth album, Sons and Fascination/Sister Feelings Call (1981), became their first top twenty album in the UK, beginning their rise in mainstream popularity. The following album, New Gold Dream (81/82/83/84) (1982), proved their major breakthrough, reaching the top ten in the UK, Australia, New Zealand, and Sweden, as well being their first charting album on the Billboard 200 in the US. The album also produced three UK top forty singles in "Promised You a Miracle", "Glittering Prize", and "Someone Somewhere in Summertime".

Their next album, Sparkle in the Rain (1984), featured another hit single with "Waterfront" and continued the band's commercial prominence, debuting at number one in both the UK, where it was certified Platinum, and New Zealand. "Don't You (Forget About Me)", their contribution to the soundtrack of the 1985 film The Breakfast Club, became their breakthrough hit in the US, reaching number one on the Billboard Hot 100. The following album, Once Upon a Time (1985), reached number one in the UK and the Netherlands, the top three in Canada and New Zealand, and the top ten in the US. It was certified 3× Platinum in the UK and Gold in the US, and spawned four more hit singles with "Alive and Kicking", "Sanctify Yourself", "All the Things She Said" and "Ghostdancing". Their chart dominance continued with the album Street Fighting Years (1989), with its lead single "Belfast Child" reaching number one in the UK, Ireland and the Netherlands. After two more successful albums with Real Life (1991) and Good News from the Next World (1995), the band underwent a commercial decline in the late 1990s. They returned to chart prominence starting in the late 2000s, with albums such as Graffiti Soul (2009), Walk Between Worlds (2018) and Direction of the Heart (2022).

Simple Minds have sold more than 60 million albums worldwide and were the most commercially successful Scottish band of the 1980s. They were awarded the Q Inspiration Award in 2014 for their contribution to the music industry and an Ivor Novello Award in 2016 for Outstanding Song Collection from the British Academy of Songwriters, Composers, and Authors (BASCA). Their other notable recognitions include nominations for both the MTV Video Music Award for Best Direction and MTV Video Music Award for Best Art Direction for "Don't You (Forget About Me)" in 1985, and a nomination for the Brit Award for British Group in 1986. "Belfast Child" was nominated for the Song of the Year at the 1990 Brit Awards.

== History ==
=== Early years (1977–1978) ===
Simple Minds originated from a cover band called Biba-Rom! formed by school-friends Jim Kerr, Charlie Burchill, Tony Donald and Brian McGee, whose members would subsequently make up part of the punk band Johnny & The Self-Abusers, formed in early 1977 on Glasgow's South Side, as the brainchild of Alan Cairnduff. Cairnduff left the organisation of the band to John Milarky, suggesting that he enlist two strangers, singer and lyricist Jim Kerr and guitarist Charlie Burchill. Kerr and Burchill, who had been acquainted since age eight, roped in their school friends Brian McGee and Tony Donald to play drums and bass respectively. Milarky served as singer, guitarist and saxophonist, and recruited his friend Allan McNeill to be the band's third guitarist. Kerr doubled on keyboards, and Burchill also played violin.

On 11 April 1977, Johnny & The Self-Abusers held their first performance at the Doune Castle pub in Glasgow, following up two weeks later as the opening act for Generation X in Edinburgh. They performed concerts in Glasgow over the ensuing summer, but a split developed in the band, with Milarky and McNeill forming one faction and the other consisting of Kerr, Donald, Burchill and McGee; In November 1977, Johnny & The Self-Abusers released their only single, "Saints and Sinners", on Chiswick Records (which was dismissed as being "rank and file" in a Melody Maker review). The band split on the same day that the single was released, with Milarky and McNeill going on to form The Cuban Heels. Ditching the stage names and the overt punkiness, the remaining members continued together as Simple Minds (naming themselves after a David Bowie lyric from his song "The Jean Genie"), making their very first performance at Glasgow's Satellite City on 17 January 1978.

In January 1978, Simple Minds recruited Duncan Barnwell as a second guitarist (allowing for an optional two-guitar line-up while also enabling Burchill to play violin). Meanwhile, Kerr had abandoned keyboards to concentrate entirely on vocals. In March 1978, Kerr, Burchill, Donald, Barnwell and McGee were joined by the Barra-born keyboard player Mick MacNeil. The band got a residency at the Mars Bar in Glasgow and played various other venues in Scotland and rapidly established a reputation as an exciting live act (usually performing in full makeup). Tony Donald quit in April 1978 and was replaced by Duncan Barnwell's friend Derek Forbes (formerly the bass player with The Subs). In May 1978 Simple Minds recorded their first demo tape, including "Chelsea Girl" and some other tracks that would appear on their debut album. The group were turned down by record companies, but gained a management deal with Bruce Findlay, owner of the Bruce's Records chain of record shops and the Zoom Records label. Championed by his journalist friend Brian Hogg, Findlay was persuaded to sign Simple Minds to his Zoom label which had a licensing deal with Arista Records. In November 1978, Barnwell was ousted from the band.

From November 1978 through September 1981, Simple Minds would be a tight-knit quintet of Kerr, Burchill, MacNeil, Forbes and McGee. Subsequent line-up changes would shrink and diminish this core band, with only founder members being considered to be full members of the creative and compositional team.

=== Initial albums (1978–1980) ===
During late 1978 and early 1979, Simple Minds began rehearsing the set of Kerr/Burchill-written songs which appear on their debut album. On 27 March 1979 the band made their first television appearance, performing the songs "Chelsea Girl" and "Life in a Day" on the BBC's The Old Grey Whistle Test. The first Simple Minds album, Life in a Day, was produced by John Leckie and released by Zoom Records in April 1979. The album's title track "Life in a Day" was released as Simple Minds' first single and reached No. 62 in the UK singles chart, with the album reaching No. 30 in the UK Albums Chart. In April/May 1979 they played their first UK tour as supporting act for Magazine, who were a major influence on them at the time.

Simple Minds in a promotional press shoot ahead of the release of Life in a Day (c. 1979)

In June 1979 "Chelsea Girl" was released as the second single from the album, failing to reach the chart, while the band continued to tour the UK on their own. In September 1979 Simple Minds recorded their next album, Real to Real Cacophony, at Rockfield Studios with producer John Leckie. The songs were mostly conceived in the studio and was a significant departure from the pop tunes of Life in a Day. German Krautrock was now the band's main influence, adopting a more experimental electronic sound that drew influences from the motorik, repetitive grooves of bands such as Neu!, Kraftwerk and La Düsseldorf.

The band began their Real to Real Cacophony tour in Germany and also made a short visit to New York in October 1979. Their performance of the songs "Premonition", "Factory" and "Changeling" at Hurrah was filmed for The Old Grey Whistle Test.

Real to Real Cacophony was released in November 1979. While the band got little marketing support from their record company Arista, who did not like the album, it received critical acclaim. The release was followed by their third UK tour of the year and a BBC session for John Peel in December. In January 1980 "Changeling" was released as the only single from Real to Real Cacophony, failing to make an impression on the charts. In March they supported Gary Numan on a couple of gigs, and continued their Real to Real Cacophony tour until June 1980 with dates mainly in Germany, France and the Netherlands. In June 1980 Simple Minds entered the studio to record their next album, again with producer John Leckie at Rockfield Studios. The band again had a new approach to their music that differed from the previous album, this time aiming for a more repetitive, dance-orientated sound inspired by disco music they had heard in nightclubs while touring Europe.

Empires and Dance was released in September 1980. Many of the tracks were minimal and featured a significant use of sequencing, further exploring their repetitive Krautrock-influences with electronic dance grooves. McNeil's keyboards and Forbes' bass became the main melodic elements in the band's sound, with Burchill's heavily processed guitar becoming more of a textural element. With this album, Kerr began to experiment with non-narrative lyrics based on observations he had made as the band travelled across Europe on tour. While a modest commercial success, Empires and Dance received enthusiastic response in the British music press Simple Minds had caught the attention of Peter Gabriel, who selected them as the opening act on several dates of his European tour starting in August 1980. The tour as Gabriel's support act gave the band the opportunity to play at bigger venues.

Empires and Dance peaked at No. 41 on the UK Albums Chart and dropped out of the chart after three weeks. The band's manager Bruce Findlay later blamed Arista for poor handling of the album and it not being more commercially successful. Initially Arista only released 7,500 copies of the album. Furthermore, Arista did not release a single to promote the album. "I Travel" was not released as a single until October to promote the Empires and Dance tour. The single sold poorly and did not reach the UK chart, but the 12" version became popular in the US club scene and (based on import sales only) entered the Billboard Disco Chart at No. 80 in early 1981. "I Travel" was subsequently reissued twice in the UK, but again failed to reach the singles chart.

=== Virgin Records deal (1981–1982) ===
Lead singer Jim Kerr in an early promotional appearance for the band during their rise to moderate success, 1981

In early 1981, Simple Minds' frustration with poor support and marketing by Arista made them threaten to split up rather than continue working with them. They were released from Arista and instead signed to Virgin Records. After the band had left the label, Arista decided to release "Celebrate" as the second single from Empires and Dance in February 1981 to promote the album, with the earlier single "Changeling" on the b-side to promote Real to Real Cacophony, but this single too sold poorly and failed to chart. The following year, Arista put out a compilation album, Celebration, featuring tracks from the three previous albums which reached No. 45 on the UK albums chart. Following their change of record company, the band demoed new songs and embarked on a club tour in the US and Canada.

In May 1981, Simple Minds' first release on Virgin, the single "The American", reached No. 59 on the UK singles chart. The band recorded their next album with producer Steve Hillage. An abundance of new material was recorded under much time pressure, and at the end of the sessions, drummer Brian McGee decided to leave the band, citing exhaustion at Simple Minds' constant touring schedule, and a desire for more time at home with family. In an interview shortly after, he also cited disappointment that he was not getting enough credit in the band. McGee joined Glasgow band Endgames, and later Propaganda. In August, "Love Song" was released and became their highest charting single to date, peaking at No. 47 on the UK singles chart and an international hit, reaching the Top 20 in Australia and Sweden, and No. 38 in Canada.

In September 1981, Virgin released the entirety of Simple Minds recent studio sessions on two albums: Sons and Fascination and Sister Feelings Call. The albums were initially issued as a double set for the first 10,000 copies printed, after which they were made available as two separate single albums. The albums were charted together, peaking at No. 11 on the UK albums chart, and were subsequently placed as No. 18 on Sounds "Album of the Year"-chart. The next single "Sweat in Bullet" was a remixed version by Peter Walsh and included two songs recorded live at Hammersmith Odeon in September. During this period, the band's visual aesthetic was established, masterminded by Malcolm Garrett's graphic design company Assorted iMaGes. Characterised at first by hard, bold typography and photo-collage, Garrett's designs for the band later incorporated pop-religious iconography in clean, integrated package designs that befitted the band's idealised image as neo-romantic purveyors of European anthemic pop.

McGee was initially replaced by Kenny Hyslop (ex-Skids, Slik, Zones), who played on the first leg of the Sons and Fascination tour, which included Simple Minds' first visit to Australia, touring with Icehouse. Hyslop also played on the studio recording of "Promised You a Miracle", a song originating in a riff from a tape of funk music Hyslop played on the tour bus, that would become the band's next single. Despite this contribution, Hyslop ultimately "didn't fit in" with the band or their management and was replaced for the second leg of the Sons and Fascination tour by the Kilmarnock-born percussionist Mike Ogletree (the former drummer for Café Jacques) in early 1982.

=== New Gold Dream and breakthrough (1982–1983) ===
Simple Minds started working on their next album in an old farmhouse in Fife. In February 1982 the songs "Promised You a Miracle" and "King is White and in the Crowd" were premiered on a BBC session for Kid Jensen. The band then moved to Townhouse Studios for recording sessions with producer Peter Walsh. The band told Walsh they wanted the album to represent their live sound, so Walsh decided to record it as a live studio album. Unsatisfied with Ogletree's drumming style, Walsh introduced them to London-born drummer Mel Gaynor, a 22-year-old session musician with plenty of experience from playing with funk bands such as Beggar and Co and Light of the World, who then played drums on the majority of the album, while Ogletree played drums on three tracks.

"Promised You a Miracle" was released in April 1982 and became Simple Minds first Top 20 single in the UK, peaking at No. 13 and also reaching the Australian Top 10. The song earned the band performances on Top of the Pops and interviews in teen-orientated pop magazines. New Gold Dream (81–82–83–84) was released in September 1982. The album was a commercial breakthrough, spending 53 weeks on the UK Albums Chart, peaking at No. 3 in October 1982. It generated charting singles including "Glittering Prize", which reached the UK Top 20 and Australian Top 10. While some tracks ("Promised You a Miracle", "Colours Fly and Catherine Wheel") continued the formula perfected on Sons and Fascination, other tracks ("Someone Somewhere in Summertime", "Glittering Prize") were pure pop. Jazz keyboardist Herbie Hancock, who recorded in the studio next door, performed a synth solo on the track "Hunter and the Hunted".

Simple Minds in 1982

The band embarked on their extensive New Gold Dream tour in September 1982, which included dates in the UK, Australia, New Zealand and Canada. Mike Ogletree played on the first leg of the tour, but was asked to leave the band in November 1982, later joining Fiction Factory. Mel Gaynor was recruited for the remaining dates and retained afterwards, eventually becoming the band's longest-standing drummer and third longest-standing member after stalwarts Burchill and Kerr. The band's late 1982 UK dates included a show at City Hall in Newcastle that was recorded by Virgin and later included on the 2003 Seen the Lights DVD. On these dates the band was supported by China Crisis.

The second leg of the New Gold Dream tour started in March 1983 and included dates in Europe, USA and Canada. In July they performed at festivals such as Roskilde Festival in Denmark and Rock Werchter in Belgium. Prior to the tour the band had started working on their next album. In August the new song "Waterfront" was premiered in a live concert. In September the band recorded the song at a BBC session for David Jensen, along with another newly written song, "The Kick Inside of Me". In October their next album was recorded with producer Steve Lillywhite at Townhouse Studios in London. In November "Waterfront" was released as a single and became their biggest hit to date, reaching No. 1 in New Zealand, No. 5 in Ireland, the Top 20 in Australia and Sweden, and No. 13 on the UK chart. On the same day the single was released, the band embarked on their Sparkle in the Rain tour. The opening show at Barrowlands Ballroom in Glasgow was filmed for the "Waterfront" video.

=== Mainstream success (1984–1987) ===
The band released their sixth studio album, Sparkle in the Rain, in February 1984 which entered the UK albums chart at No. 1. It was preceded by the single "Speed Your Love to Me" which reached No. 20 on the singles chart. A third single from the album, "Up on the Catwalk", was subsequently released and also reached the Top 30 in the UK. Sparkle in the Rain hit the Top 20 in several other countries (including Canada, where it reached No. 13). The band spent much of 1984 touring the world, including Australia, Europe, North America and Japan. In 1984, Jim Kerr married Chrissie Hynde of the Pretenders (who renamed herself Christine Kerr). Simple Minds headlined a North American tour supported by China Crisis during the Canadian leg and supported the Pretenders in the US while Hynde was pregnant with Kerr's daughter. The marriage lasted until 1990.

Simple Minds performing "Don't You (Forget About Me)" at Live Aid from John F. Kennedy Stadium in Philadelphia, United States, 1985

Already a popular band in the UK, Europe, Canada and Australia, Simple Minds were starting to crack the US charts in 1983. The band's early UK releases on Arista were not picked up by Arista USA, who had 'right of first refusal' for their releases. By 1983, the band had moved to A&M Records in the US and began gaining traction. The band's US breakthrough finally came in 1985, thanks to one of the year's most successful films, The Breakfast Club. For the film's soundtrack, the band recorded "Don't You (Forget About Me)", a song written by Keith Forsey and Steve Schiff, which had previously been offered to Billy Idol and Bryan Ferry before being offered to Simple Minds. Released as a single, the song reached No. 1 in the US, and also became a hit in many other countries around the world, including the UK, where it became the band's first Top 10 single.

Despite this upshot in success, it was during this time that the camaraderie that had fuelled Simple Minds began to take a load on the band, and in time over the next ten years the band's line-up underwent frequent changes. Jim Kerr subsequently recalled "We were knackered. We were desensitized. The band started to fracture. We were lads who had grown up together, we were meant to grow together, politically, spiritually and artistically. But we were getting tired with each other. There was an element of the chore creeping in. We were coasting and this whole other thing was a challenge." The first casualty was bassist Derek Forbes, who was beginning to squabble with Kerr. Forbes began failing to turn up for rehearsals, and was dismissed. Forbes remained in touch with the band, and was soon reunited with another former Simple Minds bandmate, drummer Brian McGee, in Propaganda. To replace Forbes, Simple Minds hired John Giblin, who owned the band's rehearsal space. A former member of Brand X, he had most recently been working as a session musician for Peter Gabriel, Phil Collins, and Kate Bush. Giblin made his debut with Simple Minds at Live Aid in Philadelphia, where the band performed "Don't You (Forget About Me)", a new track called "Ghost Dancing" and "Promised You a Miracle".

During 1985, Simple Minds were in the studio with former Tom Petty/Stevie Nicks producer Jimmy Iovine. In November, Once Upon a Time was released. Former Chic singer Robin Clark performed call-and-response vocals with Kerr throughout the album, effectively becoming a second lead singer, and was heavily featured in the music videos. Once Upon a Time reached No. 1 in the UK and No. 10 in the US, despite the fact that their major-league breakthrough single "Don't You (Forget About Me)" was not included. The album generated four worldwide hit singles: "Alive and Kicking", "Sanctify Yourself", "Ghost Dancing" and "All the Things She Said", the last of which featured a music video directed by Zbigniew Rybczyński that used techniques developed in music videos for bands such as Pet Shop Boys and Art of Noise. The band also toured, with both Robin Clark and percussionist Sue Hadjopoulos added to the live line-up.

Because of Simple Minds' powerful stage presence and lyrics that were now beginning to adopt Christian symbolism, the band was criticised by some in the music press as a lesser version of U2, despite the fact that both bands were now heading in different musical directions. The two groups were well-acquainted with one another, and Bono joined Simple Minds on-stage at the Barrowlands in Glasgow in 1985 for a live version of "New Gold Dream". Bono also appeared on stage at Simple Minds' Croke Park concert and sang Steven Van Zandt's "Sun City" during the "Love Song" medley. Derek Forbes also appeared on stage at the Croke Park concert and performed on several songs during the encore. To document their worldwide Once Upon a Time tour, Simple Minds released the double-live album Live in the City of Light in May 1987, which was recorded primarily over two nights in Paris in August 1986.

=== Political activism, continued success and hiatus (1988–1993) ===
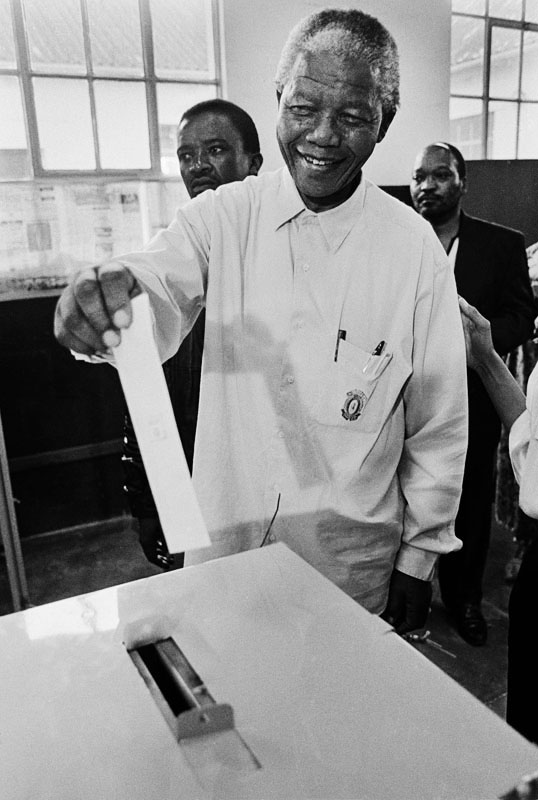
Simple Minds wrote the song "Mandela Day" as a homage to South African President Nelson Mandela

By 1988, Simple Minds had built their own recording premises – the Bonnie Wee Studio – in Scotland. Following the lengthy period of touring to support Once Upon a Time, Kerr, Burchill and MacNeil began new writing sessions in Scotland, while Gaynor and Giblin pursued session work elsewhere while waiting to be called in. Initially the band began work on an instrumental project called Aurora Borealis (mostly written by Burchill and MacNeil). This project was then supplanted by an increase in the band's political activism, something which they had begun to stress in recent years (by giving all of the income from the "Ghost Dancing" single to Amnesty International, and playing Steven Van Zandt's "Sun City" on tour), inspired by Peter Gabriel with whom they had toured in the early 1980s.

Simple Minds were the first band to sign up for Mandela Day, a concert held at Wembley Stadium, London, as an expression of solidarity with the then-imprisoned Nelson Mandela. Bands involved were asked to produce a song especially for the event – Simple Minds were the only act which produced one. This was "Mandela Day", which the band played live on the day. Steven Van Zandt joined the band for "Sun City", as did Peter Gabriel for the band's performance of his song "Biko". The band's studio recordings of "Mandela Day" and "Biko", as well as another new song "Belfast Child", were released on the Ballad of the Streets EP, which reached No. 1 in the UK Singles Chart (the only time the band did so). "Belfast Child" was a rewrite of the Celtic folk song "She Moved Through the Fair", which had been introduced to Kerr by John Giblin, with new lyrics written about the ongoing conflict in Northern Ireland. The song was also an expression by Simple Minds of their support for the campaign for the release of Beirut-held hostage Brian Keenan, kidnapped by the Islamic Jihad (Keenan was eventually released in 1990).

Their next album, Street Fighting Years, (produced by Trevor Horn and Stephen Lipson) moved away from the American soul and gospel influences of Once Upon a Time in favour of soundtrack atmospherics and a new incorporation of acoustic and folk music-related ingredients. The lyrics were also more directly political, covering topics including the Poll Tax, the Soweto townships, the Berlin Wall and the stationing of nuclear submarines on the Scottish coast. The band underwent further line-up changes during the recording of Street Fighting Years. Mel Gaynor and John Giblin contributed to the initial recordings (and, in Giblin's case, to some of the writing) but both left the band during the sessions. The remaining trio of Kerr, Burchill and MacNeil completed the album with high-profile session musicians playing bass and drums. Gaynor rejoined the band in time for the following tour, though Giblin's departure remained permanent.

"When we first heard the live album I thought, What a great night! What dynamics! But is that it for us – rousing choruses and crashing drums? There didnae seem any room for subtlety, and we always seem at our best when we're not trying to be powerful, but there's an underlying power coming through."

— Jim Kerr reflecting on Simple Minds' change of emphasis in the late 1980s (Q Magazine)

Released in 1989, the album rose to No. 1 in the UK charts and received a rare five-star review from Q magazine. It received a less positive review in Rolling Stone which criticised the band for what the reviewer considered to be political vacuity. "This Is Your Land" was chosen as the lead single for the US, and even with guest vocals from Lou Reed, the single failed to make a mark on the pop charts. Reunited with Mel Gaynor, Simple Minds hired Malcolm Foster (ex-Pretenders) as the new bass player, following a failed attempt to re-recruit Derek Forbes (who declined due to family reasons and a lack of affinity with the new music). The live band was once again expanded by recruiting three additional touring members: Level 42 backing singer Annie McCaig, percussionist Andy Duncan and violinist Lisa Germano. Touring began in May 1989, and included the first and only time that the group headlined Wembley Stadium, where they were supported by fellow Scottish bands The Silencers, Texas and Gun. In September, the concert in the Roman amphitheatre Verona Arena in Italy was recorded for the live video Verona, released by Virgin in 1990, and later included on the Seen the Lights DVD in 2003.

At the end of the Street Fighting Years tour, Simple Minds laid plans to go to Amsterdam to begin recording a new album. Just before the end of the tour, keyboardist Michael MacNeil announced to the band that he would not be joining them as he needed a break. MacNeil played his last concert with Simple Minds in Brisbane a week later. At the time, MacNeil's departure was put down to health concerns, but he had been gradually suffering disillusionment with the band's lifestyle and touring schedule (as well as what Kerr has referred to as "a number of animated quarrels"). At around the same time, long-term manager Bruce Findlay was dismissed. In December 2009, Kerr retrospectively defended the changes in an online diary entry, although he said that MacNeil's departure had been a "colossal fracture". He also paid tribute to his former bandmate and said that MacNeil had been irreplaceable. Simple Minds continued to record, hiring keyboard players as and where required. The first of these was session keyboard player Peter-John Vettese who played live with the band at the Nelson Mandela Freedom Concert and on a short German tour. He was subsequently replaced in the live band by Mark Taylor.

In 1991, Simple Minds returned with Real Life. The album's cover showed a trio of Kerr, Burchill and Gaynor and the writing credits for all songs was Kerr/Burchill. The album reached No. 2 in the UK, where it also spawned four Top 40 singles. In the US, "See the Lights" was the band's last Top 40 pop single. The band toured to support the release, playing as a basic five-piece (Kerr, Burchill, Gaynor, Foster and Taylor) and cutting down on the extended arrangements of the last few large tours. Mel Gaynor left the band in 1992 to pursue session work and other projects, and for the next two years Simple Minds were on hiatus, releasing the compilation album Glittering Prize 81/92 in 1992.

=== Return from hiatus (1994–1999) ===
Simple Minds performing at the Olympia in Paris, France, October 1995

Simple Minds returned to activity later in 1994. By now the band was officially a duo of Kerr and Burchill (with the latter taking on keyboards in the studio, as well as guitar). Hiring Keith Forsey (the writer of "Don't You (Forget About Me)") as producer, they began to put together an album which returned to the uplifting arena rock feel of their Once Upon a Time days. With Gaynor now out of the picture, the remaining instrumentation was covered by session musicians (although Malcolm Foster was included among the bass players used for recording). Good News from the Next World was released in 1995. The album reached No. 2 in the UK and produced the Top 10 hit "She's a River" and the Top 20 single "Hypnotised". The band toured to promote Good News from the Next World, with Malcolm Foster and Mark Taylor as touring bass and keyboard players and Mark Schulman (who had played on the album) on drums. This was Foster's last work with the band, and Schulman returned to session work at the end of the tour.

After being released from their contract with Virgin Records, Simple Minds made use of the skills of their original rhythm section, Derek Forbes and Brian McGee (returning after respective eleven- and fourteen-year absences). Although McGee was not involved beyond the rehearsal stage, Forbes formally rejoined Simple Minds in July 1996. The band then reunited with Mel Gaynor for a studio session in early 1997. Gaynor was reinstated as a full-time member for the European tour (which once again featured Mark Taylor on keyboards). After the tour, album recording sessions were interrupted by Kerr and Burchill's decision to play live (without Forbes, Taylor or Gaynor) as part of the Proms tour (a series of orchestral concerts featuring a mixture of light classical and pop music). The duo played versions of "Alive And Kicking", "Belfast Child" and "Don't You (Forget About Me)" backed by a full orchestra and were billed as Simple Minds.

The new album, Néapolis featured Forbes playing bass guitar on all tracks, and Gaynor on one song, "War Babies". Other drum tracks were recorded by session players Michael Niggs and Jim McDermott, with additional percussion programming by Transglobal Underground/Furniture drummer Hamilton Lee. It was the only Simple Minds album released by Chrysalis Records, who refused to release the album in the US, citing lack of interest. The music video for "Glitterball", the album's lead single, was the first production of any kind to film at the Guggenheim Museum in Bilbao, Spain. A European tour followed between March and July 1998, undermined by problems with ill-health and contractual fiascos (including a pull-out from the Fleadh Festival to be replaced by British rock band James).

As Simple Minds' main writing team, Kerr and Burchill had continued to demo and originate material by themselves. For the latest sessions they had shared studio space with a band called Sly Silver Sly who featured Jim Kerr's brother Mark (previously the drummer with Gun) and bass guitarist Eddie Duffy, and who were working with American songwriter Kevin Hunter. While in the studio, the two writing and recording projects (including the Hunter co-writes) merged to become the sessions for the next Simple Minds album, Our Secrets Are the Same. Once again, Forbes and Gaynor found themselves out of the band: Mark Kerr became the new drummer and Eddie Duffy joined on bass guitar. The new-look Simple Minds made their début with a short set of greatest hits at the Scotland Rocks For Kosovo festival, with Mark Taylor returning on keyboards. The displaced Forbes and Gaynor, having apparently been told that the band was not appearing at the festival, formed a new band of their own to play the same concert.

=== Second hiatus, return and decline (1999–2005) ===
Having delivered Our Secrets Are the Same to Chrysalis, Simple Minds then found themselves caught up in record company politics while Chrysalis, EMI and other companies attempted to merge with each other. Originally due for release in late 1999, the album remained unreleased after the band mired themselves in lawsuits with Chrysalis. In 2000, the situation became even more complicated when Our Secrets Are the Same was leaked on the internet. Discouraged with their label's failure to resolve the problems, and with both momentum and potential album sales lost, the band once again went on hiatus. Eddie Duffy, Mark Taylor and Mark Kerr all moved on to other projects. Jim Kerr moved to Sicily and took up a part-time career as a hotelier.

In 2001, Jim Kerr and Charlie Burchill began working with multi-instrumentalist Gordon Goudie (ex-Primevals) on a new Simple Minds album to be called Cry. Mark Kerr also contributed to the project (this time as an acoustic guitarist and Burchill's co-writer on several songs) while Kerr brought in various Italian musicians as collaborators, including Planet Funk and Punk Investigation. In parallel to Cry, Simple Minds also recorded an album of covers called Neon Lights, featuring Simple Minds versions of songs from artists including Patti Smith, Roxy Music and Kraftwerk. Neon Lights was the first to be completed and released (later in 2001). In the video for the Neon Lights single "Dancing Barefoot", the band consisted of Jim Kerr, Charlie Burchill, Gordon Goudie and Mark Kerr. A 2-CD compilation, The Best of Simple Minds, was released soon afterwards.

Cry was released in April 2002. Although the album did not sell in great numbers in the US, Simple Minds felt confident enough to mount a North American leg of their Floating World tour (named after the instrumental track which closes Cry), their first in seven years. With Goudie opting to remain studio bound (and Mark Kerr leaving the band again), Simple Minds once again recruited Mel Gaynor as drummer. The live band was completed by the returning Eddie Duffy on bass guitar and by new keyboard player/programmer Andy Gillespie (of SoundControl). On 28 October 2003, Capitol released Seen The Lights – A Visual History, the first-ever Simple Minds commercial (double) DVD, featuring over four hours and twenty minutes of archive footage. The first disc includes the majority of the band's promotional videos. The second disc is devoted to Verona, the band's first live home video release, which was originally released in VHS format in 1990. It was upmixed to 5.1 surround sound for the DVD, but otherwise remains the same as the original VHS copy.

On 18 October 2004, Simple Minds released a five-CD box set compilation entitled Silver Box. This mostly comprised previously unreleased demos, radio and TV sessions and live recordings from 1979 to 1995, but also included the long-delayed Our Secrets Are the Same. In July 2005, the band embarked on the Intimate tour, a series of low-key European and UK gigs at smaller venues which ended in December 2005. Andy Gillespie was unable to appear at all the gigs, and Mark Taylor returned to cover for him on several occasions. From this point onwards, the two alternated as Simple Minds' live keyboard player, depending on Gillespie's schedule with his other projects.

=== Return to prominence (2005–2009) ===
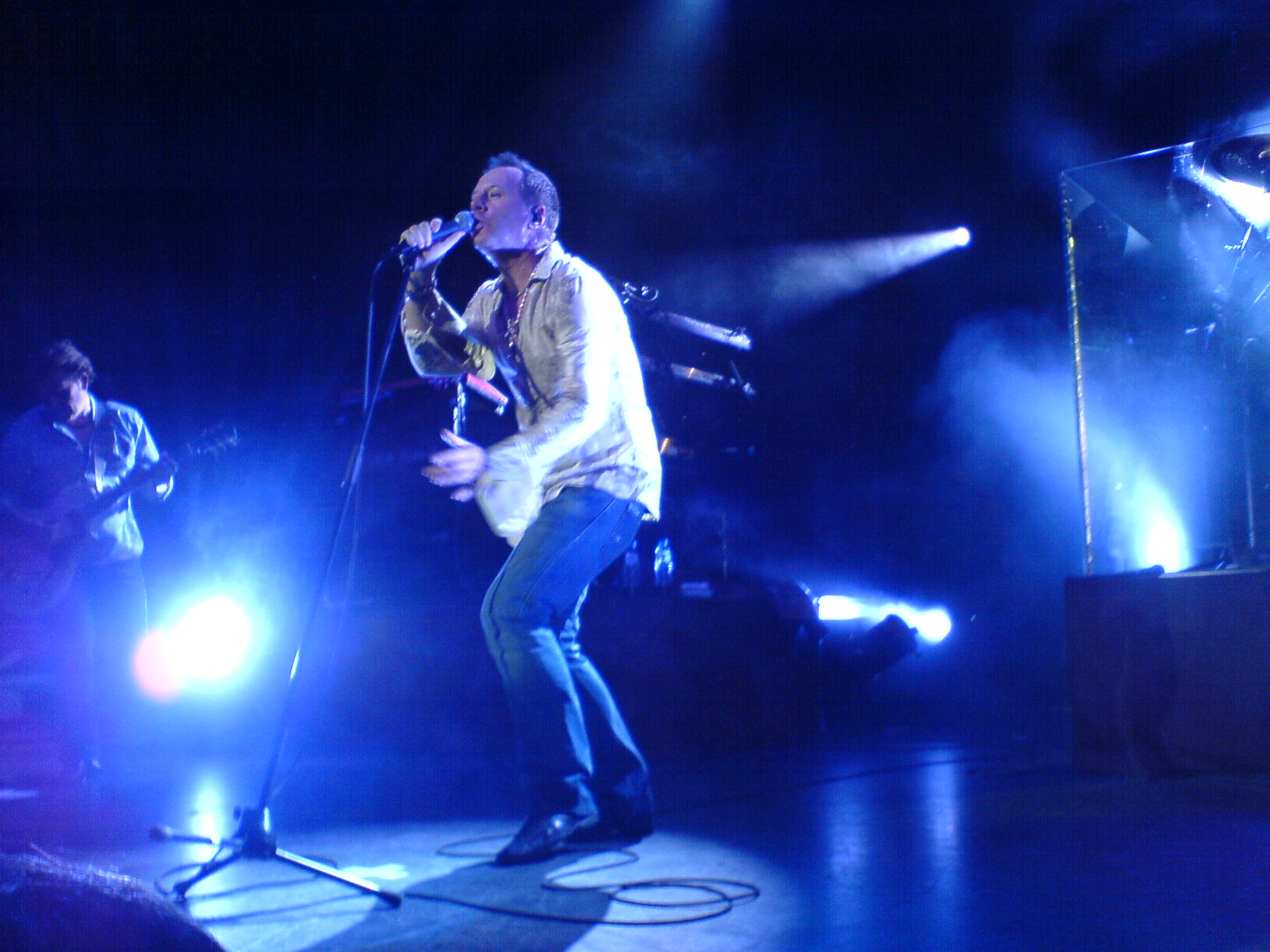
Frontman Jim Kerr performing with Simple Minds, 2006

With the Kerr, Burchill, Duffy and Gaynor line-up, Simple Minds released Black & White 050505 (their fourteenth studio album), on 12 September 2005. The album's first single, "Home", received airplay on alternative rock radio stations in the US. It reached No. 37 in the UK and was not released in North America. The band spent 2006 touring throughout Europe, the Far East, Australia and New Zealand on the Black And White tour (with Mark Taylor on keyboards). 2007 marked the band's 30th anniversary and saw the band embark on a brief tour of Australia and New Zealand as guests of INXS. On 27 June 2008, Simple Minds played the 90th birthday tribute to Nelson Mandela in London's Hyde Park. The band then undertook a short tour of the UK to celebrate their 30th anniversary. During these concerts, the band performed the entire New Gold Dream (81–82–83–84) album and songs from their other albums in a two-part concert performance. Jim Kerr and Charlie Burchill also played a number of concerts with Night of the Proms across Europe in spring, followed by further shows in late 2008.

In June 2008, Kerr and Burchill briefly reunited with the full original band line-up for the first time in twenty-seven years, when meetings with Derek Forbes, Mick MacNeil and Brian McGee led to a studio rehearsal date. Reverting to the Kerr/Burchill/Duffy/Gaynor line-up, Simple Minds released a new studio album entitled Graffiti Soul on 25 May 2009. On the November/December Graffiti Soul UK tour they were supported by Orchestral Manoeuvres in the Dark as special guests. In May 2009, Graffiti Soul's first single, "Rockets", was released as a digital download single only. On 31 May 2009, the album entered the UK Album chart at No. 10, becoming Simple Minds' first album in 14 years to enter the UK Top 10. Interspersed with Simple Minds activity, Jim Kerr recorded and released his first solo album Lostboy! AKA Jim Kerr on 17 May 2010 under the name "Lostboy! AKA". Explaining the project name and ethos, he commented "I didn't want to start a new band. I like my band...and I didn't want a point blank Jim Kerr solo album either." A Lostboy! AKA 10-date European tour followed from 18 to 31 May 2010.

=== Touring (2010–2014) ===
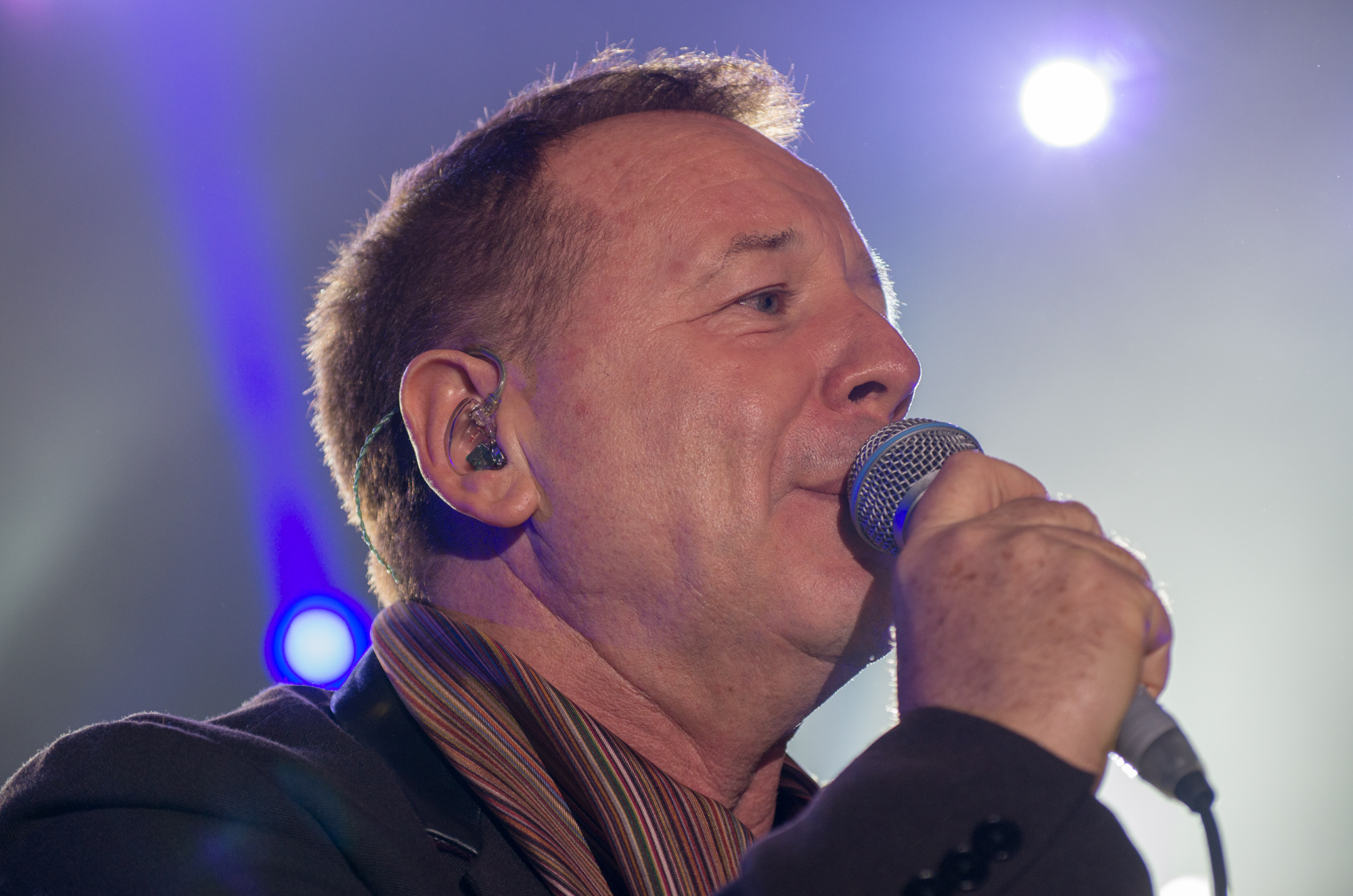
Lead singer Jim Kerr performing in 2014

The band played a mini-concert on 2 October 2010 at the Cash For Kids Ball organised by Radio Clyde at the Hilton in Glasgow, and a full-length concert on 10 December 2010 at the Festhalle in Bern. In early October 2010, a new line-up of Simple Minds – Burchill, Kerr, Gaynor, Gillespie with new bassist Ged Grimes (ex-Danny Wilson and Deacon Blue) – completed four weeks at the Sphere Recording Studios in London during which four songs were recorded and mixed for a new compilation album to be called Greatest Hits + and for the new Simple Minds studio album. From 16 June to 28 August 2011, the Greatest Hits + tour visited European countries: the UK, Belgium, Germany, France, Italy, Switzerland, Ireland, Gibraltar and Serbia mainly at summer festival venues.

Simple Minds played several free concerts (on 4 July 2011 in Potsdam, Germany, on 4 July 2011 in Florence, Italy for the opening of Florence's Hard Rock Cafe, on 18 August in Belgrade, Serbia before 110,000 people and on 27 August in Bad Harzburg, Germany before 25,000 people). To coincide with the 2012 5X5 Live European tour, EMI Music released on 20 February 2012 the X5 box set featuring the first five albums over six discs: Life in a Day, Real to Real Cacophony, Empires and Dance, Sons and Fascination/Sister Feelings Call and New Gold Dream (81–82–83–84) (with Sons and Fascination and Sister Feelings Call as separate discs in a gatefold sleeve as well as bonus material on each disc, including B-sides and remixes). After a gig on 30 March 2012 at the Døgnvill Festival in Tromsø, Norway, the band embarked on 23 June 2012 in Vienna, on a 25-date tour of European summer festivals which ended on 22 September 2012 in Germersheim, Germany. In July they played at the T in the Park festival.

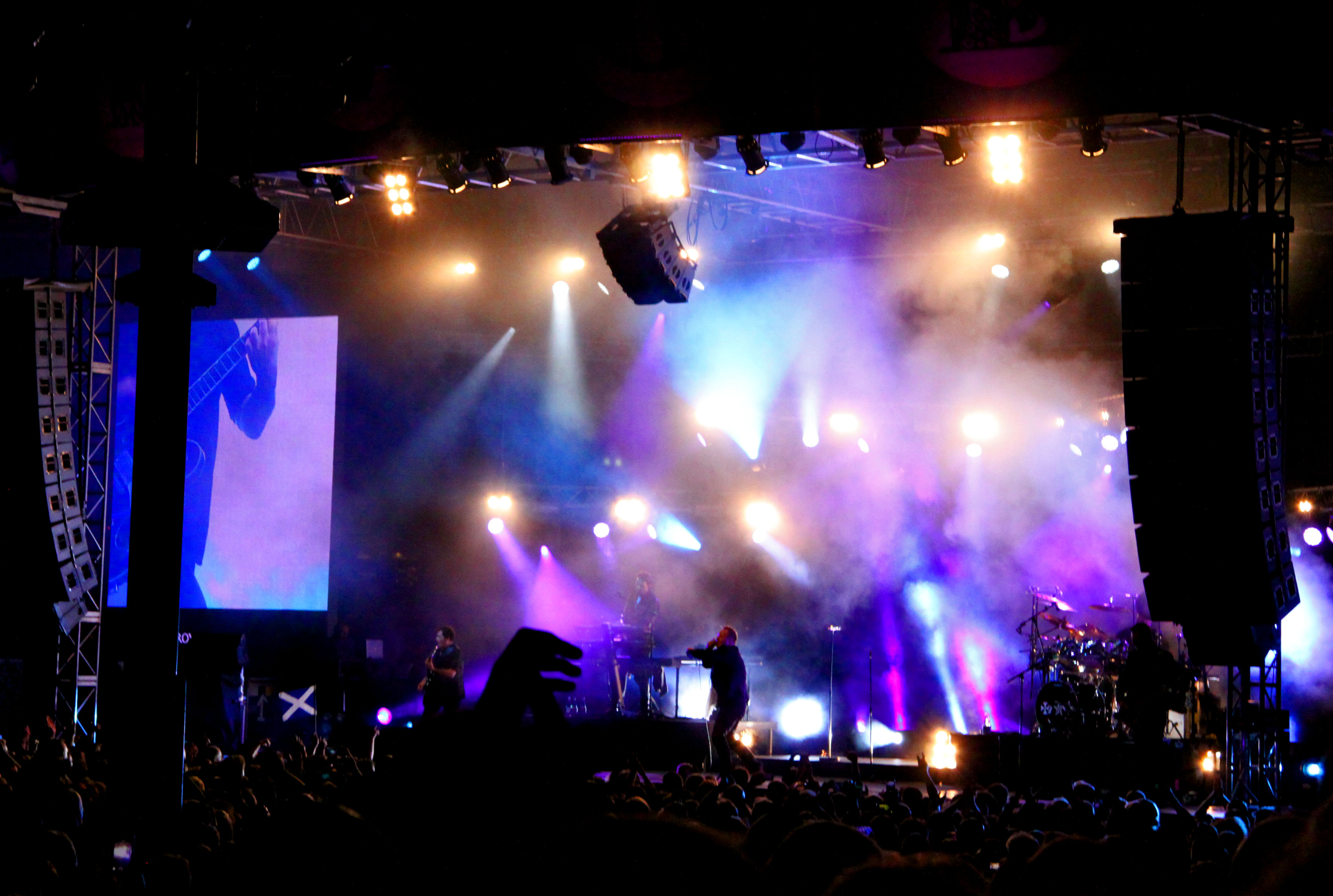
Simple Minds performing in Copenhagen, 2014

On 21 April Virgin Records released the band's first record ever to be released exclusively for Record Store Day 2012. The 12" single contained two remixes, "Theme For Great Cities" remixed by Moby on side A and the 2012 remix of "I Travel" remixed by John Leckie (who produced the original version of the song in 1980) on side B. The 12" was limited to 1,000 copies worldwide, of which 100 copies were sold in Sister Ray Records in London, where Jim Kerr and Charlie Burchill took part in a record-signing session. EMI released on 19 November 2012 a double live album of the tour entitled 5X5 Live. Simple Minds embarked in late 2012 on an eight-date Australia and New Zealand joint tour with American band Devo and Australian band The Church starting on 29 November 2012 in Melbourne, and ending on 15 December 2012 in Auckland (the only show played in New Zealand).

On 25 March 2013 a new greatest-hits two- and three-disc collection entitled Celebrate: The Greatest Hits + was released on Virgin Records, including two new tracks, "Blood Diamonds" "Broken Glass Park"; the three-disc version also includes "Stagefright", a track which has never been available in CD format before, and unreleased single mixes of "Jeweller to the Stars" and "Space". The North American version of the album contains only one disc. It was followed by a 30-date Greatest Hits + UK tour, which began with a concert in Dublin on 25 March and ended in Ipswich on 4 May 2013.

In October 2013 they continued the Greatest Hits + tour in Brazil, United States and Canada, followed by concerts in South Africa, Europe and the UK in November, including four arena shows in Glasgow, Manchester, Birmingham and London, with guests Ultravox at all four concerts.

=== Big Music and Acoustic (2014–2017) ===
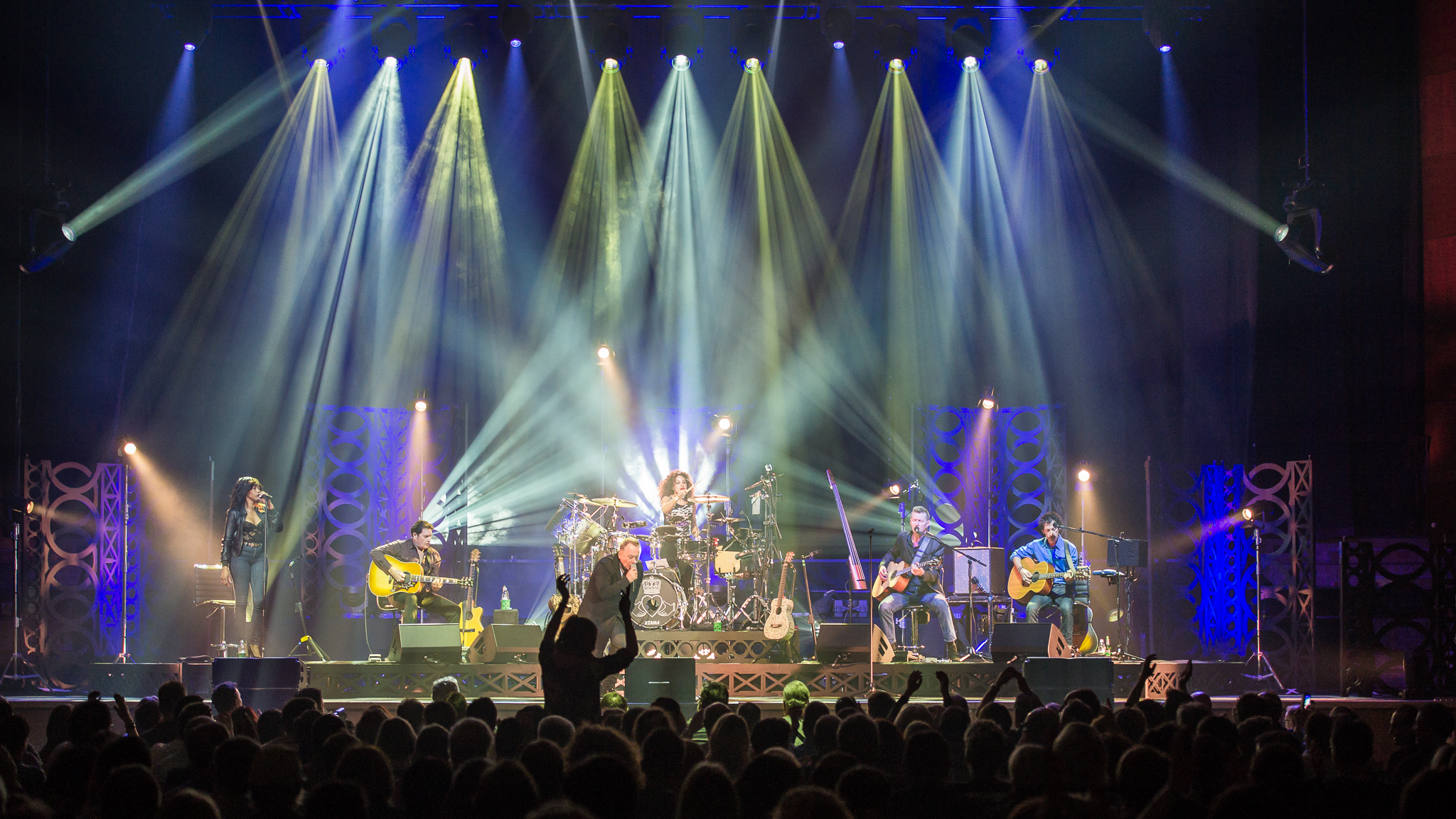
Simple Minds – Acoustic Live Tour 2017 in Nuremberg, Germany

In November 2014 Simple Minds released their first studio album in five years entitled Big Music, which was followed by a Winter/Spring 2015 UK and European tour (from February to May 2015). On 22 October 2014, Simple Minds were presented the Q Inspiration to Music award by Manic Street Preachers frontman James Dean Bradfield and saw the first public outing of new member Catherine AD as part of the line-up. On 2 November 2014, Simple Minds introduced Big Music with a special acoustic session for Radio Clyde's The Billy Sloan Collection.

In December 2014, Simple Minds recorded an acoustic session at Absolute Radio including live unplugged performances of "Honest Town", "Alive & Kicking", "Let The Day Begin", "Don't You (Forget about Me)" and David Bowie cover "The Man Who Sold the World". The band continued to tour throughout 2015. On 14 November 2015, the band self-released a 29-track double-CD live album entitled Live – Big Music Tour 2015. It was recorded during the 2015 Big Music live tour and contained a cross-section of the Simple Minds back catalogue.

On 7 April 2016, Simple Minds performed their first unplugged gig at the Zermatt Unplugged Festival in Zermatt, Switzerland, followed by a second unplugged show in Zürich on 29 October 2016, also at the Zermatt Unplugged Festival. This was the first concert to feature a secondary acoustic live-and-recording line-up of Simple Minds, with Jim Kerr and Sarah Brown on vocals, Charlie Burchill on acoustic guitar and accordion, Ged Grimes on bass, Gordy Goudie returning on acoustic guitar and harmonica and new recruit Cherisse Osei on percussion. In May 2016, they were given an Ivor Novello award where Kerr noted that: "we just wanted to be in a great band and take it round the world. We're very fortunate because we get recognition".

In October 2016, the band embarked on a promotional tour of the acoustic material, including a live concert on 10 November 2016 at the Hackney Empire, London that was broadcast on BBC Radio 2. Simple Minds released Acoustic which was recorded with the new line-up during Summer 2016 and which featured acoustic re-recordings of songs spanning their career. On the lead single, 1982's "Promised You A Miracle", the band were joined by fellow Scot KT Tunstall. The two-disc vinyl version of the album was released on 25 November 2016, including three extra tracks: "Stand By Love", "Speed Your Love To Me" and "Light Travels". In Spring 2017 they embarked on a two-month (47-date) Acoustic Live '17 UK & European tour.

On 16 November 2016, Simple Minds were given the Forth Best Performance Award at the Radio Forth awards ceremony in Edinburgh.

=== Walk Between Worlds and line-up changes (2017–2022) ===
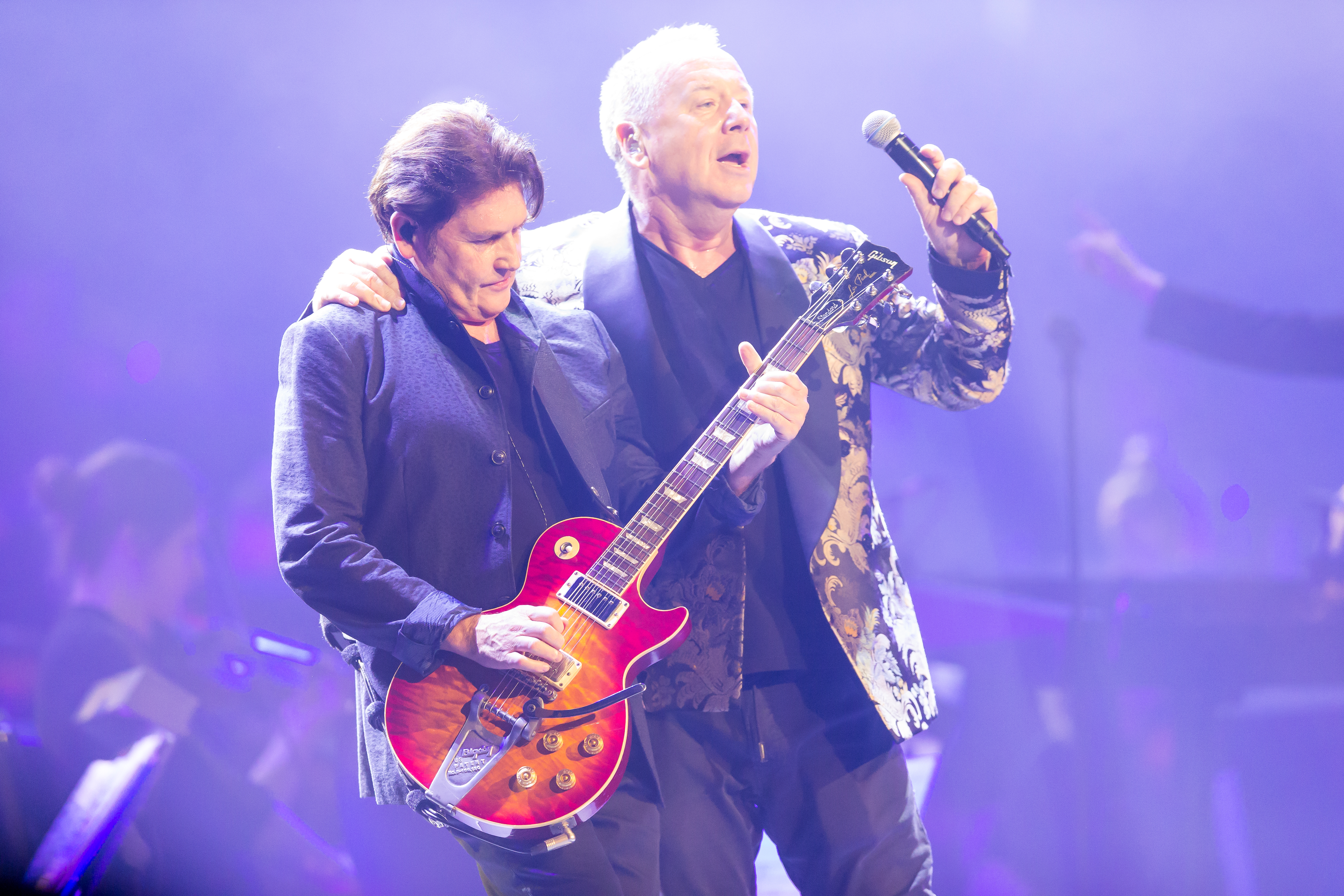
Performing live at Night of the Proms, Germany

Since September 2014, Simple Minds had been working on new material with the electric Kerr/Burchill/Grimes/Gaynor line-up (minus Andy Gillespie), including the songs "Fireball" (Note: About working on the next album, Jim Kerr said in January 2015 during The Real McCoy radio show: "There's this song I'm very excited about – that you introduced to me, a guy called Steve Eddie, a song called "Fireball" – God, I've had that for seven or eight years and I played that this last month and I just know that its time has come.") and "A Silent Kiss". (Note: About working on the next album, Jim Kerr said on 4 January 2016: "Back to work: Began yesterday and it's all good! Working on a Charlie Burchill tune called "A Silent Kiss". Kind of dark, very romantic, related in style to both "Liaison" and "Bittersweet" from Big Music. Some songs you seemingly have to dig very deep to create. Others seem like they just want to jump out of you – somehow already fully formed. Some come easy, some more elusive. This one feels great already.")

On 15 November 2017, the new album title and track listing leaked on Amazon UK. Entitled Walk Between Worlds, the album features eight tracks while the Deluxe edition includes three bonus tracks (one live and two studio tracks). On 20 November 2017, a 20-second promo video was released on the band's Facebook page, promoting the album. The video featured a snippet of "Magic", the lead single, as performed by the six-person Acoustic line-up (now including Catherine AD). Produced by Simple Minds, Wright and Goldberg, Walk Between Worlds was released on 2 February 2018 via BMG and entered at No. 4 – their highest UK album chart position in over 23 years – and No. 2 on the Scottish albums charts, the album's highest chart position in all.

After being an on/off member of Simple Minds for 35 years, Mel Gaynor left the band for the final time in 2017. In Spring and Summer 2018, the band extensively toured Europe as part of the Walk Between Worlds tour, promoting the new album. Having performed on three tracks on the album, Cherisse Osei now became the band's full-time drummer, replacing Gaynor; Catherine AD also joined the live band on additional guitar, vocals and keyboards. The band notably performed Walk Between Worlds in its entirety during the eight Spring concerts that occurred from 13 February at the Barrowland Ballroom, Glasgow, UK to 22 February 2018 in Berlin, Germany. After a unique show in Mexico City on 20 September 2018, the band extensively toured North America (now minus Catherine AD) from 24 September in Bethlehem, Pennsylvania up to 11 November 2018 in Orlando, Florida as part of the Walk Between Worlds tour.

In 2019, Simple Minds released Live in the City of Angels, a snapshot from the band's 2018 North American tour, their biggest ever to date. The live album was made available on multiple formats; the standard CD and vinyl versions feature 25 songs, mostly recorded on 24 October 2018 at the Orpheum Theatre, whereas the Deluxe CD and digital formats contain an additional 15 tracks recorded during sound checks and rehearsals, yielding a 40-song collection to mark the band's 40-year career. The same year, the band also released a new compilation album entitled 40: The Best Of 1979–2019, a retrospective of the band's 40-year long recording career. It includes as a new track the band's cover of "For One Night Only" by King Creosote. The first Europe and UK (Winter–Spring) leg of the 40 Years Of Hits world tour 2020 began on 28 February 2020 in Stavanger, Norway but was interrupted with the cancellation of the show due to take place on 11 March 2020 in Herning, Denmark and the cancellation of the rest of the tour due to the COVID-19 pandemic.

=== Rescheduled world tour and Direction of the Heart (2022–2025) ===
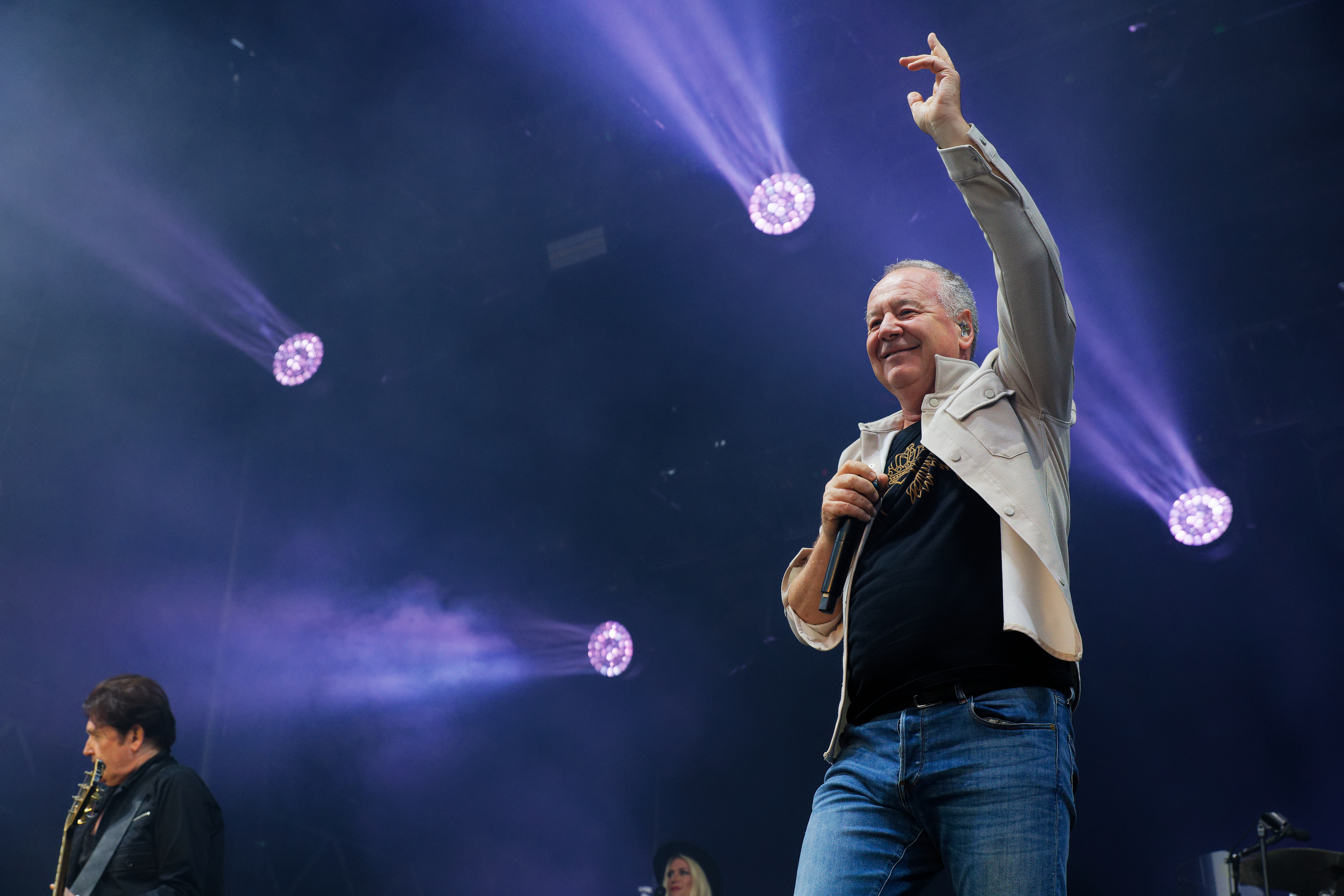
Lead singer Jim Kerr performing with the band, 2022

The cancelled world tour was rescheduled to 2022 with over 80 dates across more than 20 countries in spring/summer 2022. On 17 January 2022, Simple Minds released the single "Act of Love" to mark the anniversary of the band's first performance on 17 January 1978 at Glasgow's Satellite City. In a statement from the band, the track had ended up shelved in the process of recording Simple Minds' debut album, though it had a lasting life during various live performances. Kerr and other band members still enjoyed the demo recording so much that they vowed to officially release an alternate version eventually.

On 21 October 2022, the band released their studio album Direction of the Heart via BMG. The very same day, they released the lead single "Vision Thing" for free. COVID-19 quarantine restrictions prevented Jim Kerr and Charlie Burchill, who both resided in Sicily, from travelling to the UK, so the new album had been recorded in Hamburg, with most tracks written, created and demoed in Sicily. On 9 July 2022, Simple Minds released a lyric video for "Vision Thing" on YouTube. A fourth single from the album, "Solstice Kiss", released in October 2023, became a hit in the UK, reaching No. 2 on the UK Vinyl Singles Chart and entering the Top 40 on the UK Singles Sales Chart for one week at No. 31. Former member John Giblin died on 14 May 2023.

On 27 October 2023, Simple Minds released the live album New Gold Dream – Live From Paisley Abbey, a recording of the one-off performance of their 1982 album New Gold Dream (81–82–83–84) for Sky TV's Greatest Albums Live series, held at Paisley Abbey. On 29 December 2023, Charlie Burchill announced that Erik Ljunggren would be joining the group on keyboards for the band's 2024 tour. On 10 December 2024, Simple Minds released a brand new single entitled "Your Name in Lights" also featured on the soundtrack of the career-spanning documentary Simple Minds: Everything is Possible, directed by Joss Crowley, also available the same day to stream and download on BBC iPlayer. On 21 February 2025, Simple Minds announced the upcoming release on 25 April 2025 on multiple formats (Note: 24-track 2CD media book with 24 pages of exclusive photos and tour notes written by Jim Kerr, 18-track double black vinyl in a gatefold sleeve, exclusive 18-track double clear/glitter vinyl in a gatefold sleeve, digital download and streaming.) of Live in The City of Diamonds, a new live album recorded at a sold out Amsterdam's Ziggo Dome on 6 April 2024 (Note: ... to an audience of 17.000 people.) that completes the triptych of the "Live in The City" series dating back to 1987. (Note: ... the other two being Live in the City of Light (1987) and Live in the City of Angels (2019).)

=== Upcoming twentieth studio album Sacrosanct and V Tour (2026–present) ===
On 24 April 2026, Jim Kerr announced that Simple Minds were then on the verge of completing their next studio album. On 17 May 2026, Simple Minds confirmed that on this day, they'd just finished recording their twentieth studio album.

In early June 2026, Simple Minds announced that they will embark on a new 8-date Australia and New Zealand tour entitled "V Tour 2027" (subtitled "Celebrating 5 decades of music") from 13 February to 1 March 2027. They are expected to visit Perth, Adelaide, Melbourne, Sydney, Brisbane, Auckland, Wellington and Christchurch.

On 3 September 2026, the band announced that their upcoming twentieth studio album, Sacrosanct, would be released on 29 January 2027. It will feature eight new songs, including "Beginner Boys", the album's first single, which premiered the same day as the album announcement. On 18 September 2026, 'Beginner Boys' was announced as BBC Radio 2's "Record Of The Week".

Prior to undertaking their worldwide V Tour in 2027, Simple Minds headlined Radio 2 in the Park 2026 on 13 September 2026, their only UK show of the year.

On 6 November 2026, it was announced the upcoming release on Friday 13 November 2026 of "Elysium", the second single from Sacrosanct.

== Musical style and influences ==
Simple Minds' name was derived from a lyric in the David Bowie song "The Jean Genie". Early influences on the band included Bowie, Mott the Hoople, the Velvet Underground, Roxy Music, Brian Eno, Magazine, Kraftwerk and Neu!. As teenagers, Kerr and Burchill also listened to Yes, Genesis, the Stooges, Stevie Wonder, Hawkwind, and Van der Graaf Generator. Recordings such as Donna Summer's "I Feel Love" (1977), OMD's "Electricity" (1979), and Joy Division's Unknown Pleasures (1979) had an influence on the band. While touring the UK in 1980, Simple Minds developed relationships with peers like OMD, Echo & the Bunnymen and the Teardrop Explodes, and began "swapping notes" with those bands.

Early in their career, Simple Minds' musical genres ranged from post-punk, new wave, art rock, and synth-pop. The Guardian described their third album Empires and Dance (1980) as a "Mitteleuropean psychodrama", whilst Kerr described the album as a "travelogue with spiky dance music". By the release of their fourth album New Gold Dream (81/82/83/84) in 1982, their musical style had switched to new pop, whilst still incorporating styles of new wave, art pop, and synth-pop. During Simple Minds' early-to-mid-1980s period, Burchill's guitar had a distinctive and atmospheric sound. Making heavy use of effects such as delay and chorus, his playing often provided subtle textures behind the band's more drum- and bass-propelled songs. This style was most apparent on New Gold Dream (81/82/83/84). From 1983's album Sparkle in the Rain onwards the group evolved a different style, bringing Burchill's playing more into the foreground. With their 1985 album Once Upon a Time, the band were being described as "grand, expansive arena-rock".

== Legacy ==
The Simple Minds album New Gold Dream (81/82/83/84) was an influence on U2 during the making of The Unforgettable Fire (1984). They were an influence on the Welsh rock band Manic Street Preachers, including on their album Futurology (2014). James Dean Bradfield cited Empires and Dance as a "massive influence" on his music, saying that the album was "like learning a new language; it's a nuclear reactor of musical orchestration from five working-class Glasgow boys". Nicky Wire said, "They made five stupendous albums, up to Sparkle in the Rain. So futuristic, and coming from these working-class kids [...] And Derek Forbes is one of the greatest bass players ever." Additionally, the band have been said to have played an influence on fellow Scottish rock band Primal Scream. Despite this, Roy Wilkinson of Mojo stated that the band "aren't often admitted to the musical canon of cool".

== Awards and nominations ==
Year	Awards	Work	Category	Result	Ref.
1985	MTV Video Music Awards	"Don't You (Forget About Me)"	Best Art Direction	Nominated	
1985	MTV Video Music Awards	"Don't You (Forget About Me)"	Best Direction	Nominated	
1986	American Music Awards	Themselves	Favorite Pop/Rock Video Band/Duo/Group	Nominated	
1986	Brit Awards	Themselves	Best British Group	Nominated	
1986	Pollstar Concert Industry Awards	Themselves	Next Major Arena Headliner	Nominated	
1986	Smash Hits Poll Winners Party	Themselves	Best Group	Nominated	
1986	ASCAP Pop Music Awards	"Don't You (Forget About Me)"	Most Performed Songs	Won	
1987	ASCAP Pop Music Awards	"Alive and Kicking"	Most Performed Songs	Won	
1989	Music & Media Year-End Awards	Themselves	Group of the Year	2nd place	
1990	Brit Awards	"Belfast Child"	Best British Single	Nominated	
1991	Q Awards	Themselves	Best Live Act	Won	
2014	Q Awards	Themselves	Q Inspiration Award	Won	
2016	Ivor Novello Award	Themselves	Outstanding Song Collection	Won	
2018	Best Art Vinyl	Walk Between Worlds	Best Art Vinyl	Nominated	
2019	Classic Pop Readers' Awards	Themselves	Group of the Year	Nominated	
2019	Classic Pop Readers' Awards	Themselves	Live Act of the Year	Nominated	

== Personnel ==
=== Current members ===
- Jim Kerr (1977–present) – lead vocals
- Charlie Burchill (1977–present) – guitar, keyboards, backing vocals

=== Current session musicians ===
- Gordy Goudie (2001–present) – guitar, keyboards, backing vocals
- Sarah Brown (2009–present) – backing vocals
- Ged Grimes (2010–present) – bass, backing vocals
- Cherisse Osei (2017–present) – drums
- Erik Ljunggren (2023–present) – keyboards

=== Former members ===
- Brian McGee (1977–1981) – drums, backing vocals
- Tony Donald (1977–1978) – bass
- Duncan Barnwell (1978) – rhythm guitar
- Mick MacNeil (1978–1990) – keyboards, backing vocals
- Derek Forbes (1978–1985; 1996–1998) – bass, backing vocals
- Kenny Hyslop (1981–1982) – drums
- Mike Ogletree (1982) – drums
- Mel Gaynor (1982–1988; 1989–1991; 1997–1998; 2002–2017) – drums, backing vocals
- John Giblin (1985–1988) – bass

=== Line-ups ===
December 1977–January 1978	January–February 1978	February–April 1978	April–November 1978
Jim Kerr – vocals; Charlie Burchill – guitar; Brian McGee – drums; Tony Donald – bass	Jim Kerr – vocals; Charlie Burchill – guitar; Brian McGee – drums; Tony Donald – bass; Duncan Barnwell – guitar	Jim Kerr – vocals; Charlie Burchill – guitar; Brian McGee – drums; Tony Donald – bass; Duncan Barnwell – guitar; Mick MacNeil – keyboards	Jim Kerr – vocals; Charlie Burchill – guitar; Brian McGee – drums; Duncan Barnwell – guitar; Mick MacNeil – keyboards; Derek Forbes – bass
November 1978–August 1981	August 1981–February 1982	February–November 1982	November 1982–April 1985
Jim Kerr – vocals; Charlie Burchill – guitar; Brian McGee – drums; Mick MacNeil – keyboards; Derek Forbes – bass	Jim Kerr – vocals; Charlie Burchill – guitar; Mick MacNeil – keyboards; Derek Forbes – bass; Kenny Hyslop – drums	Jim Kerr – vocals; Charlie Burchill – guitar; Mick MacNeil – keyboards; Derek Forbes – bass; Mike Ogletree – drums	Jim Kerr – vocals; Charlie Burchill – guitar; Mick MacNeil – keyboards; Derek Forbes – bass; Mel Gaynor – drums
April 1985–July 1988	July 1988–May 1989	May 1989–January 1990	January 1990–October 1991
Jim Kerr – vocals; Charlie Burchill – guitar; Mick MacNeil – keyboards; Mel Gaynor – drums; John Giblin – bass	Jim Kerr – vocals; Charlie Burchill – guitar; Mick MacNeil – keyboards	Jim Kerr – vocals; Charlie Burchill – guitar; Mick MacNeil – keyboards; Mel Gaynor – drums	Jim Kerr – vocals; Charlie Burchill – guitar; Mel Gaynor – drums
October 1991–July 1996	July 1996–March 1997	March 1997–August 1998	August 1998–January 2002
Jim Kerr – vocals; Charlie Burchill – guitar	Jim Kerr – vocals; Charlie Burchill – guitar; Derek Forbes – bass	Jim Kerr – vocals; Charlie Burchill – guitar; Derek Forbes – bass; Mel Gaynor – drums	Jim Kerr – vocals; Charlie Burchill – guitar
January 2002–April 2017	April 2017–present		
Jim Kerr – vocals; Charlie Burchill – guitar; Mel Gaynor – drums	Jim Kerr – vocals; Charlie Burchill – guitar		

== Discography ==
- Life in a Day (1979)
- Real to Real Cacophony (1979)
- Empires and Dance (1980)
- Sons and Fascination/Sister Feelings Call (1981)
- New Gold Dream (81/82/83/84) (1982)
- Sparkle in the Rain (1984)
- Once Upon a Time (1985)
- Street Fighting Years (1989)
- Real Life (1991)
- Good News from the Next World (1995)
- Néapolis (1998)
- Our Secrets Are the Same (2000) (Note: Not officially released until 2004.)
- Neon Lights (2001)
- Cry (2002)
- Black & White 050505 (2005)
- Graffiti Soul (2009)
- Big Music (2014)
- Acoustic (2016)
- Walk Between Worlds (2018)
- Direction of the Heart (2022)
- Sacrosanct (2027)
