= Charlie Burchill =

Scottish musician and composer (born 1959)

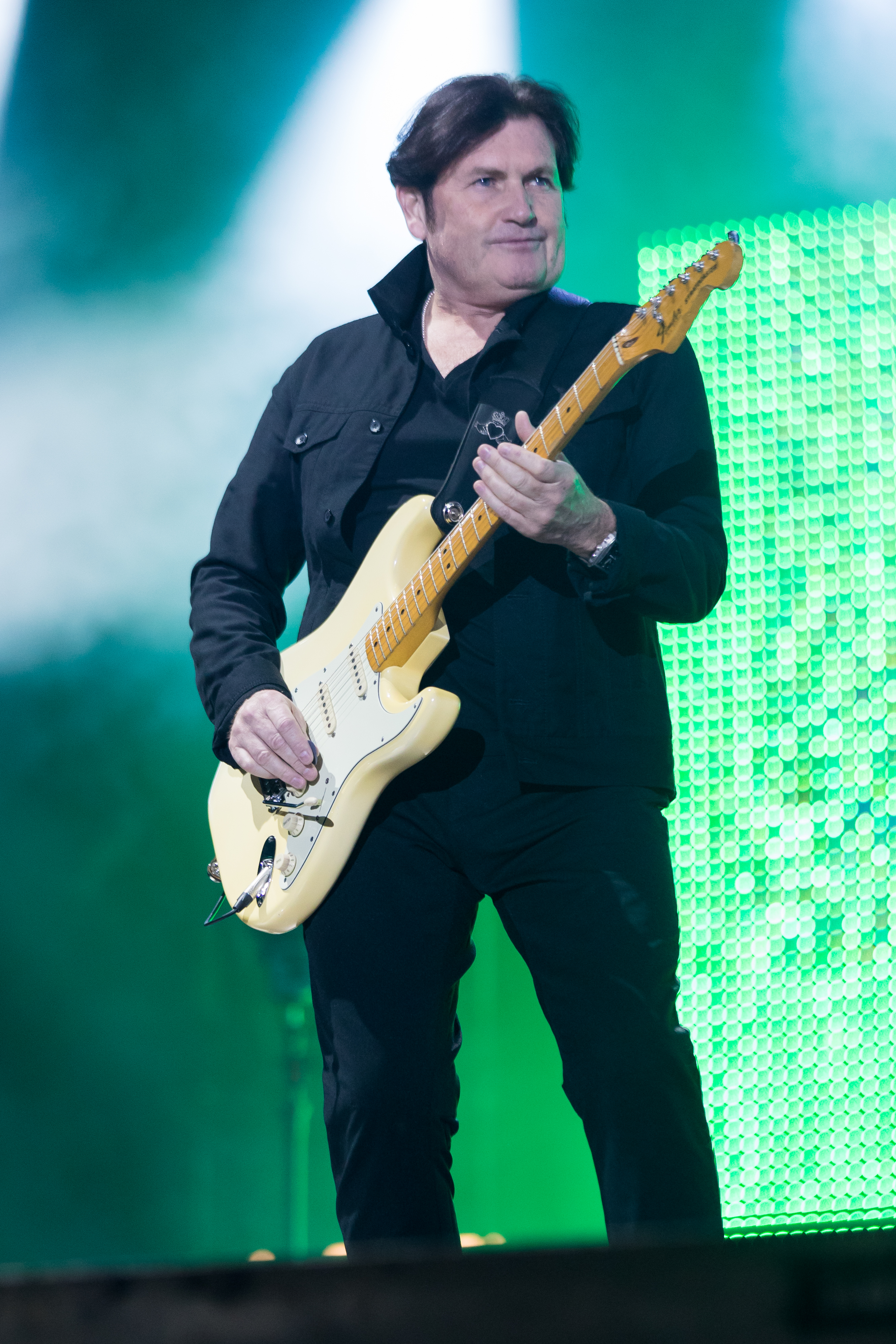
- Burchill performing in 2018

Background information
- Born: Charles Burchill; 27 November 1959 (age 66)
- Origin: Glasgow, Scotland
- Genres: Rock; post-punk; new wave; pop rock; alternative rock
- Occupations: Musician, songwriter
- Instruments: Guitar; keyboard; violin; mandolin; saxophone; percussion; vocals
- Years active: 1977–present
- Member of: Simple Minds

Charles Burchill (born 27 November 1959) is a Scottish musician and composer who is the guitarist for the rock band Simple Minds. He is recognized for his enduring partnership with lead singer Jim Kerr, with whom he has played since their school days. The two remain the only original members still performing with the group. Burchill is primarily known as a guitarist, but he is a multi-instrumentalist who also plays keyboards, saxophone, and violin.

His musical career began at the age of seven, and by his teenage years, he had formed the punk band Johnny & The Self-Abusers with Kerr in 1977. After that group disbanded, they formed Simple Minds, achieving global success in the 1980s with hits such as "Don't You (Forget About Me)," "Alive and Kicking," and "Promised You a Miracle". Burchill's guitar style is characterized by the extensive use of effects like delay and chorus, which helped define the band's atmospheric "sonic cathedral" sound.

Beyond his technical role as a guitarist, Burchill is a core songwriter for the band. While he often composes on the guitar, he has noted that for decades his primary instrument for writing has been the piano. He is known for a collaborative approach to composition, historically working closely with former keyboardist Mick MacNeil to create intricate musical arrangements where neither instrument dominates. In October 2025, Burchill and Kerr published a joint memoir titled Our Secrets Are The Same.

== Early life ==
Burchill was born and raised in the housing scheme on the south side of Glasgow. His musical interest began early; at age nine, his mother bought him his first acoustic guitar using coupons from Embassy cigarette packets. He began playing seriously around age 12, eventually taking over a higher-quality guitar from his older brother. At age eight, he met Jim Kerr in their neighborhood, beginning a lifelong creative partnership. During their teenage years, they spent nights in Burchill’s bedroom writing songs and listening to records by David Bowie, Roxy Music, and The Doors.

== Simple Minds ==
=== Establishment ===
In early 1977, Burchill and Kerr joined the Glasgow punk band Johnny & The Self-Abusers. Burchill played guitar and violin in the band under the name "Charlie Argue". They recruited school friends Brian McGee and Tony Donald, with whom they had played in a previous band called Biba-Rom!. Despite being part of the punk scene, Burchill noted that the band's influences were more art-rock and psychedelic.

Johnny & The Self-Abusers released one single, "Saints and Sinners," on November 17, 1977. The band broke up the same day due to creative differences. Immediately after the split, Burchill and Kerr formed Simple Minds, taking their name from a lyric in David Bowie's "The Jean Genie". Simple Minds played their first show on January 17, 1978, at Satellite City in Glasgow. Burchill primarily composes the music and melodies. He often initiates the process by creating musical pieces on a piano or keyboard and sending them to Kerr.

=== Breakthrough ===
Initially signed to Arista Records, Simple Minds released their debut album Life in a Day in 1979 to moderate commercial success, while the following two albums, Real to Real Cacophony (1979) and Empires and Dance (1980), achieved critical praise but limited sales. After signing to Virgin Records, their fourth album, Sons and Fascination/Sister Feelings Call (1981), became their first top twenty album in the UK, beginning their rise in mainstream popularity. The following album, New Gold Dream (81/82/83/84) (1982), proved their major breakthrough, reaching the top ten in the UK, Australia, New Zealand, and Sweden, as well being their first charting album on the Billboard 200 in the US. The album also produced three UK top forty singles in "Promised You a Miracle", "Glittering Prize", and "Someone Somewhere in Summertime".

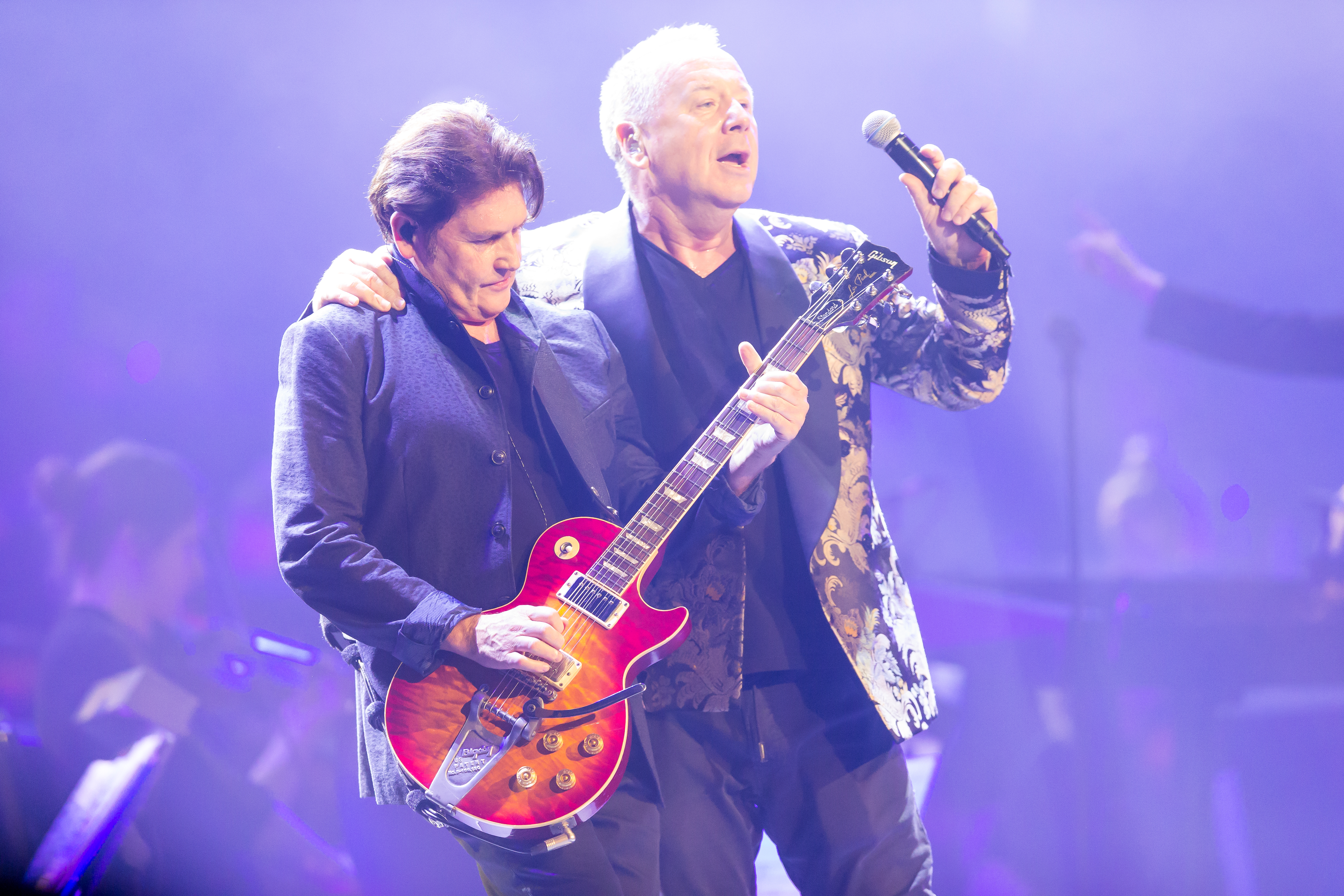
Burchill and Jim Kerr performing with Simple Minds at Night of the Proms, Germany (2016)

Their next album, Sparkle in the Rain (1984), featured another hit single with "Waterfront" and continued the band's commercial prominence, debuting at number one in both the UK, where it was certified Platinum, and New Zealand. "Don't You (Forget About Me)", their contribution to the soundtrack of the 1985 film The Breakfast Club, became their breakthrough hit in the US, reaching number one on the Billboard Hot 100. The following album, Once Upon a Time (1985), reached number one in the UK and the Netherlands, the top three in Canada and New Zealand, and the top ten in the US. It was certified 3× Platinum in the UK and Gold in the US, and spawned four more hit singles with "Alive and Kicking", "Sanctify Yourself", "All the Things She Said" and "Ghostdancing". Their chart dominance continued with the album Street Fighting Years (1989), with its lead single "Belfast Child" reaching number one in the UK, Ireland and the Netherlands. After two more successful albums with Real Life (1991) and Good News from the Next World (1995), the band underwent a commercial decline in the late 1990s. They returned to chart prominence starting in the late 2000s, with albums such as Graffiti Soul (2009), Walk Between Worlds (2018) and Direction of the Heart (2022).

Simple Minds have sold more than 60 million albums worldwide and were the most commercially successful Scottish band of the 1980s. They were awarded the Q Inspiration Award in 2014 for their contribution to the music industry and an Ivor Novello Award in 2016 for Outstanding Song Collection from the British Academy of Songwriters, Composers, and Authors (BASCA). Their other notable recognitions include nominations for both the MTV Video Music Award for Best Direction and MTV Video Music Award for Best Art Direction for "Don't You (Forget About Me)" in 1985, nomination for the Brit Award for British Group in 1986 and for the American Music Award for Favorite Pop/Rock Band/Duo/Group in 1987. "Belfast Child" was nominated for the Song of the Year at the 1990 Brit Awards.

=== Recent activity ===
Burchill continues to record and tour with Simple Minds, who released their latest album Direction of the Heart in October 2022. Three UK club dates in the spring of 2010 featured both new material and Simple Minds' back catalogue and a full European tour followed. In October 2025, Burchill and Kerr published a joint memoir titled Our Secrets Are The Same.

== Style ==
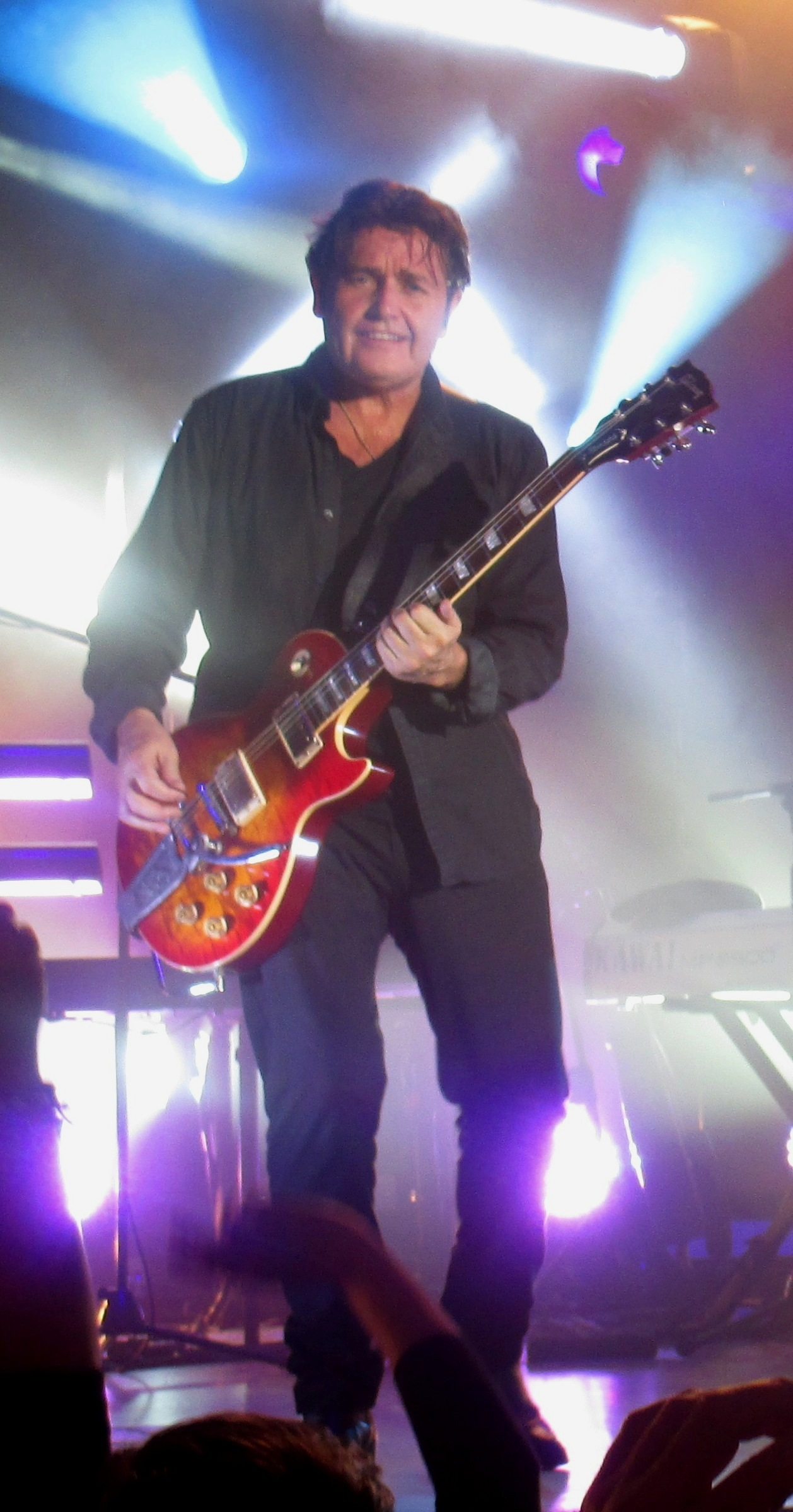
Burchill playing a Gibson Les Paul in February 2015

During Simple Minds' early-to-mid-1980s period, Burchill's guitar had a distinctive and atmospheric sound. Making heavy use of effects such as delay and chorus, his playing often provided subtle textures behind the band's more drum- and bass-propelled songs. This style was most apparent on 1982's New Gold Dream (81/82/83/84). From 1983's album Sparkle in the Rain onwards the group evolved a different style, bringing Burchill's playing more into the foreground.

As well as providing guitar, Burchill played violin and saxophone on the band's first three studio albums and took over most studio keyboard duties following the 1989 departure of Mick MacNeil.

== Equipment ==
Burchill has been playing a Gretsch White Falcon since the early 1980s. He also has a modern one in Black, and a number of 1969 Gibson Les Pauls. As of 2017 he uses Matchless amplifiers. He also plays Starplayer TV guitars made by Duesenberg_Guitars in Germany.
