= Sanctify Yourself =

Single by Simple Minds

from the album Once Upon a Time
- A-side: "Sanctify Yourself"
- B-side: "Sanctify Yourself" (Instrumental)
- Released: 20 January 1986 (UK)
- Recorded: 1985
- Genre: New wave, synth-rock, dance-rock
- Length: 5:00 (album version); 3:55 (single edit); 7:10 (Extended Mix); 6:10 (Dub version)
- Label: Virgin
- Songwriters: Jim Kerr, Charlie Burchill, Mick MacNeil
- Producers: Jimmy Iovine, Bob Clearmountain

Simple Minds singles chronology
"Alive and Kicking" (1985)	"Sanctify Yourself" (1986)	"All the Things She Said" (1986)

"Sanctify Yourself" is a song released by Scottish rock band Simple Minds as the second single from their seventh studio album Once Upon a Time (1985) in January 1986. The song reached number 10 in the UK Singles Chart and number 14 on the US Billboard Hot 100.

== Background ==
Singer Jim Kerr said about the song, "It came from Jimmy Iovine, who produced us. We had the riff for that. We all like gospel music and we're big fans of Sly & the Family Stone, as well. They were quite an influence on that song."

== Reception ==
Cash Box said that it "finds the friendly, warm sound of Simple Minds in full bloom."

== Charts ==
=== Weekly charts ===
Chart (1986–1987)	Peak position
Australia (Kent Music Report)	46
Canada Top Singles (RPM)	17
Canada Top Singles (The Record)	26
Germany	38
Ireland (IRMA)	4
Netherlands	3
New Zealand	22
Sweden	16
UK Singles Chart	10
US Billboard Hot 100	14
US Cash Box Top 100	10

=== Year-end charts ===
Chart (1986)	Rank
U.S. Cash Box	94

== Sales ==
Region	Certification	Certified units/sales
United Kingdom	—	92,395
