= Don't You (Forget About Me) =

1985 single by Simple Minds

Single by Simple Minds

from the album The Breakfast Club (Original Motion Picture Soundtrack)
- B-side: "A Brass Band in African Chimes"
- Released: 20 February 1985
- Recorded: November 1984
- Genre: New wave; synth-pop; pop rock; synth-rock; pop
- Length: 4:23 (original version); 6:36 (extended version)
- Label: Virgin; A&M (US)
- Songwriters: Keith Forsey; Steve Schiff
- Producer: Keith Forsey

Simple Minds singles chronology
"Up on the Catwalk" (1984)	"Don't You (Forget About Me)" (1985)	"Alive and Kicking" (1985)

Audio sample
- "Don't You (Forget About Me)": file; help

Music video
- "Don't You (Forget About Me)" on YouTube

"Don't You (Forget About Me)" is a song by the Scottish rock band Simple Minds, released as a single in 1985. It was written and composed by the record producer Keith Forsey and the guitarist Steve Schiff for the film The Breakfast Club (1985). Simple Minds initially declined to record it, preferring to record their own material, but accepted after several other acts also declined.

"Don't You (Forget About Me)" became a breakout hit for Simple Minds, an iconic song and a 1980s anthem. The single was released on 20 February 1985 in the US and 9 April in the UK, becoming Simple Minds' biggest hit in North America, reaching No. 1 in both the United States and Canada. It also reached No. 7 on the UK singles chart and reached the top ten in charts around the world.

== Recording ==
"Don't You (Forget About Me)" was written by Steve Schiff and Keith Forsey for the film The Breakfast Club (1985). Forsey and Schiff were inspired by a scene in which an introvert and a school bully bond while no one else is watching. Forsey said, "It was: don't forget, when we're back in the classroom, you're not just a bad guy and we've got other things in common."

Simple Minds initially declined to record "Don't You (Forget About Me)", as they felt they should only record their own material. Their guitarist, Charlie Burchill, said they felt it did not suit them as "we had delusions of being ultra-hip". Their manager, Bruce Findlay, believed it would be successful in the United States. He arranged a private screening of The Breakfast Club in an effort to change their minds, but they still declined. Their lead vocalist, Jim Kerr, later said: "We couldn't give a toss about teenage American schoolkids."

Forsey offered "Don't You (Forget About Me)" to Bryan Ferry of Roxy Music, who declined as he was working on his album Boys and Girls (1985). Ferry later said: "It was just bad timing ... Keith Forsey sent me a demo of the song and it sounded like a hit to me." The record label, A&M, suggested Corey Hart, who had a hit at the time with "Sunglasses at Night", but Forsey did not think he was the right singer. Forsey's frequent collaborator Billy Idol also declined.

Kerr's wife, Chrissie Hynde of the Pretenders, liked the song and urged him to record it. Simple Minds agreed to try it after spending a few days with Forsey and becoming friends. They were impressed by Forsey's work in German experimental music, such as Amon Düül II, and his work with Giorgio Moroder, including "I Feel Love" by Donna Summer.

Kerr added the "hey hey hey" to the introduction and the "la la la" to the ending, intending to write new lyrics, but Forsey insisted on keeping them. Burchill added power chords, and said later: "It was almost a caricature – I associated powerchords with American AOR. But it worked." The Financial Times wrote that the chords "[helped] turn Forsey's sweet paean to teenage longing into a rousing, stadium-sized anthem".

Simple Minds did not anticipate the song's success. In 2016, Burchill said: "When I listen to it now, it’s obviously a brilliant, well-crafted pop song. I’m embarrassed we dissed it so much."

== Release and critical reception ==
"Don't You (Forget About Me)" was played during the opening and closing credits of The Breakfast Club (1985). It was included on the film's soundtrack. "Don't You (Forget About Me)" was released as a single in February 1985 in the United States and reached No. 1 on the Billboard Hot 100 in May 1985. The song reached No. 1 in Canada in June 1985. It is the band's only number-one hit on the US Top Rock Tracks chart, staying atop that chart for three weeks. The song became Simple Minds' breakout hit, as well as their biggest American hit.

Cash Box said that "though the lyric theme is a simple enough declaration, the lead vocals and vivid orchestration make the tune complex and moving". The song was included on the band's greatest hits compilation album, Glittering Prize 81/92 (1992). It soon became a fixture of the band's live sets, with an extended audience participation section during its inclusion on the 2015 tour to promote the band's Big Music album.

John Leland of Spin described the song as "a romantic and melancholy dance track" that "cuts ice both in the living room and on the dance floor". The song has become iconic, and has been described by American Songwriter as "an ‘80s masterpiece" and "an American teen anthem".

== Cover version ==
Billy Idol recorded a version of "Don't You (Forget About Me)" for his 2001 compilation album Greatest Hits released by Capitol Records.

In February 2021, indie folk band Boy & Bear along with Annie Hamilton covered "Don't You (Forget About Me)" for Australian youth radio station Triple J's Like a Version.

Darren Criss, Jenna Ushkowitz, and Chord Overstreet covered the song in Glee episode Trio in Season Five.

== Music video ==
The music video – filmed inside Knebworth House, Hertfordshire, England – was directed by Daniel Kleinman. It takes place in a darkened room with a chandelier, a rocking horse, a jukebox, and television sets displaying scenes from The Breakfast Club. The room gets increasingly cluttered with random objects as the video progresses until the last minute. The video was published on YouTube on 3 December 2010; as of August 2026, it had been viewed more than 434 million times.

== Track listing ==
=== 7" Vinyl (UK & US) ===
1. "Don't You (Forget About Me)" – 4:20
2. "A Brass Band in Africa" – 5:10

=== 12" Vinyl (UK & US) ===
1. "Don't You (Forget About Me)" – 6:32
2. "A Brass Band in African Chimes" – 9:22

=== 12" Vinyl (Canada) ===
1. "Don't You (Forget About Me)" (extended version) – 6:32
2. "Don't You (Forget About Me)" – 4:20
3. "A Brass Band in Africa" – 5:10

=== 1988 3" CD (UK) ===
1. "Don't You (Forget About Me)" – 4:20
2. "A Brass Band in African Chimes" – 9:22

=== 1988 CD (US) ===
1. "Don't You (Forget About Me)" (live) – 9:02
2. "Bass Line" – 4:37
3. "The American" – 3:33

=== 1990 CD (UK) ===
1. "Don't You (Forget About Me)" – 6:35
2. "Up on the Catwalk" (extended version) – 7:36
3. "A Brass Band in African Chimes" – 9:24

== Charts ==
=== Weekly charts ===
1985 weekly chart performance for "Don't You (Forget About Me)"
Chart (1985)	Peak position
Australia (Kent Music Report)	6
Austria (Ö3 Austria Top 40)	5
Belgium (Ultratop 50 Flanders)	2
Canada Retail Singles (The Record)	2
Canada Top Singles (RPM)	1
Europe (European Top 100 Singles)	2
Finland (Suomen virallinen lista)	20
France (SNEP)	24
Greece (IFPI)	3
Ireland (IRMA)	3
Italy (Musica e dischi)	2
Netherlands (Dutch Top 40)	1
Netherlands (Single Top 100)	2
New Zealand (Recorded Music NZ)	3
South Africa (Springbok Radio)	10
Sweden (Sverigetopplistan)	13
Switzerland (Schweizer Hitparade)	8
UK Singles (Official Charts)	7
US Billboard Hot 100	1
US Adult Contemporary (Billboard)	36
US Dance Club Songs (Billboard)	9
US Dance Singles Sales (Billboard)	7
US Mainstream Rock Airplay (Billboard)	1
US Cash Box Top 100	1
West Germany (GfK)	4

1988 weekly chart performance for "Don't You (Forget About Me)"
Chart (1988)	Peak position
UK Singles (Official Charts)	100

2004 weekly chart performance for "Don't You (Forget About Me)"
Chart (2004)	Peak position
Italy (FIMI)	16

2021 weekly chart performance for "Don't You (Forget About Me)"
Chart (2021)	Peak position
US Hot Rock & Alternative Songs (Billboard)	14
US Rock Digital Song Sales (Billboard)	2

2026 weekly chart performance
Chart (2026)	Peak position
Netherlands Airplay (Dutch Charts)	49
Norway Airplay (IFPI Norge)	73

=== Year-end charts ===
Year-end chart performance for "Don't You (Forget About Me)"
Chart (1985)	Position
Australia (Kent Music Report)	47
Austria (Ö3 Austria Top 40)	28
Belgium (Ultratop 50 Flanders)	1
Canada Top Singles (RPM)	21
Europe (European Top 100 Singles)	9
Netherlands (Dutch Top 40)	8
Netherlands (Single Top 100)	11
New Zealand (Recorded Music NZ)	26
Switzerland (Schweizer Hitparade)	26
UK Singles (Gallup)	65
US Billboard Hot 100	16
US Dance Singles Sales (Billboard)	33
US Mainstream Rock (Billboard)	10
US Cash Box Top 100	12
West Germany (Official German Charts)	23

== Certifications ==
Region	Certification	Certified units/sales
Canada (Music Canada)	Platinum	100,000^{^}
Denmark (IFPI Danmark)	Gold	45,000^{‡}
Germany (BVMI)	Gold	250,000^{‡}
Italy (FIMI)	Platinum	70,000^{‡}
New Zealand (RMNZ)	5× Platinum	150,000^{‡}
Spain (Promusicae) 2001 remastered version	Platinum	60,000^{‡}
United Kingdom (BPI) 1985 physical release	Silver	250,000^{^}
United Kingdom (BPI) 2004 digital release	3× Platinum	1,800,000^{‡}
^{^} Shipments figures based on certification alone.^{‡} Sales+streaming figures based on certification alone.

== Personnel ==
Simple Minds

- Jim Kerr – lead vocals
- Charlie Burchill – guitar, keyboards
- Mick MacNeil – keyboards
- Derek Forbes – bass guitar
- Mel Gaynor – drums, percussion

== See also ==
- List of number-one singles of 1985 (Canada)
- List of Billboard Hot 100 number-one singles of the 1980s
- List of Billboard Hot 100 number ones of 1985
- List of Billboard Mainstream Rock number-one songs of the 1980s
- List of Dutch Top 40 number-one singles of 1985
