= Bruce Becker =

American drummer (born 1959)

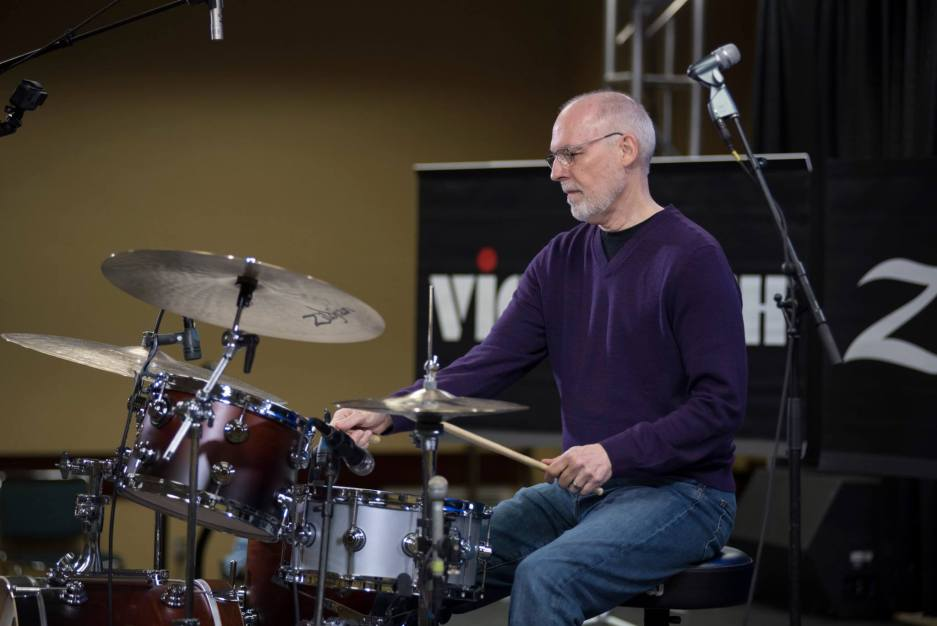
- Bruce Becker Drumset Master Class Presentation – PASIC 2017

Background information
- Born: Bruce Becker; April 3, 1959 (age 67); Cincinnati, Ohio
- Genres: Jazz; Rock; Blues; Pop
- Occupations: Drummer, teacher
- Years active: 1982–present
- Labels: MCA; Bluemoon; Acoustic Music
- Website: brucebecker.com

Bruce Becker (born April 3, 1959) is an American drummer, author and drum teacher based in Los Angeles and has been teaching in the US and abroad since 1982. As a drummer with a variety of jazz, rock, and pop artists, Becker has recorded over twenty albums.

== Educator ==
=== Studies ===
Becker was a longtime student of Freddie Gruber (whose other students included Dave Weckl, Neil Peart, and Steve Smith), Becker was on the inside track of Gruber's world and has developed and extended Gruber's ideas about drum technique, including "the balance and motion of the stick," and understanding the natural principles of the physical body's interaction with the drum set.

Becker's yoga practice has also incorporated a "Mind-Body Connection" component into his teachings. Becker did 5 Master Classes with Gruber and would demonstrate the concepts while Gruber expounded on the details behind the technique involved. In addition to studying with Gruber, Becker studied with classical percussionist Karen Ervin at the Department of Music at California State University, Northridge, percussionist Jerry Steinholz, and jazz drummer and author Jim Chapin.

=== Students ===
Becker's technique insights have been sought after by students such as David Garibaldi, Tris Imboden, Jiro Yamaguchi (Ozomatli), Jake Slichter (Semisonic), Mark Schulman, and Daniel Glass and have been featured in DrumHead Magazine, Edge Magazine, and DRUMscene.

=== Instruction ===
Becker has conducted master classes at numerous music conservatories and schools in the USA, Germany, Italy, Belgium, Austria, the Netherlands, Latvia, Russia, Argentina, Uruguay, and Australia. In November 2017 Becker presented a Drumset Master Clinic at Percussive Art Society's International Convention (PASIC) – Indianapolis, IN.

In 2018, Becker created a technique course, "Drum Technique Made Easy," for Drumeo and has been a regular contributor to Drum Channel's live-streamed lessons. His instructional DVD, Concepts and Philosophies, was released in 2013 by Drum Channel and re-released by Hudson Music in 2020.

== Author ==
Fueled by a desire to impart his knowledge and expertise to aspiring musicians, Becker has authored two instructional books:

- 2018: Puzzles, Rhymes and Riddles (Hudson Music)
- 2023: The Ultimate Guide to Syncopation (Hudson Music)

== Performer ==
Becker, along with brother David Becker, is the drummer and co-founder of the David Becker Tribune, which was signed to MCA Records jazz division in 1986. With the David Becker Tribune, he has recorded and co-produced ten albums and performed around the world for more than three decades.

From 1992 to 1997 Becker lived in Antwerp and Vienna, where he performed with German jazz organist Barbara Dennerlein and Belgian blues artist Luke Walter Jr. Becker was part of an ensemble of great musicians on the 2015 release honoring Hungarian jazz guitarist, Attila Zoller, Message To Attila, playing with Ron Carter, Mike Stern, John Abercrombie and others. As a drummer, producer, and vocalist, Becker has worked with numerous Los Angeles-based pop, rock and jazz artists.

== Discography ==
=== With David Becker Tribune ===
- 1986: Long Peter Madsen (MCA)
- 1988: Siberian Express (MCA)
- 1990: Third Time Around (Bluemoon)
- 1991: In Motion (MCA)
- 1995: Nevsky Prospekt (Pinorrekk)
- 2001: Germica (Silverline)
- 2004: Where's Henning? (Acoustic Music)
- 2005: The Color of Sound (Acoustic Music)
- 2007: Leaving Argentina (Acoustic Music)
- 2010: Batavia (Acoustic Music)
- 2013: Distance Traveled (Acoustic Music)
- 2018: Kiwi Dreams (Acoustic Music)

=== With others ===
- 2007: Mudpies – Yvonne Perea (Yvonne Perea)
- 2009: Everything Changes – Yvonne Perea (Yvonne Perea)
- 2010: Fingers in the Pie – Steve Craig (Steve Craig)
- 2011: Grateful Moon – Sarah Morris (Waterbury Records)
- 2014: 10 West – Todd Wallin (Coastgs Records)
- 2015: Personal Elegy – Chris Field (Chris Field)
- 2015: Message to Attila – Various Artists (Enja Records)
- 2016: Earth and Sky – Steve Craig (Steve Craig)
- 2019: Lucky Me – Yvonne Perea (Yvonne Perea)

== Books / DVDs ==
- Puzzles, Rhymes and Riddles: Solutions in Odd Time Phrasing (BruBecker, 2016 Hudson Digital, 2018)
- Concepts and Philosophies: A Comprehensive Approach for the Development of Drum Technique (BruBecker, 2013, Drum Channel Digital, 2014, Hudson Music, 2020)
