= Caleb Chapman's Soundhouse =

Musician performance training program in Pleasant Grove, Utah

- Type: Private
- Industry: Music and Performance Education
- Founder: Caleb Chapman
- Headquarters: Pleasant Grove, Utah, US
- Area served: Worldwide
- Key people: Caleb Chapman (Founder & Chief Executive Producer), Andrew Surmani (CEO), Jim Detjen, Rick Drumm
- Number of employees: 40
- Website: www.ccsoundhouse.com

Caleb Chapman's Soundhouse is a musician performance training program based in Pleasant Grove, Utah. It was founded by Caleb Chapman in 1998.

Soundhouse has 25 bands with musicians aged 8 – 18, as well as some adult groups, in the genres of jazz, soul, swing, rock, reggae, funk, and fusion. The program teaches a multi-disciplinary skill set (such as business, showmanship, management, and marketing). Members of the groups rotate each year and manage the operations and promotion of the bands. They have recorded and released four albums. The executive leadership team includes Caleb Chapman (Founder and chairman) and Andrew Surmani (CEO).

== Awards ==
Bands and members of the program have received awards, such as:

- 85 DownBeat Awards
- 32 Best of State Medals for arts and education category
- 3 Best of State Statue (BOSS) Awards from Utah

Every member of the program has received scholarship offers for colleges and universities, averaging a collective $1 million each year (with a total of $2.5 million in 2016).

== Alumni ==
Prominent Soundhouse alumni include:

- Andrew Tolman, previously Imagine Dragons and currently Moth & the Flame
- Jaydon Bean, Redlight King
- Chase Baird, Saxophonist & Recording Artist
- Haven Mcgee, Vocalist
- Evan Wharton, Anchorage
- Caleb Chapman, Saxophonist and Entertainer

Alumni have also gone on to attend universities such as The Juilliard School, Berklee College of Music, the New England Conservatory of Music, University of Southern California, University of Miami, University of North Texas, Eastman School of Music, Georgetown, Snow College, and Brigham Young University.

== Groups ==
Current groups include:

- The flagship ensemble Caleb Chapman's Crescent Super Band (Modern Big Band/American Songbook)
- Time Check Jazz Orchestra (Big Band Jazz)
- Voodoo Orchestra (Jump Swing)
- La Onda Caribeña (Latin Jazz & Salsa)
- Soul Research Foundation (Motown Soul)
- Vicious Beat (Pop & R&B)
- The Inevitables (Swing & Alternative)
- Hooligans Brass Band (New Orleans Brass Band)
- Little Big Band (Big Band Jazz)
- New Bop Big Band (Big Band Jazz)
- Oo La La (Vocal Jazz)
- Siren Sounds (Vocal Jazz)
- Kingston Winter (Reggae)
- Lo-Fi Riot (Ska)
- Jukebox Antihero (Classic Rock)

Bands from the program have performed in Carnegie Hall, Telluride Jazz Celebration, North Sea Jazz Festival, Montreux Jazz Festival, Vienne Jazz Festival, Umbria Jazz Festival, Jazz Education Network Conferences, The Midwest Clinic, The Apollo Theater, and The Utah Jazz basketball games. Outside of the U.S., bands from the program have performed in Cuba, France, Italy, Sweden, Mexico, Canada, the Netherlands, Switzerland, England, and Scotland. They have performed alongside GRAMMY-winners Joe Lovano, Nicholas Payton, Gordon Goodwin, Dave Weckl, Brian Lynch, Poncho Sanchez, Dave Samuels, Jeff Coffin, Esperanza Spalding, Randy Brecker, Ernie Watts, Christian McBride, Bob Mintzer, Peter Erskine, David Paich, Branford Marsalis, and Kirk Whalum.

Guest artists have included members from: Dave Matthews Band, Toto, Maroon 5, Journey, Big Bad Voodoo Daddy, Tower of Power, The Rolling Stones, Genesis, and the Saturday Night Live Band.
