= Caleb Chapman =

American musician

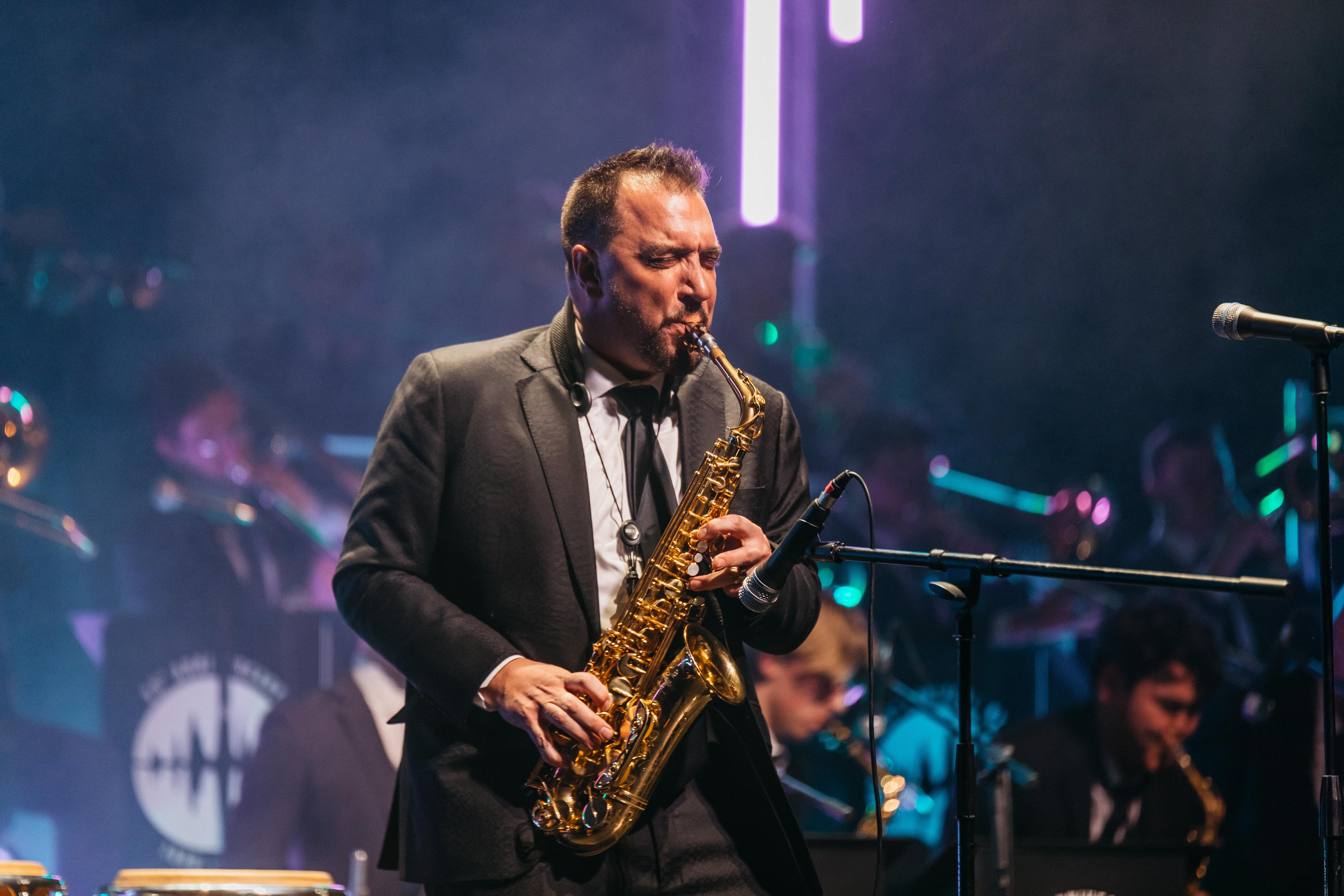
- Born: Caleb Paul Chapman; August 15, 1973 (age 52); Derry, New Hampshire
- Occupation(s): Founder and CEO of Caleb Chapman's Soundhouse; Director of the Crescent Super Band

Caleb Chapman (born August 15, 1973) is an American GRAMMY-nominated bandleader, music educator, author, entrepreneur, producer, motivational speaker, and musician from Derry, New Hampshire, who currently resides in Utah. A graduate of Brigham Young University, he is the founder and CEO of Caleb Chapman's Soundhouse, a music performance training program headquartered in Pleasant Grove, Utah and the director of Caleb Chapman's Crescent Super Band. Chapman has been recognized for his significant contributions to music education and has received numerous honors for his work as an educator, performer, and business leader.

== Music Educator ==
=== Caleb Chapman's Soundhouse ===
Chapman launched Caleb Chapman's Soundhouse in 1998 and continues to oversee the 20+ award-winning bands and nearly 400 musicians in the program. He personally directs Caleb Chapman's Crescent Super Band, the Voodoo Orchestra, Caleb Chapman's Little Big Band, and La Onda Caribeña. His bands have been featured on the Sirius XM “Real Jazz” Channel and released 10 full-length albums on the Big Swing Face record label.

The Utah-based Caleb Chapman's Soundhouse trains young musicians of all ability levels, providing opportunities to perform, tour, and work with celebrity musicians. Former graduates of the program include Wayne Sermon and Andrew Tolman (both founding members of Imagine Dragons), as well as Ritt Momney.

Soundhouse alumni have received scholarships at top music schools around the country including Juilliard, the University of Miami, the Berklee College of Music, University of Southern California the New England Conservatory, and the Manhattan School of Music.

=== Presentations and Clinics ===
Chapman has been invited to present at various conferences including the Midwest Clinic, the Jazz Education Network (JEN) Annual Conference, and various state music educator conferences across the United States.

Chapman is a featured clinician for the Yamaha Corporation, D'Addario, JodyJazz Mouthpieces, and KeyLeaves.

== Saxophonist ==
=== Osmond Chapman Orchestra ===
Chapman co-founded the Osmond Chapman Orchestra with longtime collaborator, David Osmond, part of the musical Osmond family and nephew of Donny Osmond and Marie Osmond. The band's debut album, "There's More Where That Came From" was released on Club 44 Records in June of 2016. The album release concert was held at the Rose Bowl on a double bill with Earth, Wind and Fire.

=== Neon Trees ===
In 2017 Chapman was invited by bassist Branden Campbell to perform with the Neon Trees at Dan Reynolds' inaugural LoveLoud Festival opening for Imagine Dragons. The following year, Chapman joined the band as a touring member on their US tour which included performances at Hollywood's Troubadour and Manhattan's Bowery Ballroom.

=== NBA Anthem Performances ===
Chapman has performed the national anthem on solo saxophone at National Basketball Association (NBA) games for the Boston Celtics, the Miami Heat, the Denver Nuggets, the Washington Wizards, and the Utah Jazz.

=== Studio Recordings ===
Chapman has been featured on scores of studio recordings, including sessions with the National Parks band, GRAMMY-winning DJ, Kaskade, Sunfall Festival, and many others.

== Key Performances ==
=== Festivals ===
Chapman's bands have been featured at many festivals worldwide including the Fiesta Del Tambor (Cuba), the North Sea Jazz Festival (Netherlands), the Montreux Jazz Festival (Switzerland), Jazz a Vienne (France), the Umbria Jazz Festival (Italy), Tuscany Jazz Festival (Italy), Birmingham Jazz Festival (UK), and the Puerto Vallarta Jazz & World Music Festival (Mexico). Chapman has also had feature performances in China, Spain, Canada, Denmark, Croatia, and several other countries.

Chapman and his bands are a staple at the Telluride Jazz Festival where they have held a spot on the main stage virtually every year since 2008. They have frequently been joined by guest artists at the festival including National Endowment for the Arts Jazz Master Toshiko Akiyoshi, Lew Tabackin, and Joe Lovano among others. In 2022, Stanton Moore invited Chapman to guest with Galactic on their headlining performance at the festival.

=== Carnegie Hall ===
In May 2013, Chapman and the Crescent Super Band headlined a concert at New York's famed Carnegie Hall, featuring GRAMMY-winning saxophonist David Sanborn and trumpeter Wayne Bergeron.

=== Jazz at Lincoln Center ===
Chapman and the Crescent Super Band were invited by Wynton Marsalis to perform in the 2016 EssentiallY Ellington Festival at Jazz at Lincoln Center, part of the Lincoln Center for the Performing Arts complex in New York City.

=== Jazz Education Network Annual Conference ===
Chapman and the Crescent Super Band are one of just a handful of groups invited to perform multiple times on evening concerts at the Jazz Education Network's annual conference. In 2014, they headlined one of the evening concerts with special guests Randy Brecker and Ed Calle. In 2017 they were featured at the conference in New Orleans with Branford Marsalis, Victor Wooten, Randy Brecker, Kirk Whalum, John Beasley, Rashawn Ross (of the Dave Matthews Band), Jeff Coffin, David Paich, Tony Dagradi, Stanton Moore, and Johnny Vidacovich. In 2022 Chapman and the Crescent Super Band were again invited to headline one of the evening concerts at the conference in Dallas, Texas with guests Tom Malone and Randy Brecker.

=== National Basketball Association (NBA) ===
Chapman and the Crescent Super Band have been invited to play during the halftime show for the NBA’s Utah Jazz basketball team on many occasions. Most recently, they were invited to perform along with NBA personality Thurl Bailey at the 2023 NBA All Star Weekend in Salt Lake City, Utah.

== Collaborations ==
Chapman and his bands have worked with more than 250 artists, including GRAMMY award winners David Paich of Toto, Jeff Coffin of Dave Matthews Band, Randy Brecker of Blood, Sweat, and Tears, Branford Marsalis, Victor Wooten, Joe Lovano, Christian McBride, Peter Erskine, Kirk Whalum, Kurt Elling, Gordon Goodwin, Esperanza Spalding, Poncho Sanchez, Brian Lynch, Wayne Bergeron, Dave Weckl, Nicholas Payton, Eric Marienthal, Ernie Watts, and Bob Mintzer.

Chapman has also worked with members of such well-known groups as The Killers, Living Colour, the Dave Matthews Band, Maroon 5, AC/DC, Neon Trees, Big Bad Voodoo Daddy, Tower of Power, the Blues Brothers, the Brian Setzer Orchestra, Genesis, Journey, the Saturday Night Live Band, and many others. Chapman has said that it is a priority for him to provide the opportunity for young musicians to perform with A-list artists, and have frequent touring and performing experiences.

== Personal life ==
Chapman was born in Peterborough, New Hampshire. At the age of 3, his family moved to Derry, New Hampshire where he lived until leaving for college in 1991.

Chapman and his wife, Tommie, currently live in Orem, Utah. He is the father of four children and five step-children, many of whom have also found success in the music industry.

== Awards and honors ==
=== State of Utah ===
In 2023, Utah Governor Spencer Cox declared January 25 to be "Caleb Chapman's Soundhouse Day in Utah" in recognition of "the many contributions that Caleb Chapman and the Soundhouse have made to music education, culture, the music industry and Utah."

On January 4, 2021 Utah celebrated 125 years of statehood and marked the occasion with a television special "Thrive125: A Utah Celebration" that aired on all four Utah network affiliates and PBS. Governor Spencer Cox requested that Chapman, along with David Osmond and the Crescent Super Band close out the special with a performance of "The Way You Look Tonight".

While serving as Utah governor, Gary Herbert honored Chapman with the 2013 "Utah Performing Artist Award" in a special dinner reception at the Governor's Mansion. The following year Herbert appointed Chapman to the Utah Arts Council Board of Directors as the board representative for the music discipline. Herbert invited Chapman and his band to be the featured performers at the annual Governor's Gala on multiple occasions.

=== DownBeat Magazine ===
Since 2005, Caleb’s program has been honored with 109 different awards by DownBeat Magazine. As the oldest publication in the jazz industry, DownBeat celebrates high-caliber jazz education with its annual awards. The Crescent Super Band, the Voodoo Orchestra, the Soul Research Foundation, Caleb Chapman’s Little Big Band, the Hooligans Brass Band, Lo-Fi Riot, La Onda Caribeña, and several other Soundhouse bands have all been recognized with at least one award from the magazine.

In 2015 DownBeat Magazine honored Chapman with their "Jazz Education Achievement Award".

=== Utah Best of State Awards ===
On multiple occasions Chapman was selected as "Best Educator" in the Music Education category and in 2016, the "Best Educator" in all categories, by the Utah Best of State awards. In total, Chapman and his program have received over 50 Best of State medals and 3 Best of State Statue Awards since 2007.

=== Pinkerton Academy ===
In 2015 Chapman was inducted in to the Pinkerton Academy Hall of Fame in Derry, New Hampshire joining other notable members such as poet Robert Frost and astronaut Alan Shepard.

=== Jazz Band of America ===
In 2013 Chapman was appointed Director of the prestigious Jazz Band of America, an all-star jazz band consisting of the top high school jazz students from across the United States sponsored by Bands of America. The group performed at the Music for All National Festival in Indianapolis in March, 2014 along with guest artist, Robin Eubanks. Chapman joins a list of past directors and guest artists with the ensemble that include Wynton Marsalis, Patti Austin, Wayne Bergeron, Wycliffe Gordon, and Ndugu Chancler, among others.

=== John LaPorta Award ===
In 2011 Chapman was named the "John LaPorta International Jazz Educator of the Year" by Berklee College of Music and the Jazz Education Network. The Berklee President at the time, Roger Brown, presented Chapman with the award in a ceremony at the JEN Conference in New Orleans.

=== Snow College ===
In 2007 Chapman was named the inaugural inductee of Snow College's Horne School of Music Hall of Fame.

== Nonprofit Work ==
=== Sound Support Foundation ===
In 2023 Chapman launched his charity, the Sound Support Foundation. The organization is a 501(c)(3) nonprofit with the aim of providing music and performance scholarships to youth and training opportunities to educators.

=== Jazz Education Network ===
From 2016-2018 Chapman held the title of President of the Jazz Education Network, a 501(c)(3) nonprofit that serves the jazz arts community by advancing education, promoting performance, and developing new audiences. He also designed and launched the organization's JENerations Jazz Festival in 2014. The festival is held concurrently with JEN's annual conference, and features student groups who perform for celebrity clinicians in a non-competitive adjudicated festival environment.

In his tenure as president, Chapman doubled the organization's membership.

== Publications ==
=== Books ===
In 2013, Caleb released a method book with Alfred Music, titled The Articulate Jazz Musician. The book focuses on Chapman's celebrated method for teaching jazz articulation and style to young musicians. It features 14 original tunes from multi-GRAMMY-winning member of the Dave Matthews Band, Jeff Coffin, and a play-along CD that includes Coffin, Chris Walters, and GRAMMY winners Victor Wooten and Roy “Futureman” Wooten.

Chapman was invited by Mary Jo Papich to be a contributor to the 2019 book, "Rehearsing the Jazz Band" released by Meredith Publishing. Among additional contributors to the book are several Chapman collaborators, including Gordon Goodwin, John Clayton, Greg Yasinitsky, and Steve Wiest, among others.

=== Articles ===
Chapman has had his articles published in leading music industry publications including DownBeat Magazine and JAZZed Magazine.

Previously, Chapman authored a column on arts education titled "Sound Thinking" for the Utah Daily Herald newspaper. The articles covered topics such as mentoring, helping young students decide which instrument to play, and how parents can help their children discover their educational passions.
