= Caleb Chapman's Crescent Super Band =

Music group

- Genres: Jazz, big band
- Years active: 2001–present
- Labels: Big Swing Face Records, Ear Up Records, R Legacy Entertainment

Caleb Chapman's Crescent Super Band is a music group directed by Caleb Chapman. It consists of 25 musicians aged 15–18 and is the flagship ensemble for Caleb Chapman's Soundhouse, an after school professional musician training program based in Utah.

== History ==
Founded in 2001, the group regularly performs locally and worldwide, having played with guest artists from groups such as Dave Matthews Band, Journey, Big Bad Voodoo Daddy, Tower of Power, The Rolling Stones, and the Saturday Night Live Band. They have also shared the stage with over 200 jazz artists including Joe Lovano, Nicholas Payton, Gordon Goodwin, Dave Weckl, Brian Lynch, Poncho Sanchez, Dave Samuels, Jeff Coffin, Esperanza Spalding, Randy Brecker, Ernie Watts, Christian McBride, Bob Mintzer, and Peter Erskine.

Members may join the group through auditioning and are in the group as long as they are in high school. The members rotate each year.

=== Kickstarter campaign ===
In the fall of 2013, they launched a Kickstarter campaign to help crowd fund their next album, titled "Don't Look Down." The campaign raised the necessary funds from a national community of supporters.

== Performances ==
Caleb Chapman's Crescent Super Band has performed at music festivals including the Montreux Jazz Festival (Switzerland), Fiesta del Tambor (Cuba), Jazz a Vienne (France), MusicFest Canada, the Umbria Jazz Festival (Italy), the North Sea Jazz Festival (The Netherlands), the Berklee Jazz Festival (Boston), the Midwest Clinic (Chicago), the Park City Jazz Festival (Utah), and the Telluride Jazz Festival (Colorado). They had a headlining concert at the 2014 Jazz Education Network conference in Dallas, TX with special guests Randy Brecker and Ed Calle, as well as playing at the Jazz Education Network conference again in New Orleans, January 2017. They have also performed at the Utah Governor's mansion and the Utah State Capitol for multiple gubernatorial events.

In May 2013, the group was invited to perform a headlining set at Carnegie Hall in New York City.

== Awards ==
Having received local and national honors, the group has won Utah's Best of State awards for Best Instrumental Group each year from 2013 to 2020 and Best Vocal/Instrumental Band each year from 2010 to 2020.

Since its inception, the band has also been honored with 33 DownBeat Student Awards by DownBeat Magazine.

== Discography ==
- What It Is, Big Swing Face Records, 2011
- A Crescent Christmas Vol I, R Legacy Entertainment, 2013
- Don’t Look Down, Big Swing Face Records, 2014
- The Inside Of The Outside, Ear Up Records, 2015
- A Crescent Christmas Vol 2, Big Swing Face Records, 2017
