= She's a River =

1995 single by Simple Minds

Single by Simple Minds

from the album Good News from the Next World
- B-side: "E 55"; "Celtic Strings"
- Released: 11 January 1995
- Genre: Rock
- Length: 4:31
- Label: Virgin
- Songwriters: Charlie Burchill; Jim Kerr
- Producers: Keith Forsey; Simple Minds

Simple Minds singles chronology
"Love Song" / "Alive and Kicking" (1992)	"She's a River" (1995)	"Hypnotised" (1995)

Music video
- "She's a River" on YouTube

"She's a River" is the first single released from Scottish rock band Simple Minds' 11th studio album, Good News from the Next World (1995). Written by band members Charlie Burchill and Jim Kerr, the song was inspired by Hermann Hesse's novel Siddhartha, a book about self-discovery. Released on 11 January 1995 by Virgin Records, "She's a River" reached number three in Canada and Italy, number seven in the Flanders region of Belgium, and number nine on the UK Singles Chart. In the United States, it peaked at number six on the Billboard Album Rock Tracks chart.

== Background ==
According to guitarist/keyboardist Charlie Burchill and vocalist Jim Kerr, the song was inspired by Hermann Hesse's novel Siddhartha, which contains themes of self-discovery. Kerr explained, "As [a] younger man I relied so much on this book (among many others) to guide me through my own chaos. That need continues, as does the need to have inspirational music driving me on further still." Kerr went on to describe the storyline near the end of the book that inspired him the most:

Toward the end of his life, Govinda hears about an enlightened ferryman and travels to Siddhartha, not initially recognizing him as his old childhood friend. Govinda asks the now-elderly Siddhartha to relate his wisdom and Siddhartha replies that for every true statement there is an opposite one that is also true; that language and the confines of time lead people to adhere to one fixed belief that does not account for the fullness of the truth. Because nature works in a self-sustaining cycle, every entity carries in it the potential for its opposite and so the world must always be considered complete. Siddhartha simply urges people to identify and love the world in its completeness. Siddhartha then requests that Govinda kiss his forehead and, when he does, Govinda experiences the visions of timelessness that Siddhartha himself saw with Vasudeva by the river. Govinda bows to his wise friend and Siddhartha smiles radiantly, having found enlightenment.

— Jim Kerr,

"She's a River" was the first single released by the band featuring Mark Schulman on drums. Kerr called his performance "brilliant" and one-of-a-kind.

== Chart performance ==
"She's a River" reached number nine on the UK Singles Chart, becoming the band's eighth top-10 hit on that chart, and number five in their native Scotland. Throughout mainland Europe, the song reached number three in Italy, number seven in Flemish Belgium, and the top 40 in several other nations, including Iceland, Ireland, the Netherlands, Sweden, and Switzerland. On the Eurochart Hot 100, it peaked at number 12 during its second week on the chart. In Australasia, "She's a River" reached number 29 in Australia and number 21 in New Zealand.

In Canada, "She's a River" debuted at number 61 on 30 January—the highest debut of the week—and peaked at number three five weeks later, on 13 March. The song stayed on the RPM Top Singles chart for 12 more weeks, and it ended 1995 as Canada's 30th-best-selling single. In the United States, the single peaked at number 52 on the Billboard Hot 100, becoming Simple Minds' first hit in the country since "See the Lights", which reached number 40 in 1991, as well as their last appearance on the Hot 100 as of 2026. It also reached number six on the Billboard Album Rock Tracks chart, number 10 on the Modern Rock Tracks chart, and number 33 on the Top 40/Mainstream chart.

== Track listings ==
- UK CD1
1. "She's a River" (edit)
2. "She's a River" (instrumental)
3. "E 55"
- UK CD2
1. "She's a River" (edit)
2. "She's a River" (Duo mix)
3. "Celtic Strings"
- UK 7-inch and cassette single
- European CD single
- Japanese mini-CD single
1. "She's a River" (edit)
2. "E 55"
- European and Australian maxi-CD single
1. "She's a River" (edit)
2. "She's a River" (instrumental)
3. "E 55"
4. "Celtic Strings"
- US CD and cassette single
1. "She's a River" – 4:29
2. "She's a River" (LP version) – 5:32
3. "She's a River" (Duo mix) – 4:25
4. "E 55" – 5:07

== Charts ==
=== Weekly charts ===
Weekly chart performance for "She's a River"
Chart (1995)	Peak position
Australia (ARIA)	29
Belgium (Ultratop 50 Flanders)	7
Belgium (Ultratop 50 Wallonia)	39
Canada Top Singles (RPM)	3
Europe (Eurochart Hot 100)	12
Europe (European Hit Radio)	1
France Airplay (Music & Media)	1
Germany (GfK)	39
Iceland (Íslenski Listinn Topp 40)	12
Ireland (IRMA)	17
Italy (Musica e dischi)	3
Italy Airplay (Music & Media)	1
Netherlands (Dutch Top 40)	13
Netherlands (Single Top 100)	18
Netherlands Airplay (Music & Media)	7
New Zealand (Recorded Music NZ)	21
Poland Airplay (Music & Media)	1 (Note: The first issue of Music & Media's Polish airplay chart was 4 February 1995, replacing one for the entirety of East-Central Europe that "She's a River" topped. Although "She's a River" was number two on the first week of the chart, it marked its "last-week" position as number one.)
Scottish Singles Sales (Official Charts)	5
Spain Airplay (Music & Media)	1
Sweden (Sverigetopplistan)	26
Switzerland (Schweizer Hitparade)	28
UK Singles (Official Charts)	9
UK Airplay (Music Week)	2
US Billboard Hot 100	52
US Alternative Airplay (Billboard)	10
US Mainstream Rock (Billboard)	6
US Pop Airplay (Billboard)	33

=== Year-end charts ===
Year-end chart performance for "She's a River"
Chart (1995)	Position
Belgium (Ultratop 50 Wallonia)	91
Canada Top Singles (RPM)	30
Europe (European Hit Radio)	18
UK Airplay (Music Week)	39

== Release history ==
Release dates and formats for "She's a River"
Region	Date	Format(s)	Label(s)	Ref.
Japan	11 January 1995	Mini-CD	Virgin	
United Kingdom	16 January 1995	7-inch vinyl; CD1; cassette	Virgin	
United Kingdom	23 January 1995	CD2	Virgin	
Australia	6 February 1995	CD; cassette	Virgin	
