= Staump Music School =

Coordinates: 32°49′53″N 116°59′20″W

Staump Music School is a music education institution in Santee, California, United States.

== History ==
Staump Music School was founded in 2004 by Tim Staump. Since its founding, the school has served more than 3,000 students and is a member of NAMM. Staump Music School participates in regional arts events such as TEDx Kids El Cajon, the Santee Street Fair, and the City of Santee’s Friday Nights Live concert series. In 2024, Fox 5 San Diego featured Staump Music School’s performances. Staump Music School has hosted masterclasses with professional musicians including drummer Mark Schulman, Barrett Yeretsian, Rich Redmond, and Joe Solo.

== Awards ==
- NAMM Top 100 Dealer Finalist (2025)
- Best Music School in Santee (2025)
- Certificate of Recognition (2023)
