= List of colleges and university schools of music in the United States =

This is a list of United States schools of music and colleges and universities with music schools.

== Alabama ==
- The University of Alabama School of Music

== California ==
- California College of Music
- California Institute of the Arts
- California State University, Chico
- California State University, Long Beach Bob Cole Conservatory of Music
- California State University, Northridge
- California State University, Sacramento
- California State University, Stanislaus
- Colburn School
- Los Angeles Film School, Hollywood, L.A., California
- Musicians Institute Contemporary, Hollywood
- San Francisco Conservatory of Music
- University of California, Berkeley
- University of California, Davis
- University of California, Irvine
- University of California, Los Angeles Herb Alpert School of Music
- University of California, Riverside
- University of California, Santa Barbara
- University of California, Santa Cruz
- University of California, San Diego
- University of the Pacific Conservatory of Music
- University of Redlands School of Music
- University of Southern California Thornton School of Music

== Colorado ==
- Colorado State University
- University of Colorado Boulder College of Music
- University of Northern Colorado School of Music

== Connecticut ==
- Hartt School of Music
- Yale University
- University of Connecticut, Storrs
- Western Connecticut State University

== District of Columbia ==
- Catholic University's Benjamin T. Rome School of Music

== Florida ==
- Florida A&M (FAMU)
- Florida Atlantic University
- Florida State University College of Music
- Full Sail University
- Palm Beach Atlantic University
- Palm Beach State College
- Rollins College
- Stetson University
- University of Miami Frost School of Music
- University of Florida
- University of Central Florida
- University of North Florida
- University of South Florida
- University of Tampa

== Georgia ==
- Columbus State University Schwob School of Music
- Georgia Institute of Technology School of Music
- Georgia State University
- Mercer University Townsend School of Music
- The University of Georgia Hodgson School of Music
- Georgia Southern University Department of Music
- University of West Georgia Department of Music

== Idaho ==
- Idaho State University
- University of Idaho

== Illinois ==
- Chicago College of Performing Arts of Roosevelt University
- Columbia College Chicago Music Department
- DePaul University
- Illinois State University
- Northeastern Illinois University
- Northern Illinois University
- Northwestern University Bienen School of Music
- Olivet Nazarene University
- Southern Illinois University Carbondale
- Southern Illinois University Edwardsville
- University of Illinois at Chicago
- University of Illinois School of Music (Urbana, IL)
- Wheaton College Conservatory of Music
- North Park University
- VanderCook College of Music

== Indiana ==
- Ball State University
- Butler University
- DePauw University
- Indiana University Jacobs School of Music
- The Indiana College of Music

== Iowa ==
- Iowa State University
- University of Iowa School of Music
- University of Northern Iowa School of Music

== Kansas ==
- Kansas State University
- University of Kansas
- Wichita State University

== Kentucky ==
- Campbellsville University
- University of Kentucky
- University of Louisville
- Western Kentucky University

== Louisiana ==
- Louisiana Tech University
- LSU
- Northwestern State University
- ULL

== Maine ==
- University of Maine
- University of Southern Maine School of Music

== Maryland ==
- Peabody Conservatory of Johns Hopkins University
- University of Maryland School of Music

== Massachusetts ==
- Berklee College of Music
- Boston Conservatory at Berklee
- Boston University
- Longy School of Music
- New England Conservatory of Music
- University of Massachusetts Amherst

== Michigan ==
- University of Michigan School of Music, Theatre & Dance
- Michigan State University College of Music
- Grand Valley State University Department of Music and Dance
- Western Michigan University
- Eastern Michigan University
- Central Michigan University

== Minnesota ==
- McNally Smith College of Music
- University of Minnesota-Twin Cities
- University of Minnesota-Duluth
- St. Cloud State University

== Mississippi ==
- University of Southern Mississippi
- University of Mississippi

== Missouri ==
- University of Missouri-Kansas City
- University of Missouri School of Music
- Missouri State University

== Nebraska ==
- University of Nebraska - Lincoln School of Music

== Nevada ==
- University of Nevada, Las Vegas School of Music

== New Hampshire ==
- Chosen Vale Center for Advanced Musical Studies

== New Jersey ==
- Kean Jersey City
- Kean University
- Mason Gross School of the Arts of Rutgers University
- John J. Cali School of Music at Montclair State University
- Rowan University
- The College of New Jersey
- Westminster Choir College of Rider University
- William Paterson University

== New York ==
- Adelphi University
- Bard College Conservatory of Music
- Brooklyn College Conservatory of Music
- Crane School of Music
- Aaron Copland School of Music, Queens College, City University of New York
- Eastman School of Music
- Five Towns College
- Ithaca College School of Music
- Juilliard School
- Manhattan School of Music
- Mannes College of Music
- Marist University
- New York University, Steinhardt School
- New York University, Clive Davis Institute of Recorded Music
- Roberts Wesleyan University
- Syracuse University Setnor School of Music
- The New School for Jazz and Contemporary Music
- City College of New York
- Purchase Conservatory of Music
- Hunter College
- Stony Brook University
- AMDA – American Music Drama Academy
- SUNY Fredonia, Fredonia School of Music

== North Carolina ==
- Appalachian State University (Mariam Cannon Hayes School of Music)
- Ambassador Baptist College
- Brevard College
- East Carolina University
- High Point University
- University of North Carolina at Greensboro (UNCG College of Visual and Performing Arts)
- University of North Carolina School of the Arts

== North Dakota ==
- North Dakota State University

== Ohio ==
- Baldwin-Wallace Conservatory of Music
- Bowling Green State University, College of Musical Arts
- Capital University
- Cleveland Institute of Music
- Cleveland State University
- Kent State University
- Oberlin Conservatory
- Ohio State University
- Ohio University
- The University of Akron
- University of Cincinnati College-Conservatory of Music
- Wright State University
- Youngstown State University

== Oklahoma ==
- East Central University
- Oklahoma City University
- University of Oklahoma
- University of Central Oklahoma

== Oregon ==
- University of Oregon
- Portland State University

== Pennsylvania ==
- Carnegie Mellon School of Music
- Curtis Institute of Music
- Duquesne University
- Gettysburg College
- Millersville University School of Music
- Temple University
- The Pennsylvania State University
- Lebanon Valley College
- University of the Arts
- Indiana University of Pennsylvania
- West Chester University

== Puerto Rico ==
- Conservatory of Music of Puerto Rico
- University of Puerto Rico - Department of Music
- Interamerican University of Puerto Rico - Department of Music

== South Carolina ==
- Converse University
- University of South Carolina
- Furman University Department of Music
- Bob Jones University Department of Music

== Tennessee ==
- Austin Peay State University
- Belmont University
- Crown College of the Bible
- Middle Tennessee State University
- Tennessee Technological University
- University of Memphis
- University of Tennessee, Knoxville
- University of Tennessee, Martin
- Blair School of Music, Vanderbilt University
- Lee University

== Texas ==
- Houston Christian University
- Midwestern State University
- Rice University (Shepherd School of Music)
- Sam Houston State University
- Southern Methodist University
- Stephen F. Austin State University
- Texas A&M University-Commerce
- Texas Christian University
- Texas Lutheran University
- Texas Tech University (School of Music)
- University of Houston (Moores School of Music)
- University of North Texas College of Music
- University of Texas (Sarah and Ernest Butler School of Music)

== Utah ==
- Brigham Young University School of Music
- University of Utah
- Utah State University

== Virginia ==
- George Mason University
- James Madison University
- Liberty University
- Virginia Commonwealth University
- Shenandoah Conservatory
- Christopher Newport University
- Longwood University
- Virginia Polytechnic Institute and State University
- Sweet Briar College

== Washington ==
- Cornish College of the Arts
- University of Washington
- Northwest University
- Central Washington University
- University of Puget Sound

== West Virginia ==
- West Virginia University
- West Virginia State University
- Shepherd University
- Marshall University

== Wisconsin ==
- Lawrence Conservatory of Music, Lawrence University
- University of Wisconsin–Madison
- University of Wisconsin–Milwaukee
