= Good News from the Next World =

Studio album by Simple Minds
- Released: 30 January 1995
- Recorded: 1993–1994
- Studios: Bonnie Wee (Scotland); Windmill Lane (Dublin, Ireland); Conway, Westlake & Track Records (Los Angeles, California)
- Genres: Pop rock; rock
- Length: 48:20
- Label: Virgin
- Producers: Simple Minds; Keith Forsey

Simple Minds chronology
Glittering Prize 81/92 (1992)	Good News from the Next World (1995)	The Promised (1997)

Simple Minds studio albums chronology
Real Life (1991)	Good News from the Next World (1995)	Néapolis (1998)

Singles from Good News from the Next World
- 1. "She's a River" Released: 11 January 1995; 2. "Hypnotised" Released: 27 March 1995

Good News from the Next World is the tenth studio album by Scottish rock band Simple Minds, released in January 1995 by Virgin Records. The album's recording started in the band's own studio in Perthshire, Scotland, in 1993, and finished in Los Angeles, US, in summer 1994. The two original band members—singer Jim Kerr and guitarist Charlie Burchill—wrote all nine tracks on the album. They were joined by a number of guest musicians for recording sessions. Keith Forsey, who had previously worked with Simple Minds on their breakout single "Don't You (Forget About Me)", shares producing credits with the band.

The lead single from the album, "She's a River", was released in January 1995 to international commercial success, and the album, in some markets, performed somewhat better than their previous record, Real Life (1991), but it quickly faded from public attention, producing only two moderately successful hit singles.

== Commercial performance ==
The album garnered moderate commercial success. In the UK, it reached number 2 and produced two UK top 20 hits: "She's a River" (number 9) and "Hypnotised" (number 18).

- "She's a River", inspired by Hermann Hesse's novel Siddhartha, was also a commercial success worldwide, reaching number 3 in Canada, number 6 on the Billboard Album Rock Tracks chart (now the Mainstream Rock chart) and number 52 on the US Billboard Hot 100. It was their first hit in the United States since "See the Lights" in 1991.
- "Hypnotised" was less successful globally, though it charted in Australia, Canada, Germany, Ireland and Italy.

== Critical reception ==
Professional ratings
Review scores
Source	Rating
AllMusic	2/5 stars
Canoe.ca	2/5 stars
Q	4/5 stars

Good News from the Next World received favourable reviews among critics in the United States. In the UK, it received mixed reviews. John Harris wrote in Melody Maker that the album "approximates the noise that would be made if the entire contents of a music shop were strapped to an Empire transport ship from Star Wars", adding "for all its cod-Wagnerian vastness, there are no tunes." A positive review appeared in Q magazine: "Good News From The Next World is as good as they'll ever get. It's a scream, in the best possible sense", John Aizlewood wrote. Good News from the Next World also received a favourable review from Time Out, while Vox gave an unfavourable review.

== Track listing ==
All tracks are written by Jim Kerr and Charlie Burchill.

No.	Title	Length
1.	"She's a River"	5:32
2.	"Night Music"	5:24
3.	"Hypnotised"	5:53
4.	"Great Leap Forward"	5:56
5.	"7 Deadly Sins"	5:11
6.	"And the Band Played On"	5:32
7.	"My Life"	5:16
8.	"Criminal World"	5:03
9.	"This Time"	4:58

Japanese edition bonus track
No.	Title	Length
10.	"Celtic Strings"	5:15

== Personnel ==
Simple Minds

- Jim Kerr – vocals
- Charlie Burchill – guitar, keyboards

Additional musicians

- Mark Browne – bass
- Malcolm Foster – bass
- Marcus Miller – bass
- Lance Morrison – bass
- Mark Schulman – drums
- Tal Bergman – drums
- Vinnie Colaiuta – drums
- Stefani Spruill – backing vocals
- Pat Hodges – backing vocals
- Maxann Lewis – backing vocals
- Julia Walters – backing vocals

Technical

- Keith Forsey – producer
- Simple Minds – producer
- Brian Reeves – recording
- Tom Lord Alge – mixing
- Chris Fogel – assistant engineer
- Sean O'Dwyer – assistant engineer
- Rob Kirwan – assistant engineer
- Gil Morales – assistant engineer
- Kenny Polakovich – assistant engineer
- Doug Cowan – technical direction
- Tony Donald – equipment
- Clive Banks for CBL – worldwide representation
- Alan McBlane – coordination
- Stylorouge – art direction and design
- David Scheinmann – band photography
- Rob O'Conner – textural photography
- Stuart MacKenzie – textural photography

== Charts ==
=== Weekly charts ===
Weekly chart performance for Good News from the Next World
Chart (1995)	Peak position
Australian Albums (ARIA)	20
Austrian Albums (Ö3 Austria)	6
Belgian Albums (Ultratop Flanders)	21
Belgian Albums (Ultratop Wallonia)	11
Canada Top Albums/CDs (RPM)	37
Dutch Albums (Album Top 100)	5
European Albums (European Top 100 Albums)	2
Finnish Albums (The Official Finnish Charts)	10
German Albums (Offizielle Top 100)	4
New Zealand Albums (RMNZ)	8
Norwegian Albums (VG-lista)	5
Scottish Albums (Official Charts)	1
Swedish Albums (Sverigetopplistan)	2
Swiss Albums (Schweizer Hitparade)	1
UK Albums (Official Charts)	2
US Billboard 200	87

=== Year-end charts ===
1995 year-end chart performance for Good News from the Next World
Chart (1995)	Position
Austrian Albums (Ö3 Austria)	47
Belgian Albums (Ultratop Flanders)	46
Belgian Albums (Ultratop Wallonia)	19
Dutch Albums (Album Top 100)	84
European Albums (European Top 100 Albums)	22
German Albums (Offizielle Top 100)	41
Swedish Albums & Compilations (Sverigetopplistan)	94
Swiss Albums (Schweizer Hitparade)	22
UK Albums (OCC)	81

== Certifications and sales ==
Certifications and sales for Good News from the Next World
Region	Certification	Certified units/sales
Belgium (BRMA)	Gold	25,000^{*}
France (SNEP)	Gold	100,000^{*}
Germany (BVMI)	Gold	250,000^{^}
Italy	—	150,000
Norway (IFPI Norway)	Gold	25,000^{*}
Switzerland (IFPI Switzerland)	Gold	25,000^{^}
United Kingdom (BPI)	Gold	100,000^{^}
^{*} Sales figures based on certification alone.^{^} Shipments figures based on certification alone.
