= Andrew Surmani =

American music executive

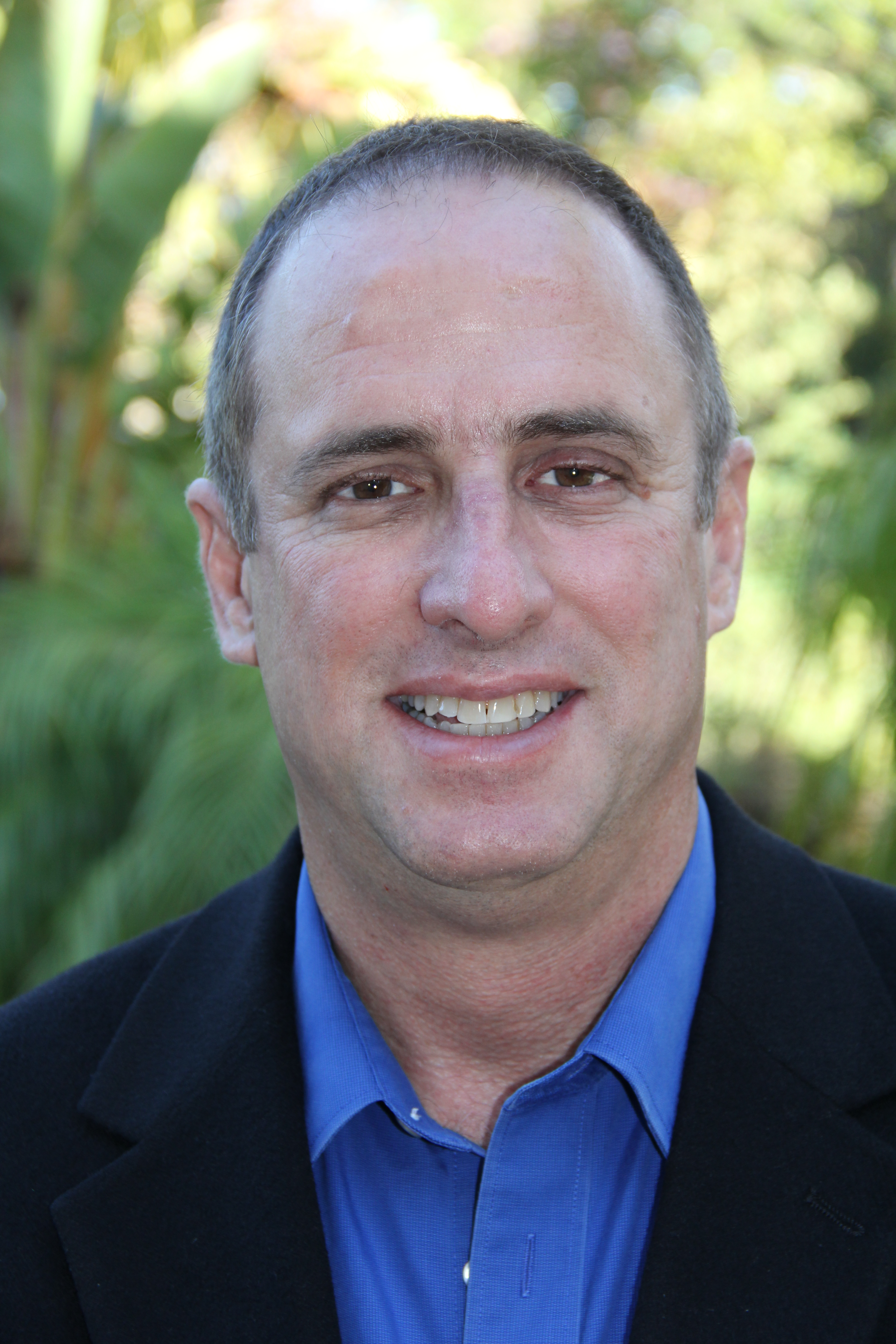
- Education: Bachelor of Music degree in Trumpet Performance, California State University, Northridge Master of Business Administration degree (M.B.A.), California State University, Northridge
- Employer(s): President & CEO of Surmani Business Coaching, Professor of Music Industry Studies and Academic Lead, Master of Arts in Music Industry Administration Degree, California State University, Northridge
- Board member of: Founding Board Member and Past President, Jazz Education Network Current Board Member, The Sessions Prior Advisory Board Member, Music Technology at Indiana University/Purdue University Indianapolis Prior Advisory Board Member, Technology through Music Education (TI:ME) Prior Editorial Board, College Music Society Founder and Past President of the MATES Foundation

Andrew Surmani is President and CEO of Surmani Business Coaching, LLCand Professor of Music Industry Studies/Academic Lead of the Master of Arts in Music Industry Administration program in the Mike Curb College of Arts, Media and Communication at California State University, Northridge (CSUN). Previously, he served as Chief Marketing Officer for Alfred Music, where he played a key role in the company's acquisition of Warner Brothers Publications, and launched numerous product lines.

== Education ==
Surmani has a Bachelor of Music degree in trumpet performance, and a Master of Business Administration degree from California State University, Northridge. While at CSUN, he played with the CSUN Wind Ensemble, Orchestra and Jazz "A" Band.

== Publications ==
Surmani has co-authored numerous books including the Alfred's Essentials of Music Theory series and Copyright Handbook for Music Educators and Directors, 2nd Edition. Alfred's Essentials of Music Theory is a multi-part multimedia program that teaches beginner and intermediate level music theory in individual and classroom settings. Surmani was also instrumental in the launch of Alfred Music's Sound Innovations series, the world's first customizable method for band and orchestra.

== Performances ==
As a musician, Surmani plays the trumpet and has toured throughout the US, Europe and Japan, and has performed in the Montreux Jazz Festival (Switzerland), Istanbul International Jazz Festival (Turkey), Jazz à Juan (Juan les Pins, France), Jazz à Vienne (Vienne, France), Umbria Jazz Festival (Italy), Wigan (England) and the Lake Biwa (Japan) jazz festivals. He has also performed in the concert halls of Carnegie Hall, David Geffen Hall and Alice Tully Hall at Lincoln Center for the Performing Arts, Fumon Hall in Tokyo, and the Dorothy Chandler Pavilion in Los Angeles.

He played lead trumpet in the Walt Disney World All-American College Jazz Band and in the California All-State Honor Band, the McDonald's All-American High School Marching Band and Jazz Band.

== Nonprofits ==
He was a founding board member and is a past president of the international education nonprofit Jazz Education Network (JEN).

Surmani currently serves on The Sessions Board. The Sessions provides the bridge between dreams and reality by Enriching artist lives through Education, focusing on Empowering and sharpening their business skills in the pursuit of excellence.

Surmani also served on the Music and Arts Technology Industry Advisory Board at Indiana University - Purdue University Indianapolis (IUPUI) and the Technology In Music Education (TI:ME) Advisory Board. He was the founder and past president of the MATES Foundation, a 501(c)(3) non-profit corporation formed to support a new arts and technology charter school in Thousand Oaks, California.

Surmani is a native of Oakland, California and Skyline_High_School_(Oakland,_California), and now resides in Los Angeles, California.
