= Oberlin Conservatory of Music =

Music school in Ohio, US

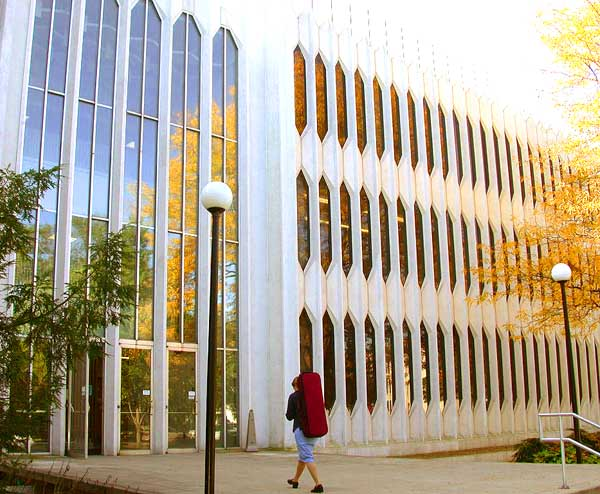
- Musician entering the Oberlin Conservatory
- Type: Private music conservatory
- Established: 1865
- Parent institution: Oberlin College
- Dean: William Quillen
- Faculty: 88
- Students: 615
- Location: Oberlin, Ohio, United States; 41°17′29″N 82°13′10″W
- Website: http://www.oberlin.edu/conservatory

The Oberlin Conservatory of Music is a private music conservatory of Oberlin College, a private liberal arts college in Oberlin, Ohio. It was founded in 1865 and is the second oldest conservatory and oldest continually operating conservatory in the United States. It is one of the few American conservatories to be completely attached to a liberal arts college, allowing students the opportunity to pursue degrees in both music and a traditional liberal arts subject via a five-year double-degree program. Like the rest of Oberlin College, the student body of the conservatory is almost exclusively undergraduate.

== History ==
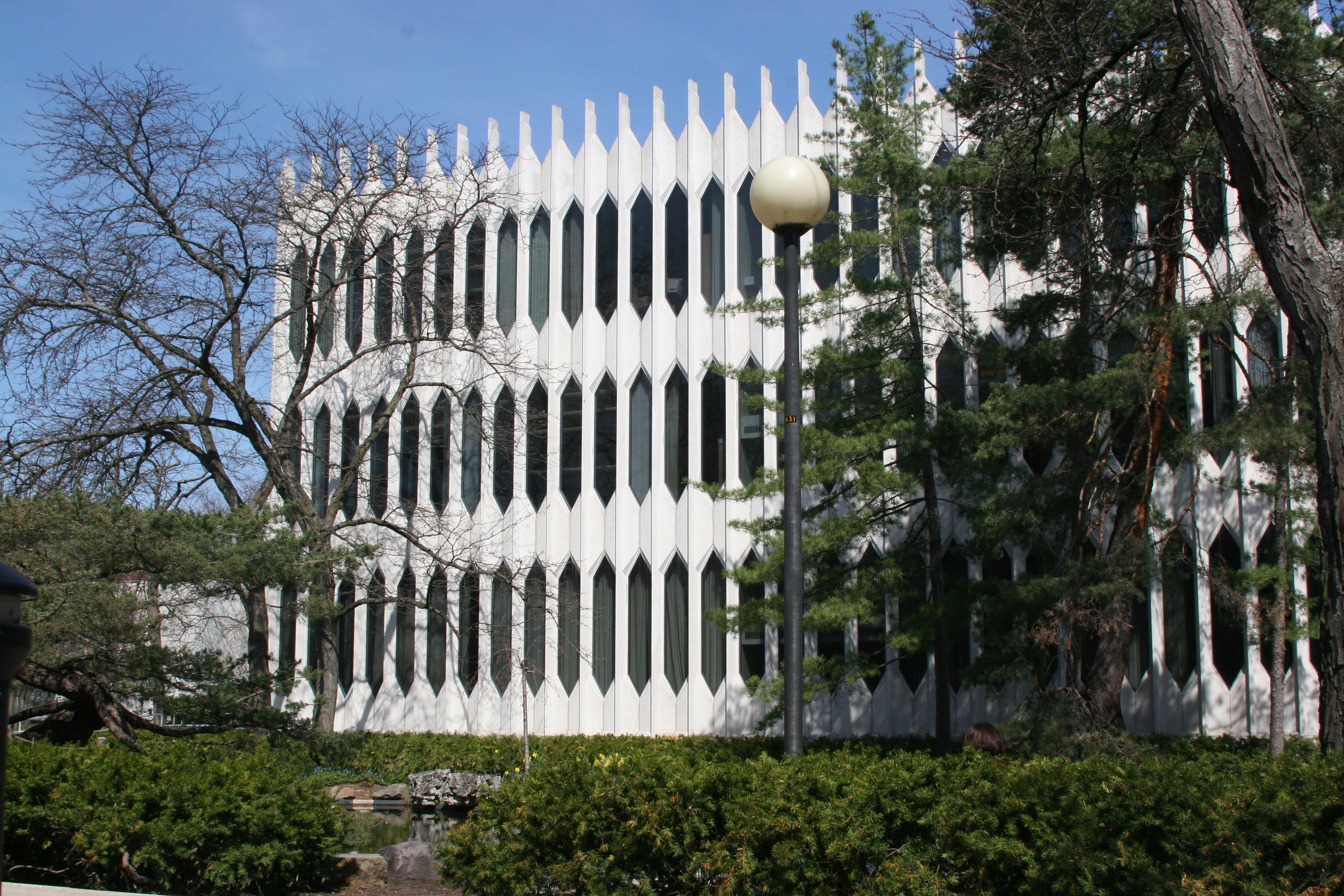
Bibbins Hall houses the conservatory's Classical Department and administration.

The Oberlin Collegiate Institute was built on 500 acres (2.0 km^{2}) of land, founded in 1833 and became Oberlin College in 1850. In 1867, two years after the Oberlin Conservatory's founding in 1865, the previously separate Oberlin Conservatory became incorporated with the college on a similar grant.

In tandem, the administration claimed that "Oberlin is peculiar in that which is good," notable as the first college and first conservatory in the United States to regularly admit African-American students. Oberlin College's role as an educator of African-American students prior to the Civil War and thereafter is historically significant. Notable is the graduation of William Grant Still, a student who widely became regarded as the "dean of African-American composers." These efforts have helped Oberlin remain committed to its values of freedom, social justice, and service.

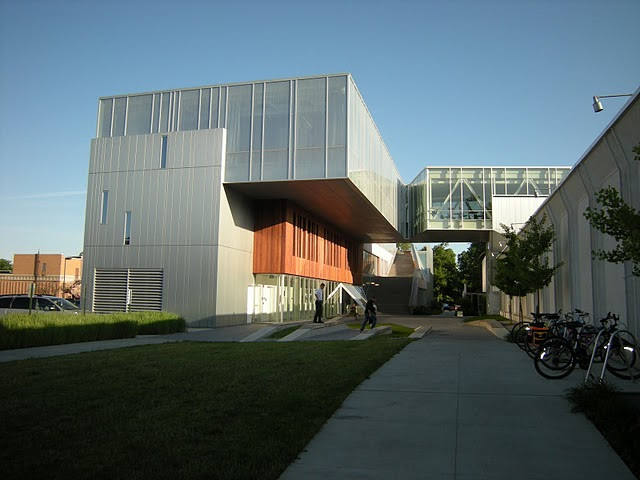
The Kohl Building, home of the Jazz and Musicology Departments, opened in 2010

It is also the oldest continuously operating coeducational conservatory, since its incorporation with Oberlin College, the first coeducational college. The college and conservatory were listed as a National Historic Landmark on December 21, 1965, for its significance in social progress.

Due to the conservatory's affiliation with Elisha Gray, inventor of the electromechanical oscillator, and Thaddeus Cahill, inventor of the telharmonium, Oberlin Conservatory plays a role in the origins of electronic music. The TIMARA (Technology In Music And Related Arts) program was the world's first conservatory program in this field, established in 1967.

Oberlin Conservatory was the recipient of the 2009 National Medal of Arts, the highest award given by the United States government to artists and arts patrons in recognition of the wealth and depth of their creative expressions. The Oberlin Conservatory of Music is the only professional music school to be so honored by President Barack Obama.

== Admissions ==
Due to the conservatory's affiliation with Oberlin College, students may either enter the conservatory only or Oberlin's five year Double-Degree program, in which the student will complete both a Bachelor of Music degree as well as a Bachelor of Arts. Admission is based primarily on an extremely competitive audition; over 1,400 musicians from around the world apply for a freshman class of around 120.

== Facilities ==
The conservatory was previously housed in Warner Hall, a large stone building where the King Building now stands. It now occupies four interconnected buildings on the south side of Tappan Square. The original structure of three big white buildings was designed by the Japanese-American architect Minoru Yamasaki in 1963, which closely resembles Yamasaki's later design of the World Trade Center in New York City. A vertical expansion was completed in 2010, improving the buildings acoustics and creating a double height recital room.

In 2010, The Bertram and Judith Kohl Building, designed by architectural firm DLR Group, opened to provide a new home for the Jazz Studies, Music History, and Music Theory departments. Kohl is connected to Robertson by a third-floor enclosed bridge, which also contains the Sky Bar, named for the iconic Cleveland jazz club that closed in 1954.

In 2025, the Conservatory East Studios, located on the side of the Hotel at Oberlin, opened to accommodate the conservatory's newly established Music Theater program, which launched that same year. The building houses a multitude of dance studios, faculty studios, and practice rooms. Additionally, the William and Helen Birenbaum Innovation and Performance Space, located in the lower level of the Hotel at Oberlin, is accessible through the internal connection between the hotel and the East Studios.

The Robertson Building houses around 150 practice rooms, most with windows. In addition, the Otto B. Schoepfle Vocal Arts Center, Career Resource Center, Kulas Organ Center, reed-making rooms, computer labs, faculty studios, and staff offices are located here.

Oberlin has been an all-Steinway school since 1877, and contains one of the largest collections of Steinway & Sons pianos in the world, consisting of over 240 pianos.

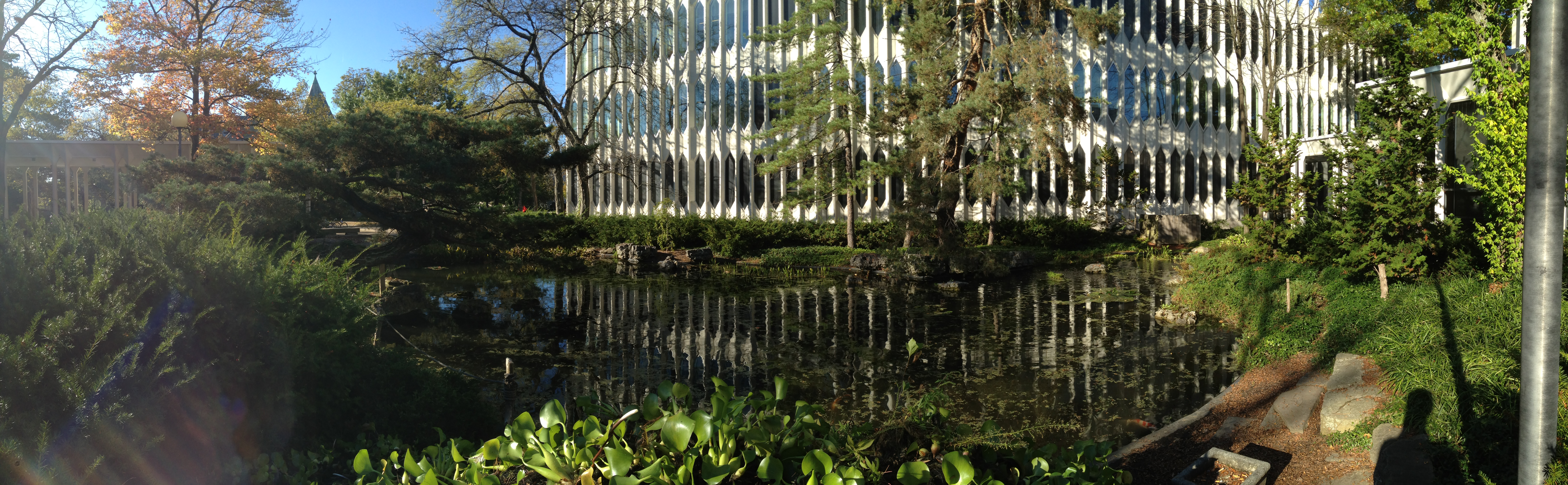
Panoramic view of the Conservatory Pond, the junction between Bibbins and Robertson.

== Academics ==
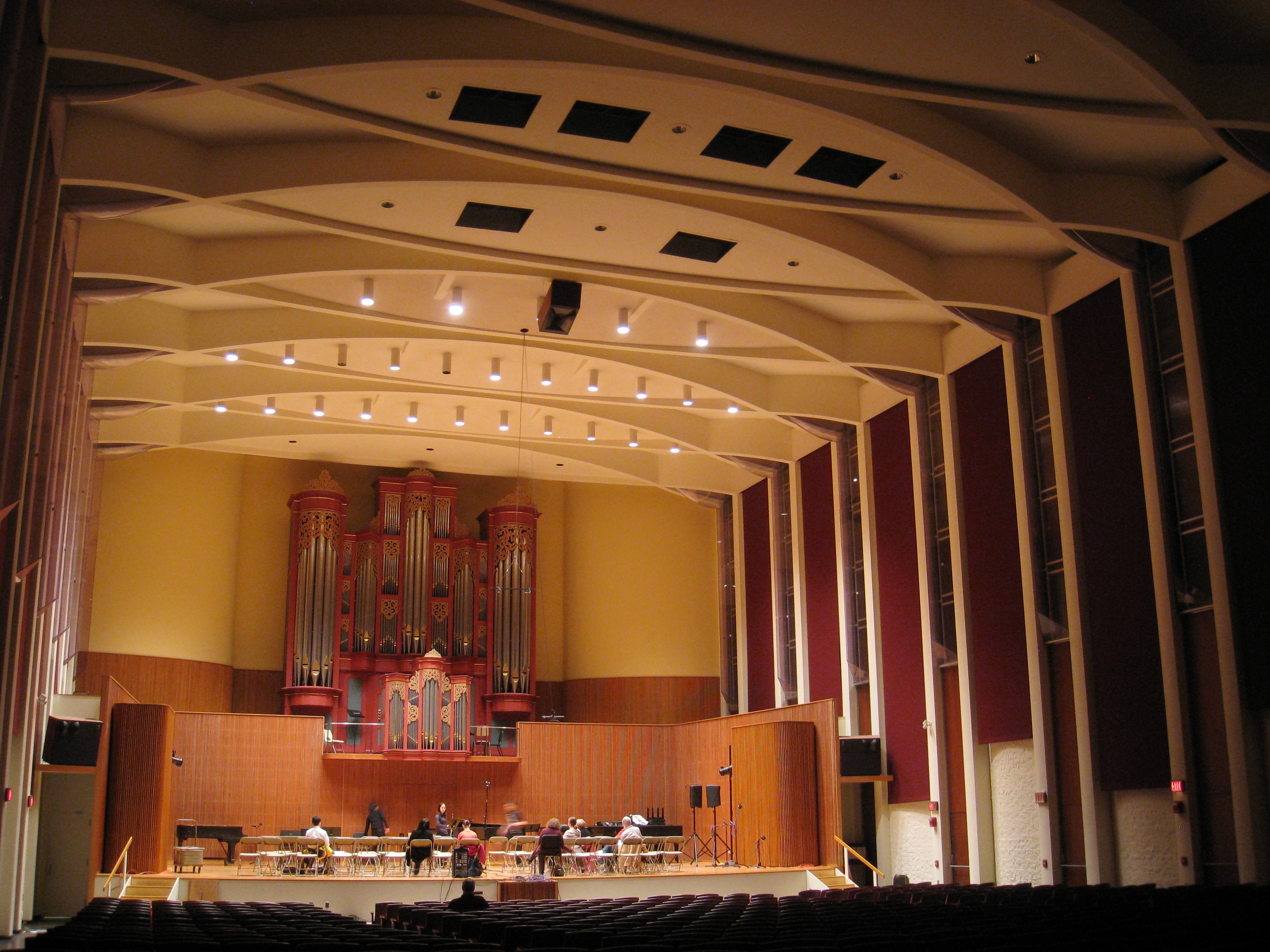
Warner Concert Hall

Oberlin Conservatory offers private study in 42 applied areas and undergraduate majors, including a double major in piano performance and vocal accompanying. It offers the Bachelor of Music, Master of Music, a performance diploma, and an artist diploma. Students accepted to both the College of Arts and Sciences and the Conservatory of Music pursue a degree in each division in the double-degree program.

These programs are organized into eleven divisions:

- Conducting and Ensembles
- Contemporary Music
- Historical Performance
- Jazz Studies
- Keyboard Studies
- Music Theater
- Music Theory
- Musicology
- Pedagogy, Advocacy, and Community Engagement
- Strings
- Vocal Studies
- Winds, Brass, and Percussion

== Oberlin Jazz Ensemble ==
The Oberlin Jazz Ensemble, composed of jazz as well as classical performance majors, is a component in a four-year curriculum in jazz studies, leading to a bachelor of music degree with a concentration in performance, composition, or both.

Wendell Logan, Professor of African-American Music and Chair of the Oberlin Jazz Studies Program, founded the Oberlin Jazz Ensemble in 1973.

Notable members of the Ensemble include:

- Ben Jaffe '93
- Chris Jonas '88
- Michael Mossman '82
- Chris Eldridge '04
- Peter Evans '03
- Sullivan Fortner '08
- Wilson Woods '24

== Notable people ==
Faculty

Alumni

See also

- List of Oberlin College and Conservatory people

== See also ==
- List of colleges and university schools of music in the USA
