= Department of Music at California State University, Northridge =

Coordinates: 33.78804°N 118.11160°W

Department of Music
- Mike Curb College of Arts, Media and Communication
- Type: Conservatory
- Parent institution: California State University, Northridge
- Director: Dr. John Roscigno
- Location: Los Angeles, California, United States
- Website: www.csun.edu/music
- Location in the Los Angeles metropolitan area

The Department of Music at California State University is a conservatory in Los Angeles, California. There are more than 500 students pursuing undergraduate and graduate degrees in music.

The Music Department at the California State University, Northridge offers studying and performing opportunities in connection with the leading educational institutions and cultural venues of the Los Angeles area.

== Faculty ==
- Gregg Bissonette, drums
- John Dearman, guitar
- Scott Glasgow, film and media composition
- Liviu Marinescu, composition
- Bob McChesney, jazz trombone
- John Pisano, jazz guitar
- Ron Purcell, guitar
- Andrew Surmani, music industry studies
- Steven Thachuk guitar

== Areas of study ==
Bachelor of Arts

- Music Industry Studies
- Music Therapy
- Breadth Studies in Music
- Music Education

Bachelor of Music

- Commercial & Media Composition
- Composition
- Strings
- Woodwinds
- Brass
- Percussion
- Piano
- Voice
- Jazz Performance
- Classical Guitar

Master of Arts

- Music education
- Music industry administration

Master of Music

- Conducting
- Composition
- Strings
- Woodwinds
- Brass
- Percussion
- Piano
- Organ
- Voice
- Classical Guitar

== Notable alumni ==
=== Brass ===
- Ronnie Blake trumpet
- Tony Clements tuba

=== Composition ===
- Beverly Grigsby composer
- Kentaro Sato Media and Commercial Music / Conducting (MA)
- George Stone (composer) composer
- Jeannie G. Pool composer
- Garrett Byrnes composer
- Stephen Cohn composer
- John Coda composer

=== Percussion ===
- Kalani percussion
- Alphonse Mouzon percussion

=== Piano ===
- Gordon Goodwin piano

=== Strings ===
- Ron Purcell classical guitar
- Robert Lipsett violin
- John Doan guitar
- Bruce Bransby bass

=== Voice ===
- Michelle DeYoung voice
- James Fortune voice
- Maia Sharp voice
- Nicole Cabell voice

=== Woodwinds ===
- Vicki Boeckman recorder, flute
- D. Scott Rogo oboe

=== Jazz ===
- Alphonso Johnson bass
- Kim Pensyl keyboard
- Richard Campbell bass guitar
- John Densmore jazz studies
- Michael Glenn Williams composer, pianist
- Masauko Chipembere Jr jazz studies

=== Other ===
- Toshiyuki Shimada conductor
- Paul Roessler singer
- Sebu Simonian singer-songwriter
- Leland Sklar singer, film composer
- James Lee Stanley singer-songwriter
- Tigran Arakelyan conductor
