= Néapolis (album) =

Studio album by Simple Minds
- Released: 16 March 1998
- Studio: Lochearn Studios, Scotland; Metropolis Studios, London, England; Studio Plus XXX, Paris, France; Home Studios, Dublin, Ireland; Capri Digital Studios, Capri, Italy
- Genre: Pop rock; synth-pop
- Length: 45:51
- Label: Chrysalis
- Producer: Charlie Burchill; Peter Walsh

Simple Minds chronology
The Promised (1997)	Néapolis (1998)	The Early Years 1977–1978 (1998)

Simple Minds studio albums chronology
Good News from the Next World (1995)	Néapolis (1998)	Our Secrets Are the Same (2000/2004)

Singles from Néapolis
- 1. "Glitterball" Released: 1998; 2. "War Babies" Released: 1998

Professional ratings
Review scores
Source	Rating
AllMusic	3/5 stars
Canoe.ca	3/5 stars
Q	3/5 stars
Vox	3/5 stars

Néapolis is the eleventh studio album (of original material) by Scottish rock band Simple Minds, released in March 1998 by record label Chrysalis.

== Background and content ==
After being released from their contract with Virgin Records, Simple Minds decided to musically reinvent themselves yet again. Having worked since 1991 as a duo with session musicians, Jim Kerr and Charlie Burchill reunited on a rehearsals-only basis with the band's original rhythm section, Derek Forbes and Brian McGee (returning after eleven & fourteen year absences respectively). McGee was not involved in the project beyond the rehearsal stage, but Forbes formally rejoined Simple Minds as bass guitar player in July 1996. To record the album, Simple Minds also reunited with producer Peter Walsh, who'd been responsible for their acclaimed 1982 New Gold Dream (81–82–83–84) album.

The resulting set of songs (written entirely by Kerr and Burchill) was a move away from the band's more recent stadium rock and funk approaches and a return to their early-'80s electronic pop days (inspired by European experimental pop such as Kraftwerk and Hansa-period David Bowie) as well as incorporating contemporary dance music influences. While the reinstated Forbes played all of the bass tracks, drums were handled either by session players Michael Niggs and Jim McDermott or replaced by programmed loops provided by Hamilton Lee of Transglobal Underground. In early 1997, the band brought in their former drummer Mel Gaynor for a studio session, resulting in him playing the drums on one track "War Babies". In a March 1998 interview with Q, Kerr would comment that Néapolis "wasn't created as some kind of spiritual successor [to New Gold Dream], but I suppose that in getting back together with the people we work best with, some kind of thematic similarity was inevitable."

== Release ==
Néapolis was released by Chrysalis Records in the UK, but charted poorly and received mixed reviews. Chrysalis refused to release the album in the US (citing lack of interest). The album produced two singles "Glitterball" and "War Babies", the former featuring a video which was the first production of any kind to film at the Guggenheim Museum in Bilbao, Spain. Videos for both singles were included on enhanced CD singles released for both tracks.

In early 1998, Gaynor was reinstated as a full-time member in time for live dates. With Mark Taylor as live keyboard player, the band toured Europe between March and July 1998 to support the new album, but the tour was dogged by band members' health problems and contractual fiascos (including a pull-out from the Fleadh Festival). The band parted company with Chrysalis Records after the tour. In 1999, recording sessions for a new Simple Minds album saw Gaynor and Forbes dropped from the band once again in favour of Mark Kerr and Eddie Duffy (although Gaynor would return to the band later).

== Reception ==
The album received mixed reviews. The NME's Jim Alexander lamented the effort, describing it as, "still the same windswept rock posturing wrapped up in slightly glitzier clothes." In a more positive review for AllMusic, Paul Fucito wrote, "It's nice to know that in the 1990s, one classic new wave band hasn't forgotten what it is all about."

== Track listing ==
All tracks are written by Jim Kerr and Charlie Burchill, except where noted.

No.	Title	Length
1.	"Song for the Tribes"	5:37
2.	"Glitterball"	4:55
3.	"War Babies"	5:03
4.	"Tears of a Guy"	4:48
5.	"Superman v Supersoul"	4:47
6.	"Lightning"	5:35
7.	"If I Had Wings"	4:43
8.	"Killing Andy Warhol"	5:16
9.	"Androgyny"	5:07
Total length:		45:51

Japanese edition bonus tracks
No.	Title	Writer(s)	Length
10.	"Don't You (Forget About Me)" (Jam & Spoon Remix)	Keith Forsey, Steve Schiff	7:56
11.	"Waterfront" (Union Jack Remix)	Kerr, Burchill, Mick MacNeil, Derek Forbes, Mel Gaynor	7:24

== Personnel ==
Adapted from the album's liner notes.

Simple Minds

- Jim Kerr – vocals
- Charlie Burchill – guitars, keyboards, programming
- Derek Forbes – bass guitar
- Mel Gaynor – drums on "War Babies"

Additional musicians

- Jim McDermott – additional drums
- Michael Niggs – additional drums
- Hamilton Lee – additional programming
- The Dukes – strings

Technical

- Charlie Burchill – producer
- Peter Walsh – producer, engineer, mixing
- Simple Minds – mixing
- Alessandro R.A. Benedetti – assistant engineer (Capri)
- Marco Della Monica – assistant engineer (Capri)
- Dougie Cowan – technical assistance
- Sandra Dods – coordination
- Toorkwaz – art direction, design
- Andy Earl – photography

== Charts ==
=== Weekly charts ===
Chart (1998)	Peak position
Hungarian Albums (MAHASZ)	30
