= David Becker =

American jazz guitarist (born 1961)

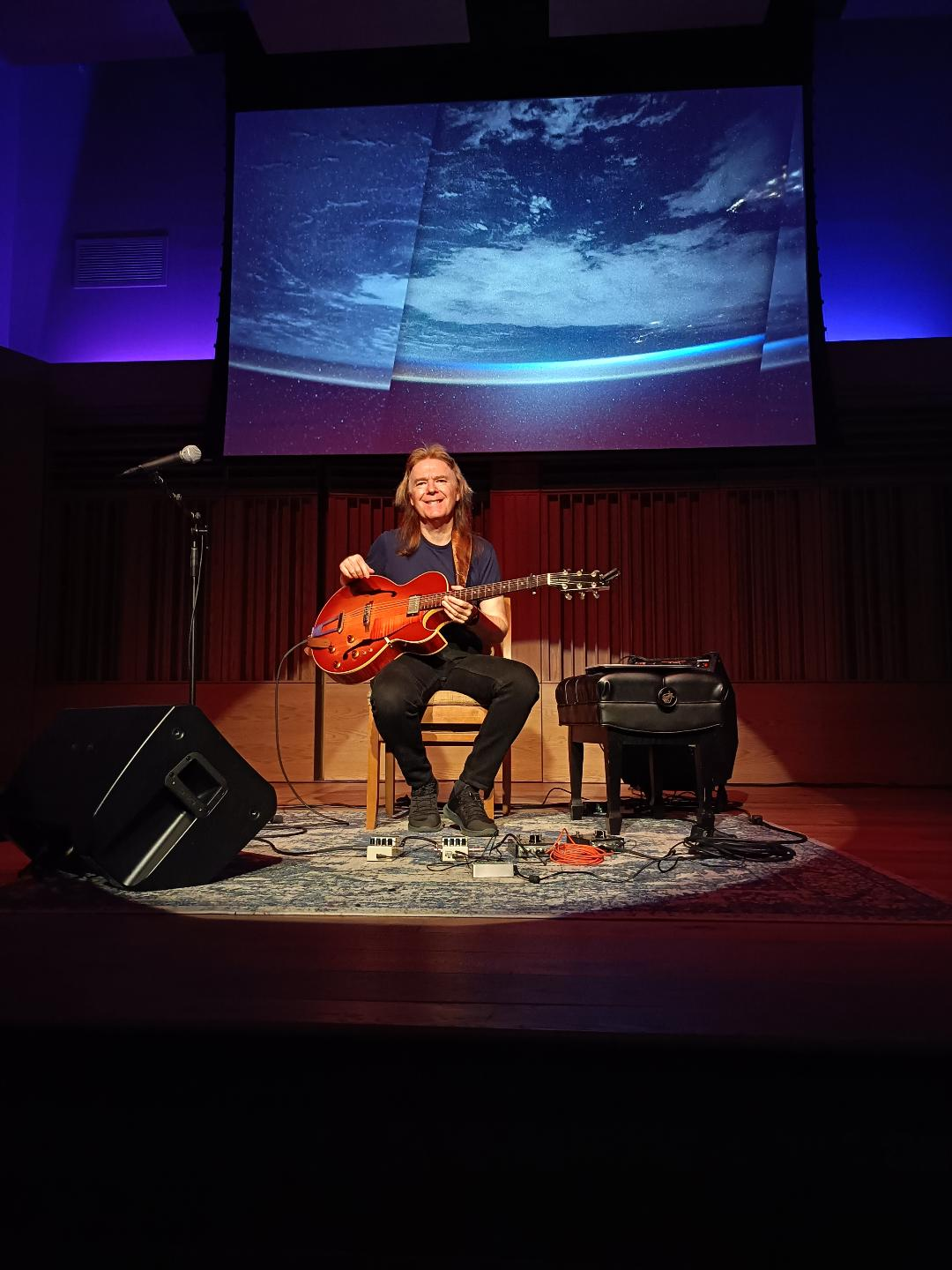
David Becker David Becker at Stages 2024
- Born: October 20, 1961; Cincinnati, Ohio, U.S.
- Genres: Jazz, jazz fusion
- Occupation: Musician
- Instrument: Guitar
- Years active: 1986–present
- Labels: MCA, Blue Moon
- Website: davidbeckertribune.com

David Becker (born October 20, 1961) is an American jazz guitarist and leader of the David Becker Tribune. He is also a graduate of the Musicians Institute.

== Biography ==
Becker began his musical life on the trumpet and won the "Outstanding Achievement Award" in music at Hale Jr High in Woodland Hills, CA under the direction of Ted Dechter who was the grandfather of Jazz guitarist, Graham Dechter. He took up guitar at age 15. David also had a brief acting career appearing in several national TV commercials with actors such as Eddie Albert.

== Career ==
David and his brother Bruce (drummer) formed the David Becker Tribune in 1982. In 1984, they recorded a self titled EP at Warner Brothers studios and then toured Germany. After touring the US colleges for four months that same year, the band signed with MCA and released its debut album Long Peter Madsen in 1986. The album was recorded and mixed by Grammy winning engineer Chet Himes (Christopher Cross) In 1988, Siberian Express (MCA), produced with Ken Caillat was released and reached No. 3 on R&R and the track "Anja" reached No. 1. This was followed in 1990 and 1991 by two albums, Third Time Around and In Motion.

In 2001, the band released one of the first DVD-Audio recordings, Germerica. Some of the tracks were co-produced by drummer Mark Schulman. In 2004, Where's Henning reached No. 34 on the JazzWeek chart. A solo album, Euroland, and a duo with jazz guitarist Joe Diorio, The Color of Sound (Acoustic Music), followed in 2005.

Batavia was released world wide on August 6, 2010, to coincide with the 65th anniversary of the dropping of the atom bomb in Japan. The compositions were influenced by Becker's mother's family in Indonesia and their internment in a Japanese concentration camp during World War II. Batavia was voted one of the Best World Music recordings of 2010 by World Music Central.org. In 2013 Distance Traveled was released and reached No. 18 on the CMJ charts. In July 2015, Becker released the solo album The Lonely Road (Acoustic Music Records). In 2018, Becker recorded a duo outing with former Ray Charles guitarist, Brad Rabuchin as a tribute to the late guitarist John Abercrombie. For John was released in June 2019. A new book of 25 Guitar Etudes penned by Becker, Etudes You Can Use, was released in March 2021. In August 2021, Becker joined drummer Chris Bowman (Ornette Coleman) and bassist Jim Donica (Maynard Ferguson) to record an improvised set of music. The album, Continuum was released August 7, 2022.

Becker also released a new solo recording, Planets in October 2022. In August 2024, Becker released Gravitationally Bound, which was recorded in Immersive Sound by Ken Caillat and Claus Trelby. Becker also appeared on the cover of the October 2024 issue Jazz Guitar Today.

Tuxedo Man is the name of a new album by David Becker and drummer Paul Wertico, released on August 15th. The album features a collection of mostly improvised tracks.

On May 11, 2026, David Becker released, Carroll's Crater written for the Artemis II mission and the crater named after the late wife of commander Reid Wiseman. The song was produced with Grammy winning producer, Ken Caillat.

== Other projects ==
At the January 2015 NAMM Show, Heritage Guitars unveiled the David Becker H- 575 Signature model.

Becker also appears on the Colbie Caillat album, Breakthrough as well as her album All of You. He produced an Attila Zoller tribute album released by Enja in 2015. The album includes Ron Carter, Pat Metheny, Mike Stern, and John Abercrombie. In September 2019, Becker appeared in a podcast together with Country legend Vince Gill.

== Personal life ==
Becker and his wife, Laurie (née Friday) reside in Central Illinois.

== Discography ==
- David Becker Tribune EP (Warner, 1984)
- Long Peter Madsen (MCA, 1986)
- Siberian Express (MCA, 1988)
- Third Time Around (Bluemoon, 1990)
- In Motion (Bluemoon, 1991)
- Nevsky Prospekt (Pinorrekk, 1995)
- Germerica (Silverline, 2001)
- Where's Henning? (Paras, 2004)
- Euroland (Cool Springs, 2005)
- The Color of Sound(Acoustic Music, 2005)
- Leaving Argentina (Acoustic Music, 2007)
- Batavia (Acoustic Music, 2010)
- Distance Traveled (Acoustic Music, 2013)
- The Lonely Road (Acoustic Music, 2015)
- Message to Attila (Enja, 2015)
- Sounds of the World (Wonderland, 2015)
- Kiwi Dreams (Acoustic Music, 2018)
- For John (Manasus Music, 2019)
- Continuum (Acoustic Music, 2022)
- Planets (Acoustic Music, 2022)
- Gravitationally Bound (ArtistMax, 2024)
- Tuxedo Man (New Sun, 2025)

== Books/DVDs ==
- 2005: Getting Your Improvising Into Shape (Mel Bay)
- 2010: Playing in Shapes (Fingerprint)
- 2013: Rhythmic Motifs for Comping and Soloing (Fingerprint)
- 2015: Transitions to Jazz (Truefire)
- 2021: Etudes You Can Use (DBT)
