= The Promised =

Compilation album by Simple Minds
- Released: 29 September 1997
- Recorded: 1981–1995
- Genre: Rock
- Label: Virgin

Simple Minds chronology
Good News from the Next World (1995)	The Promised (1997)	Néapolis (1998)

The Promised (subtitled Night of the Proms Special Edition) is a Simple Minds compilation album released in 1997 by Virgin Records.

The track selection of the album is similar to the group's former compilation Glittering Prize 81/92. It omits "Love Song", "All the Things She Said", and "Ghost Dancing" but includes "New Gold Dream (81–82–83–84)" and their two most recent singles from Good News from the Next World which was their final album for Virgin Records.

== Track listing ==
1. "Belfast Child" (1989) – 6:40
2. "Don't You (Forget About Me)" (single version) – 4:20
3. "Alive and Kicking" (single version) – 4:45
4. "Someone Somewhere in Summertime" – 4:37
5. "New Gold Dream (81–82–83–84)" – 5:40
6. "Sanctify Yourself" (single version) – 3:55
7. "See the Lights" (1991) – 4:22
8. "Waterfront" – 4:49
9. "The American" (single edit) – 3:32
10. "She's a River" (1995) – 5:29
11. "Hypnotised" (1995) – 5:50
12. "Promised You a Miracle" (single edit) – 3:59
13. "Speed Your Love to Me" – 4:25
14. "Glittering Prize" (single edit) – 3:58
15. "Let There Be Love" (1991) (single version) – 4:44
16. "Mandela Day" (1989) – 5:40

== Charts ==
=== Weekly charts ===
Chart (1997)	Peak position
Belgian Albums (Ultratop Flanders)	12
Belgian Albums (Ultratop Wallonia)	18
Dutch Albums (Album Top 100)	45
German Albums (Offizielle Top 100)	97

=== Year-end charts ===
Chart (1997)	Position
Belgian Albums (Ultratop Flanders)	36
Chart (1998)	Position
Belgian Albums (Ultratop Flanders)	78

== Certifications ==
Region	Certification	Certified units/sales
Belgium (BRMA)	Gold	25,000^{*}
^{*} Sales figures based on certification alone.
