= In Motion (David Becker Tribune album) =

Studio album by David Becker Tribune
- Released: 1991
- Studio: Castle Oaks Studios, Calabasas, California; Kludgit Sound, Cerrillos, New Mexico
- Genre: Jazz, jazz fusion
- Length: 51:16
- Label: Blue Moon
- Producer: David Becker, Bruce Becker, Micajah Ryan

David Becker Tribune chronology
Third Time Around (1990)	In Motion (1991)	Nevsky Prospekt (1995)

In Motion is an album by the David Becker Tribune released in 1991.

== Track listing ==
All writing by David Becker except where indicated

1. "Wesward Ho"
2. "Intro"
3. "In Motion"
4. "Outta Towner"
5. "Forgotten Friends"
6. "Time Has Fun (When You're Flying By)" (David Becker, Tom Lilly)
7. "Pepé"
8. "From the Right Side"
9. "Cobalt Blue (David Becker, Bruce Becker)
10. "Passion Dance" (McCoy Tyner)
11. "Just Because"

== Personnel ==
- David Becker – acoustic electric guitars, keyboards
- T Lavitz – piano
- Tom Lilly – fretless bass, keyboards
- Bruce Becker – drums, percussion
- Brad Dutz – percussion
