= Siberian Express (album) =

Studio album by David Becker Tribune
- Released: 1988
- Studio: Castle Oaks Studio, Calabasas, California
- Genre: Jazz
- Length: 44:59
- Label: MCA
- Producer: Ken Caillat, David Becker, Bruce Becker

David Becker Tribune chronology
Long Peter Madsen (1986)	Siberian Express (1988)	Third Time Around (1991)

Siberian Express is an album by American jazz group David Becker Tribune, released in 1988.

== Background ==
Siberian Express reached No. 3 on the R&R charts.

== Track listing ==
All writing by David Becker except where indicated

1. "Anja"
2. "Hilversum"
3. "Siberian Express"
4. "Central Park West" (John Coltrane)
5. "Red Mogambo"
6. "Dance of the Candy Cats"
7. "Taps"
8. "Waiting for Chet"
9. "Land of Floren"
10. "Reflections"

== Personnel ==
- David Becker – acoustic and electric guitars, synthesizer
- Jim Donica – double bass, bass guitar
- Bruce Becker – drums, percussion

Guests

- Jimmy Johnson – bass
- Vinnie Colaiuta – drums
- Brian Kilgore – percussion
