= Steven Thachuk =

American musician and educator

- Born: Toronto, Ontario, Canada
- Genres: Classical guitar
- Occupation: Guitarist
- Instrument: Guitar
- Website: www.steventhachuk.com

Steven Thachuk is a classical and fingerstyle guitarist. Born in Toronto, Ontario, Canada, he has been head of classical guitar studies at California State University Northridge, United States, since 2002.

== Discography ==
- Evocacion (2002) - The Meyer-Thachuk Guitar Duo
- Currents (2004)
