= Third Time Around =

Studio album by David Becker Tribune
- Released: 1990
- Studio: Avatar Studios, Malibu, California
- Genre: Jazz, jazz fusion
- Length: 46:27
- Label: Blue Moon
- Producer: David Becker, Bruce Becker, Ken Caillat

David Becker Tribune chronology
| Siberian Express (1988) | Third Time Around (1990) | In Motion (1991) |

Professional ratings
Review scores
| Source | Rating |
|---|---|
| Allmusic | 4/5 stars |

Third Time Around is an album by American jazz group David Becker Tribune, released in 1990.

== Background ==
At AllMusic, critic Alex Henderson gave the album four out of five stars and complimented the band's accessible, melodic fusion of rock and jazz.

== Track listing ==
All writing by David Becker except where indicated

1. "Rios" (David Becker, Bruce Becker)
2. "Ensenada"
3. "Drivin' Home" (David Becker, Bob Mair)
4. "Farewell"
5. "Be Right Back"
6. "Denpasar" (David Becker, Bruce Becker, Bob Mair)
7. "Wallofguitar"
8. "Song for J.B."
9. "With You in Mine"

== Personnel ==
- David Becker – acoustic electric guitars, keyboards
- Bob Mair – fretless bass, keyboards
- Bruce Becker – drums, percussion
- Gary Gardner – percussion
- Richie Gajate-Garcia – percussion
