= Long Peter Madsen =

Studio album by David Becker Tribune
- Released: 1986
- Recorded: July 1985
- Studio: Amigo Studio, North Hollywood, California
- Genre: Jazz
- Length: 45:29
- Label: MCA
- Producer: David Becker, Bruce Becker

David Becker Tribune chronology
Long Peter Madsen (1986)	Siberian Express (1990)

Long Peter Madsen is the debut album by the American jazz group David Becker Tribune, released in 1986.

== Track listing ==
All tracks are written by David Becker except where noted.

No.	Title	Length
1.	"Long Peter Madsen"	5:14
2.	"Pepe"	6:20
3.	"(Struttin' Down) Hollywood Blvd."	4:30
4.	"Bop du Bu Bop"	7:17
5.	"Days of Wine and Roses" (Henry Mancini)	8:11
6.	"Reconnaissance"	6:01
7.	"Nazareth"	2:12
8.	"Pictures of the Past"	5:15

== Personnel ==
- David Becker – guitar, keyboards
- Jim Donica – double bass, bass guitar
- Bruce Becker – drums, percussion
