= DRUMscene =

Australian magazine for drummers

- Categories: Music
- Frequency: Quarterly
- Publisher: DrumTek
- Founder: Frank Corniola
- First issue: June 1995
- Country: Australia
- Based in: Melbourne, Victoria
- Language: English
- Website: www.drumscene.com.au

DRUMscene is an Australian magazine focused on drumming. The magazine was founded by Frank Corniola in 1995 and is published by DrumTek. Alongside DRUMscene, the group also publishes PERCUSscene, a magazine dedicated towards general percussion, on an infrequent basis.

In addition to its publication, DRUMscene has also held several festivals featuring top drummers such as Jojo Mayer and Todd Sucherman.
