= Jazz à Vienne =

Jazz festival in Vienne, France

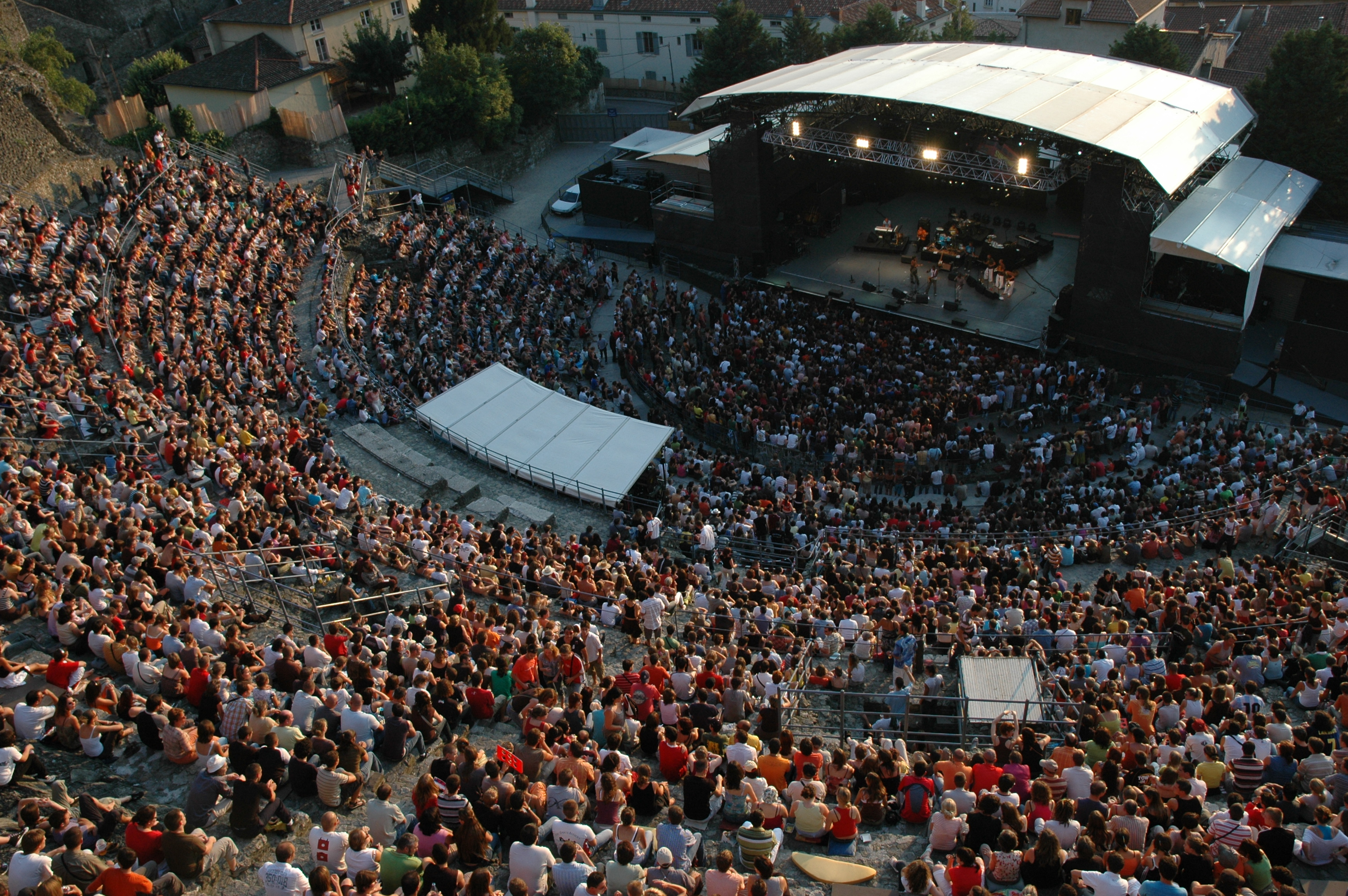
- Vienne antique theatre during a Jazz à Vienne concert
- Genre: Jazz, soul, hip-hop, Afrobeat, etc.
- Dates: end of June, often until 13 July
- Location: Vienne
- Years active: 6 July 1981 - present
- Founders: Pierre Domeyne, Jean-Paul Boutellier, Jean Gueffier
- Website: jazzavienne.com//

Jazz à Vienne is a jazz festival in Vienne, Isère, near Lyon, France.

The festival has been held since 6 July 1981 in the months of June and July for two weeks. Every evening during the festival, there are concerts in the ancient Roman theater of Vienne. Among the performers there have been musicians such as Miles Davis, Stan Getz, Michel Petrucciani, Ella Fitzgerald, Sonny Rollins, Lionel Hampton, Dee Dee Bridgewater, Chuck Berry, Ike Turner, Céline Bonacina, Joe Zawinul, Vulfpeck, and Brad Mehldau. Many musicians have returned, like Herbie Hancock who has already performed more than a dozen times in Vienne. In addition to the main concerts there are smaller concerts on other stages in the city, as well as concerts in pubs and musical moves.

== See also ==
- List of jazz festivals
