= Mark Schulman =

American musician and corporate speaker (born 1961)

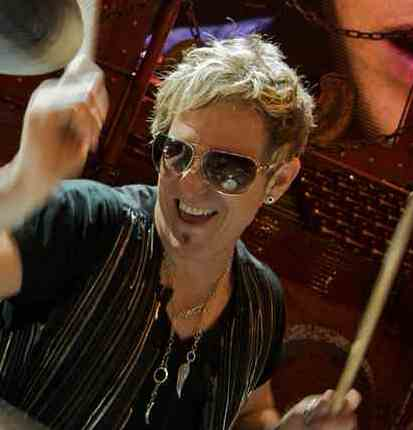
- Schulman in 2014

Background information
- Born: September 4, 1961 (age 65); Los Angeles, California, United States
- Genres: Pop; rock; funk; jazz fusion; R&B
- Occupations: Musician; speaker; music producer; composer; engineer; studio owner
- Instrument: Drums
- Years active: 1986–present
- Website: markschulman.com

Mark Schulman (born September 4, 1961, in Los Angeles, California) is an American musician, music producer, audio engineer and corporate speaker who has performed with Foreigner, Pink and Cher as their tour drummer for more than 30 years. Schulman is also a session drummer and co-owner of West Triad Studios, a recording venue located in Venice, California. Schulman is also a virtual and on-stage motivational speaker and published author.

== Childhood and education ==
Schulman was born to two college English professors, both of Jewish heritage and raised as a reform Jew. In a 2012 interview, he explained that by age 3, after seeing the Beatles perform on The Ed Sullivan Show, he knew he wanted to be a professional drummer and musician.

Prior to taking up drums, Schulman began on cello and is a classically trained cellist. As a teen, he played cello with the Los Angeles Junior Philharmonic. He was a childhood friend of Grammy-nominated guitarist David Becker.

== Early career ==
Breaking into the professional music scene, in 1988 Schulman was the touring drummer for Brenda Russell doing a world tour opening up for Billy Ocean. Schulman continued to work with many Smooth Jazz artists including Dave Koz and Bobby Caldwell and branching into large rock tours with Richard Marx, Foreigner and Simple Minds playing on their album Good News from the Next World. Schulman has toured and recorded with international artists such as Udo Lindenberg and Japanese Rock Star Eikichi Yazawa. From 1993 to 2001, Schulman was the touring drummer for Billy Idol.

== Touring with Pink and Cher ==
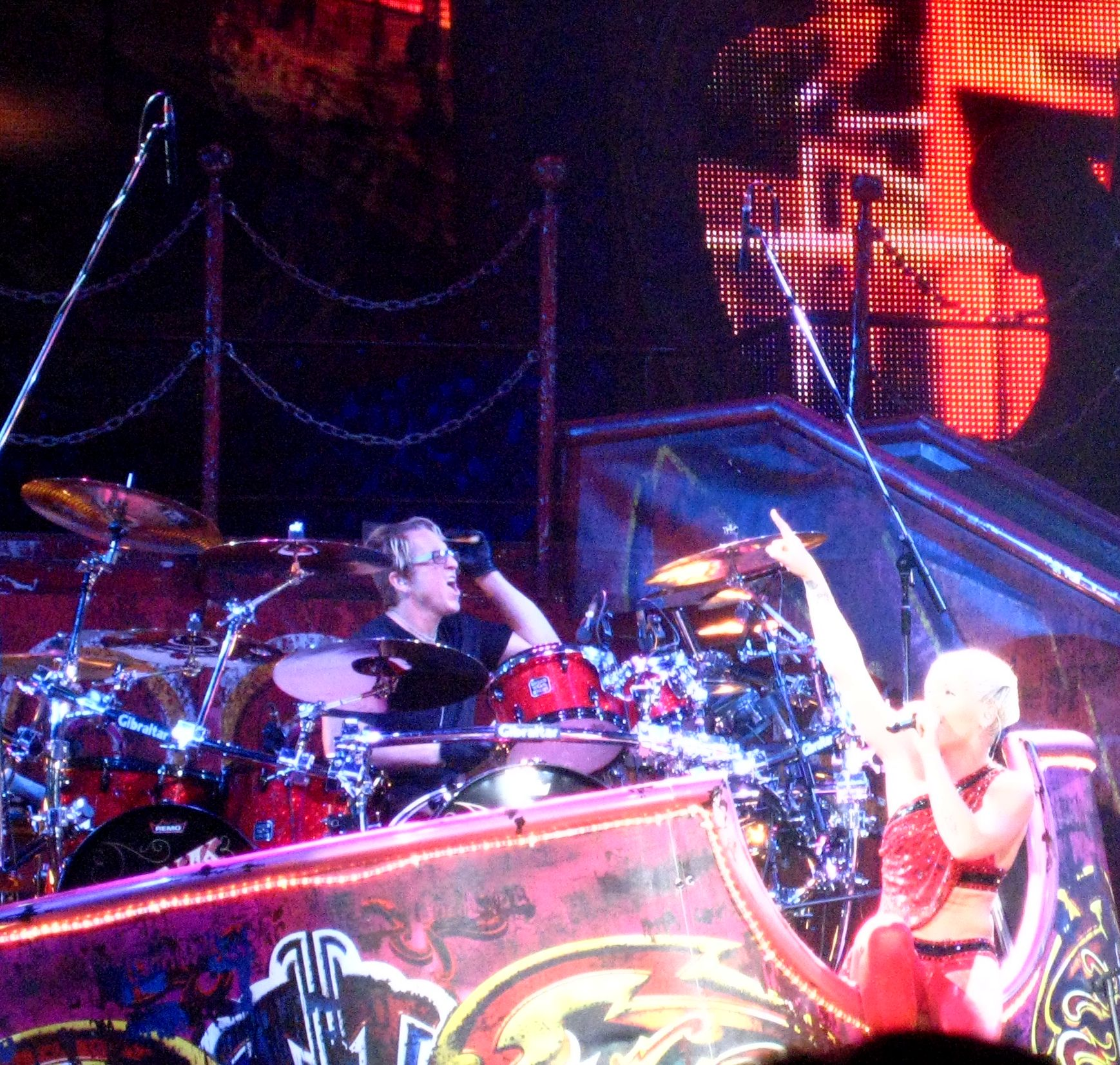
Touring with Pink in 2009

From 2006 to 2021, Schulman was the touring drummer for international singer and performer, Pink. Schulman also did numerous tours with Cher from 1999 through 2017.

== Interviews ==
In August 2013, Schulman gave an interview for German magazine, Sticks.

In 2014, Schulman was interviewed by Fortune Magazine's Robert Hackett in an article called, 'How to Survive Touring with Superstars"

In a 2021 interview with Chris Cohen in "Bands to Fans", Schulman said, "I look at my job as being of service. I'm in the service industry... When I get on stage, I'm there to be of service to Pink, to the band, to the audience, to the crew. My nickname Pink gave me years ago is 'Disneyland: The happiest place on earth.' One of the things that drew her to me, in addition to my playing, was my ability to just be a light beam and bring that positivity.

== Featured in magazines for drummers ==
During his career as a musician, Schulman was featured in numerous drummer's magazines. He made the cover of Modern Drummer Magazine's May 2019 issue and was featured in an article, "Mark Schulman – Lifting the Vibe".

Schulman was voted One of the Top 3 Pop rock Drummers in the "Modern Drummer Reader's Poll" in 2014.

Artist Pink described Schulman in the May 2019 issue of Modern Drummer, artist, saying, "Mark has been a special part of my band for twelve-plus years"

== Equipment endorsements ==
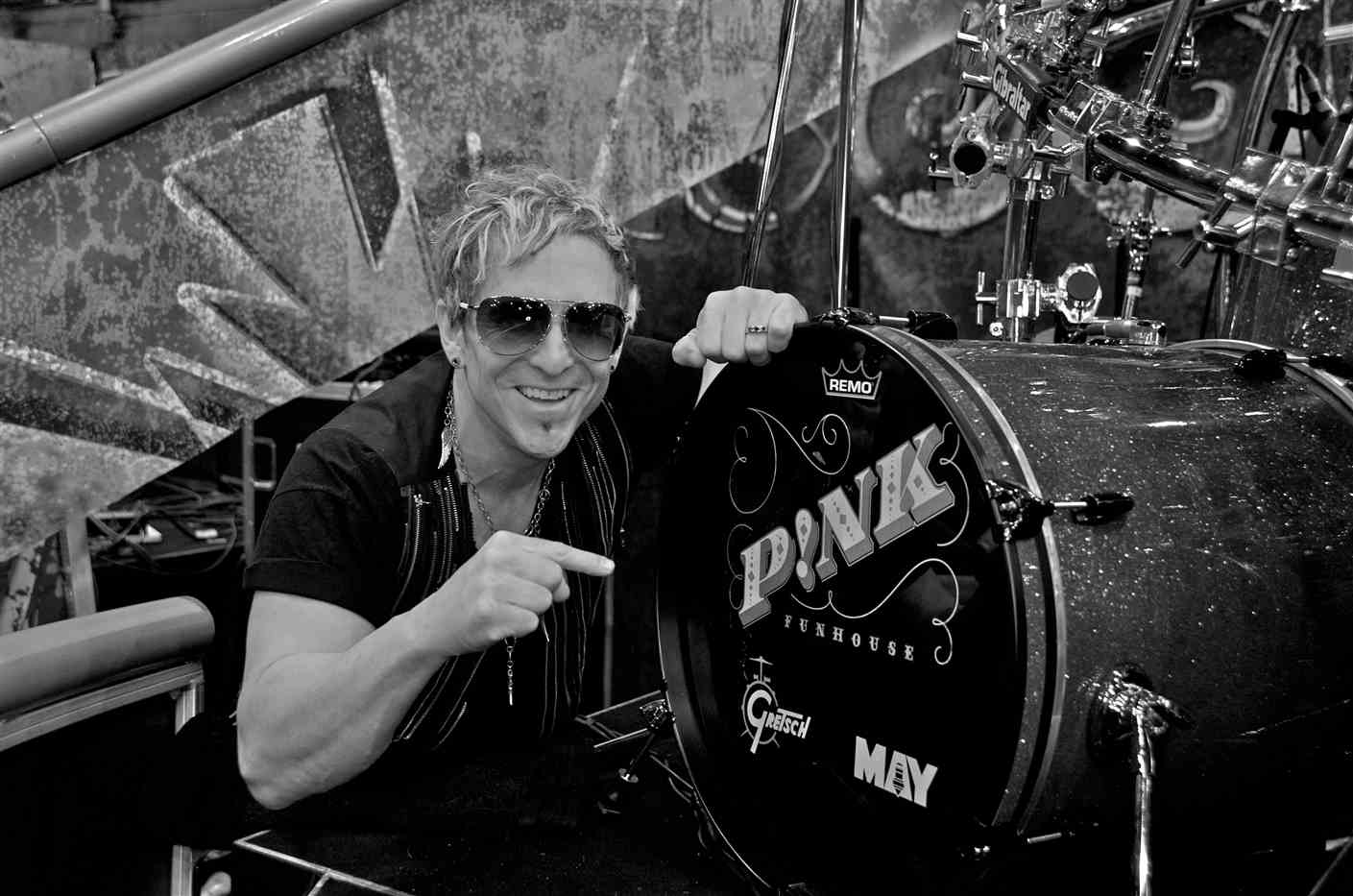
Schulman in 2014

Schulman has been an official endorser of various musical instruments including Gretsch drums, Sabian cymbals, Vic Firth drumsticks, Remo drum heads, Toca percussion, and Sennheiser microphones.

== Other projects ==
In 2010, Schulman was the founder, co-owner, audio engineer, and music producer of West Triad Studios in Venice, California.

== Recent projects ==
In 2022, Schulman retired as a drummer with Pink's band to work full time on his own business becoming a virtual and on-stage motivational keynote speaker. Recently with his partner and neurocoach, Heather Crider they created the program EVERYDAY ROCKSTAR which highlights the intersection of rock n roll and simple neuroscience. Schulman has delivered over 2,000 keynote performances for Fortune 500 clients including Microsoft, Dell, IBM, McDonalds, Re/Max, Prudential and a plethora of associations.

== Writing projects ==
Schulman is the author of two books, Conquering Life's Stage Fright: Three Steps to Top Performance and The Attitude Equation which he co-wrote with Dr. Jim Samuels
