= Umbria Jazz Festival =

Annual jazz festival in Perugia, Italy

Coordinates: 43.1167°N 12.3833°E

The Umbria Jazz Festival, directed by Carlo Pagnetta, is one of the most important jazz festivals in the world and has been held annually since 1973. Today, the summer festival runs for 10 days in Perugia, capital of Umbria. The original plan was to hold events throughout the region of Umbria and indeed the Umbria Jazz Winter Festival takes place annually in December/January in Orvieto.

== Artists who have performed at Umbria Jazz ==
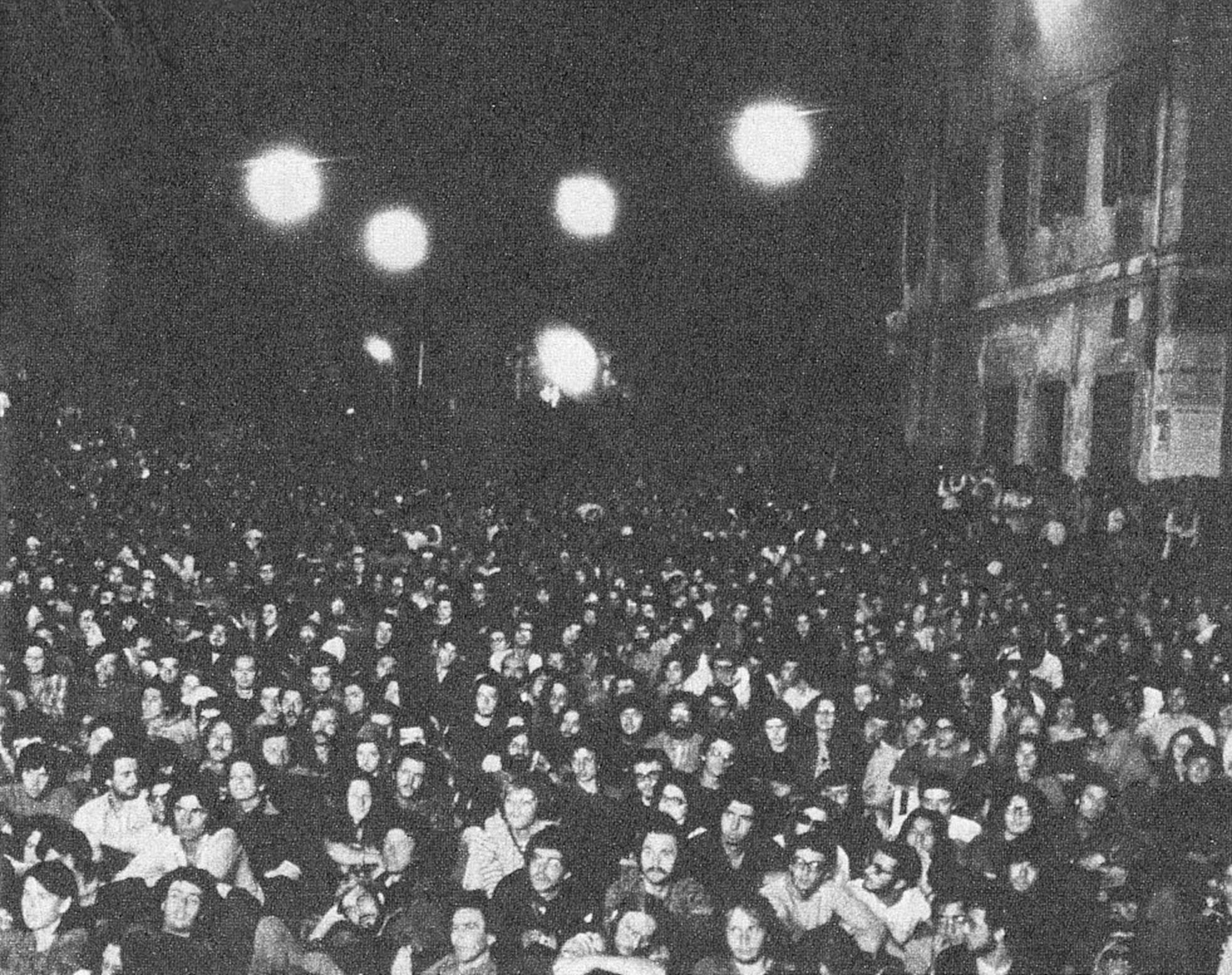
A live concert at Umbria Jazz 1975

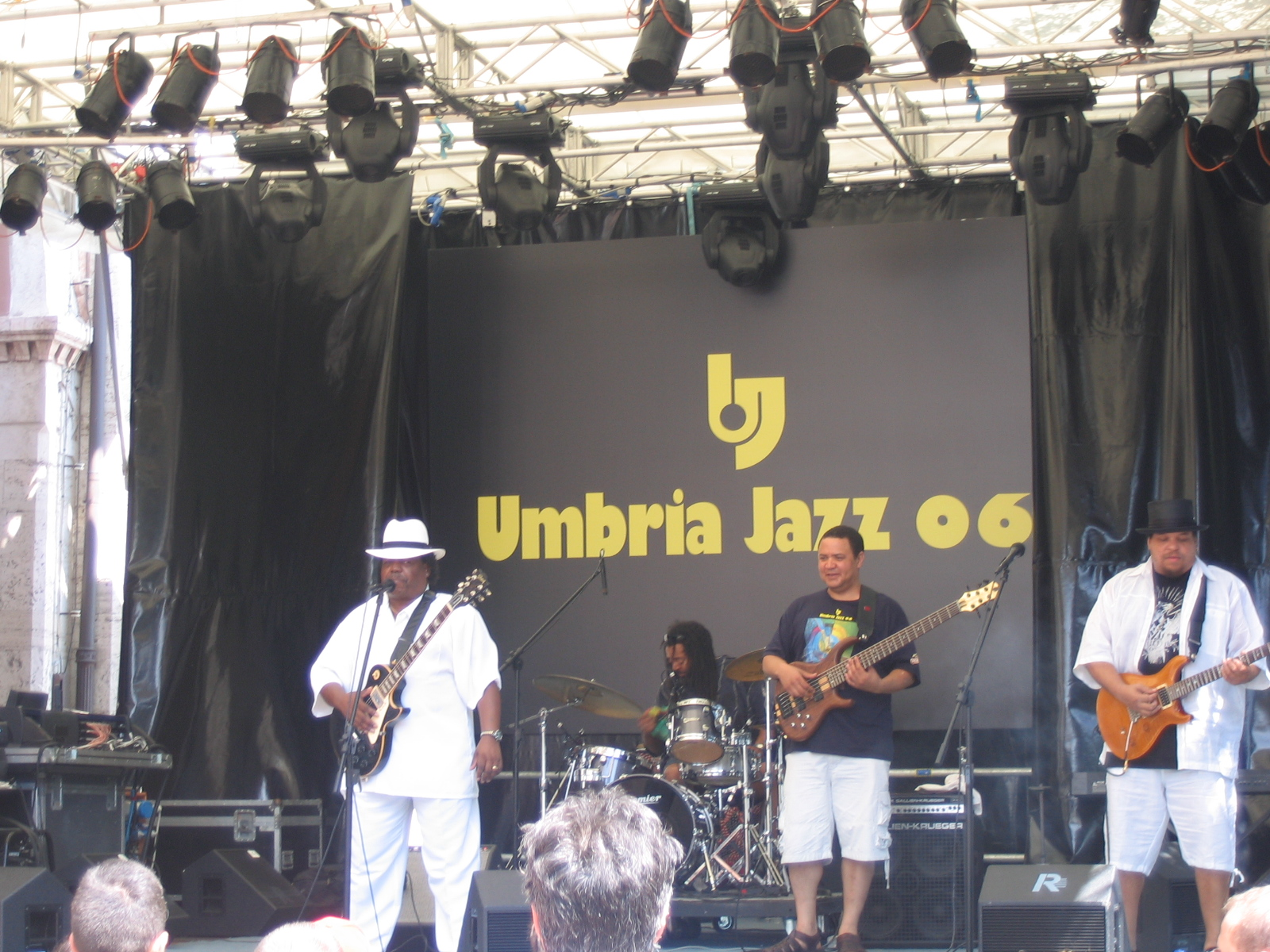
A live concert at Umbria Jazz 2006

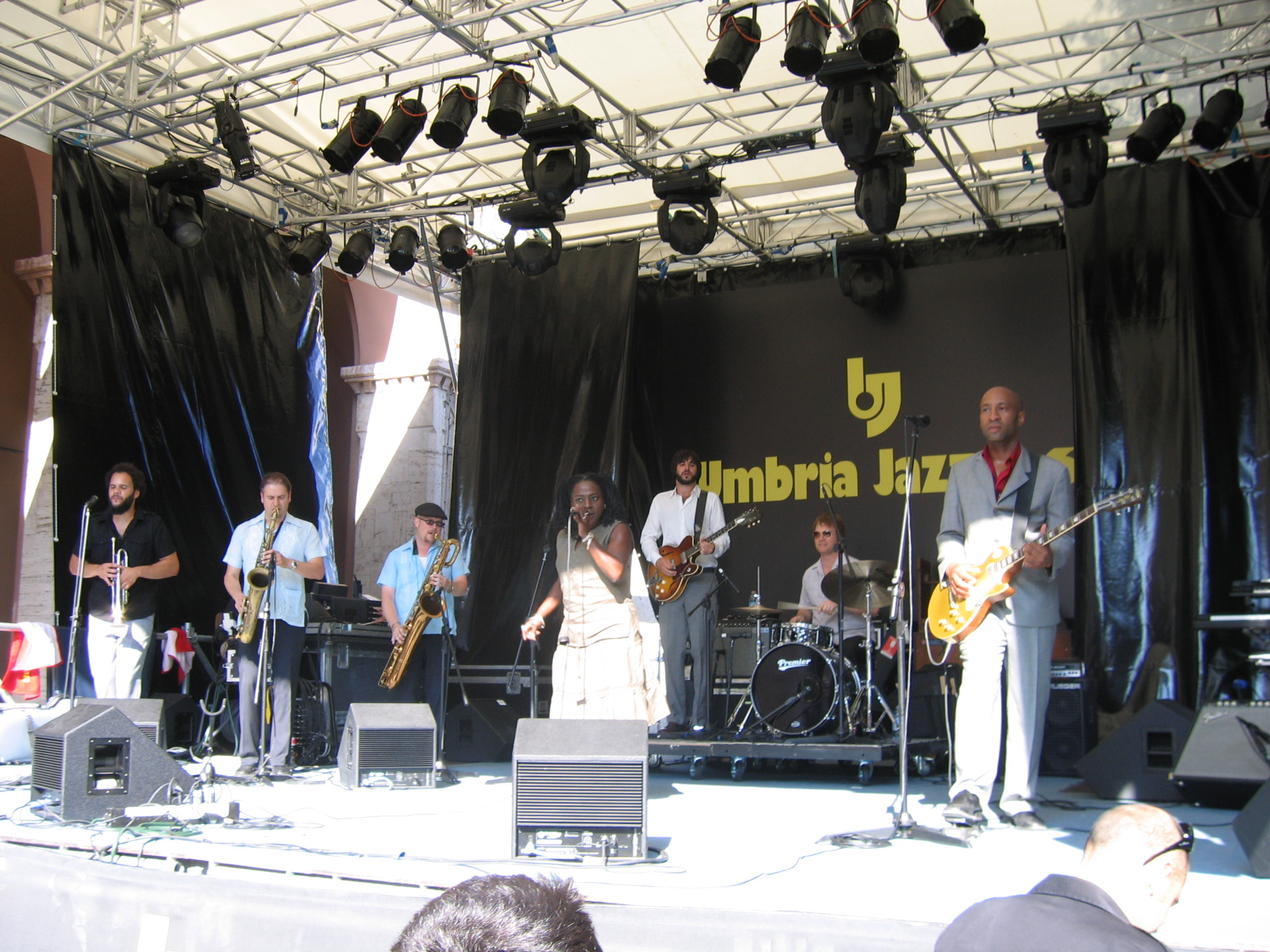
Sharon Jones & the Dap-Kings (2006)

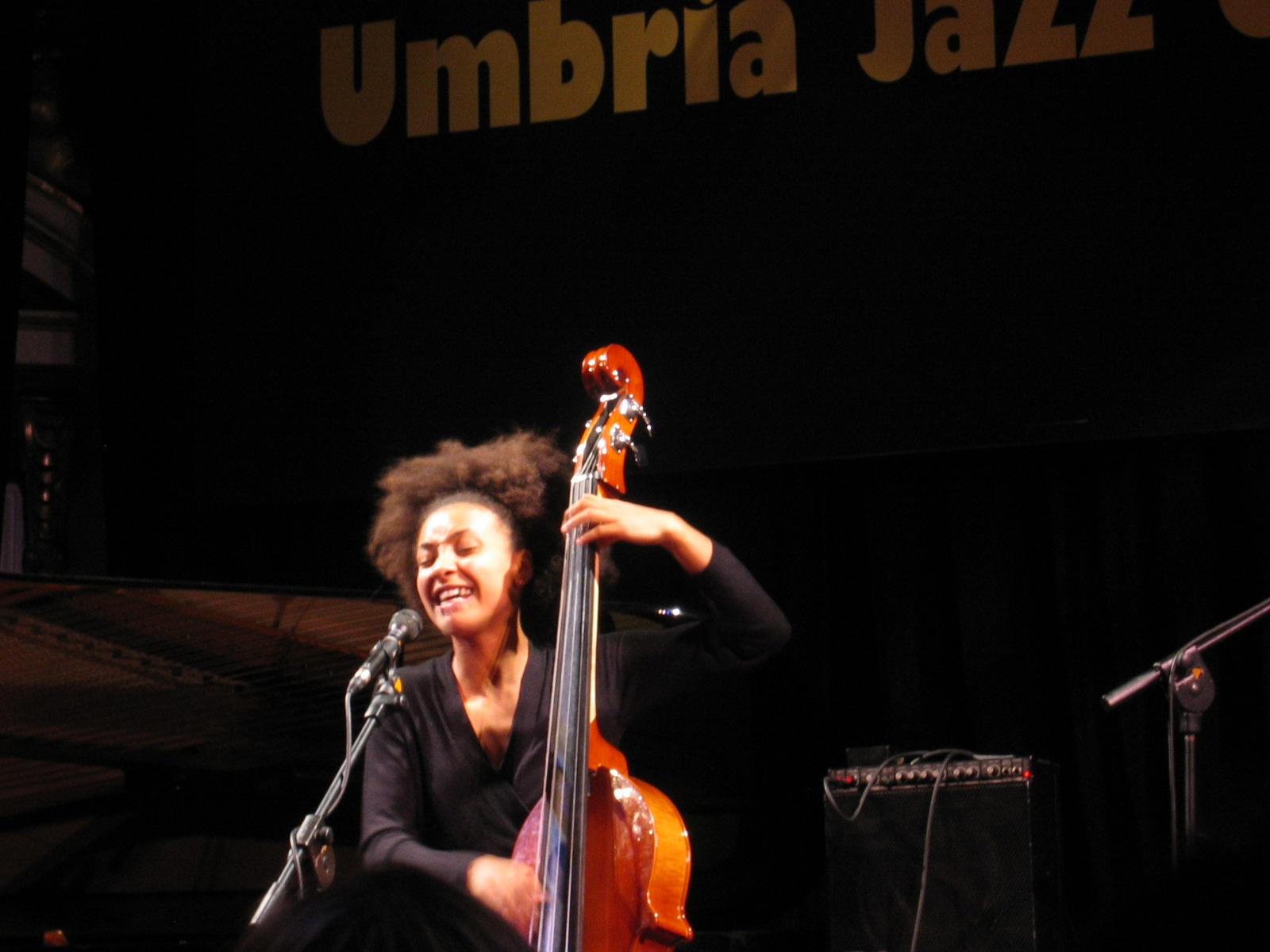
Esperanza Spalding (2007)

Listed in alphabetical order, are some of the best known artists who have taken part in Umbria Jazz since its inception, together with the dates when the artists appeared (in brackets).

- B.B. King (1982, 1993, 2004, 2009)
- Burt Bacharach (2009, 2015,2016)
- Chet Baker (1976)
- Gato Barbieri (2001)
- Kenny Barron (1990)
- Tony Bennett (1996, 1998, 2007, 2015)
- The Chainsmokers (2018)
- George Benson (2007, 2009)
- Carla Bley (1996, 2002)
- Stefano Bollani (2000, 2001, 2002, 2003, 2008, 2009, 2012, 2013, 2018, 2021, 2023)
- Dee Dee Bridgewater (2004)
- James Brown (2003, 2006)
- Gary Burton (1999, 2000, 2002, 2006)
- Terje Rypdal (1995)
- Francesco Cafiso (2005, 2009)
- Vinicio Capossela (2001)
- Dario Chiazzolino (2006)
- Eric Clapton (2006)
- Natalie Cole (2000)
- George Coleman (1976)
- Ornette Coleman (1998, 2000, 2003, 2007)
- Phil Collins (1996)
- Chick Corea (2002, 2006, 2009)
- Miles Davis (1985)
- Earth, Wind & Fire (2003)
- Bill Evans (1978)
- Gil Evans (1987)
- Lady Gaga (2015)
- Richard Galliano (1996, 1999, 2000, 2007)
- Stan Getz (1990)
- Gilberto Gil (1998, 2003)
- João Gilberto (1996, 2003)
- Dizzy Gillespie (1976)
- Charlie Haden (2002)
- Herbie Hancock (1994, 1996, 2002, 2008)
- Roy Hargrove (2000)
- Jim Hall (1996, 2005)
- John Lewis (2000)
- Milt Jackson (1995)
- Ahmad Jamal (1995, 2009)
- Al Jarreau (1996, 2007)
- Keith Jarrett (1974, 1996, 1999, 2000, 2007)
- Elton John (2005)
- Alicia Keys (2008)
- Miriam Makeba (2002)
- The Manhattan Transfer (1987, 2004)
- Wynton Marsalis (1999, 2009)
- Carmen McRae (1990)
- Bobby McFerrin (1988)
- Brad Mehldau (1999, 2005, 2006)
- Pat Metheny (1999, 2002, 2007)
- Charles Mingus (1974)
- Gabriele Mirabassi (2008)
- Van Morrison (2003)
- Gerry Mulligan (1974, 1988)
- Oscar Peterson (2007)
- Michel Petrucciani (1991, 1995, 1996)
- Enrico Pieranunzi (2000, 2009)
- Enzo Pietropaoli (2002)
- Enrico Rava (1999, 2000, 2001)
- Sonny Rollins (1996, 1998, 2005, 2008, 2012)
- Patti Russo (2007)
- Carlos Santana (1988, 2006)
- Renato Sellani (2005, 2009)
- Horace Silver (1976)
- Simply Red (2009)
- Wayne Shorter (2002, 2006)
- Sting (1987)
- Sun Ra and his Interstellar Galactic Arkestra (1973)
- Cecil Taylor (1975, 2009)
- James Taylor (1999, 2009)
- Sarah Vaughan (1984)
- Stevie Ray Vaughan (1985)
- Caetano Veloso (1995, 2003)
- Cedar Walton (1976)
- Weather Report (1973)
- Prince (2011)
- Joe Zawinul (1991)
